= Halifax Town Clock =

Landmark in Halifax, Nova Scotia

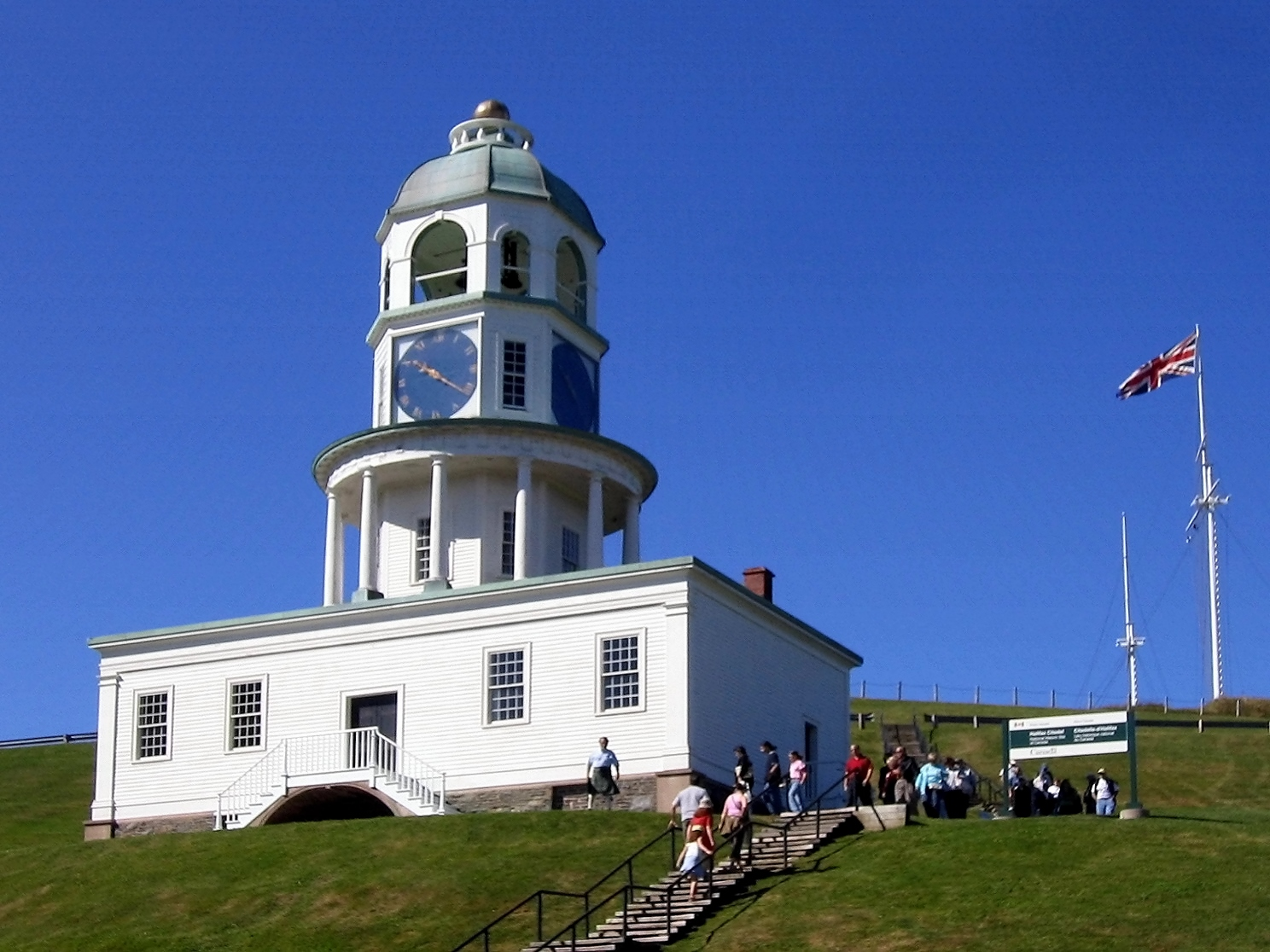
- Front of the town clock
- Alternative names: Old Town Clock

General information
- Type: Clock tower
- Architectural style: Palladian; Georgian
- Classification: Classified Federal Heritage Building (designated 8 April 2004)
- Location: Brunswick Street, Halifax, Nova Scotia, Canada
- Coordinates: 44°38′50″N 63°34′39″W
- Completed: October 1803
- Renovated: 1960–1962
- Owner: Parks Canada

The Halifax Town Clock, sometimes called the Old Town Clock, is a historic clock tower located at Citadel Hill in the urban core of Halifax, the capital city of Nova Scotia. Built in October 1803 under the direction of Prince Edward, Duke of Kent, the clock has been in operation since 20 October 1803, stopping once during the Halifax Explosion. The Halifax Town Clock underwent significant restoration work in the 1960s.

The mechanism of the clock was built by Benjamin Vulliamy, who also built the Regulator Clock at the King's Observatory in London. Its three iron bells were cast at the Whitechapel Bell Foundry, which also produced the Liberty Bell.

== History ==
Prince Edward, Duke of Kent, the commander-in-chief of the military forces of British North America, is credited with the idea of a clock for the British Army and Royal Navy garrison at Halifax, to resolve tardiness in the garrison. Prince Edward had a passion for punctuality, and was particularly fond of mechanical toys – especially ones which played music or rang chimes, such as music boxes, toy organs, mechanical singing birds, and clocks and watches of a wide variety. It was this intersection of interests that brought a clock tower to Halifax. Prince Edward was in Halifax in 1800 and directed the Royal Engineers to prepare the plans, although it wasn't completed until long after he returned to England. Designed by Captain William Fenwick, the clock tower was initially planned to be built elsewhere on the Citadel until the intervention of Sir John Wentworth, the Lieutenant Governor of Nova Scotia, under whose direction it was erected on the eastern slope facing Brunswick Street. This location was chosen so the clock tower could also be viewed by the citizens of Halifax rather than only the military.

The Halifax Town Clock was built in 1803, and has been in operation since 20 October 1803. The clock tower include a residence on the first floor for a caretaker and his family, usually a retired soldier or police officer. The caretaker for many years was William "Gunner" White, a veteran of the Royal Artillery who later joined the Halifax Police Force. White raised his family in the clock tower, including his son Joseph White who became a First World War flying ace. The clock was damaged by the Halifax Explosion in 1917. William White fixed the clock but the chimes were not repaired until 1944.

From 1960 until 1962, the clock tower underwent significant restoration work, and in 1966 it received a new glass face. In the early 1990s, the faces of the clock were painted blue, their original colour, and the exterior facade was restored to its original Georgian style. Additional restoration work was carried out in 2005 to restore the faces of the clock, followed by new copper roofing and restoration of the clock faces and hands in 2018.

== Architecture ==
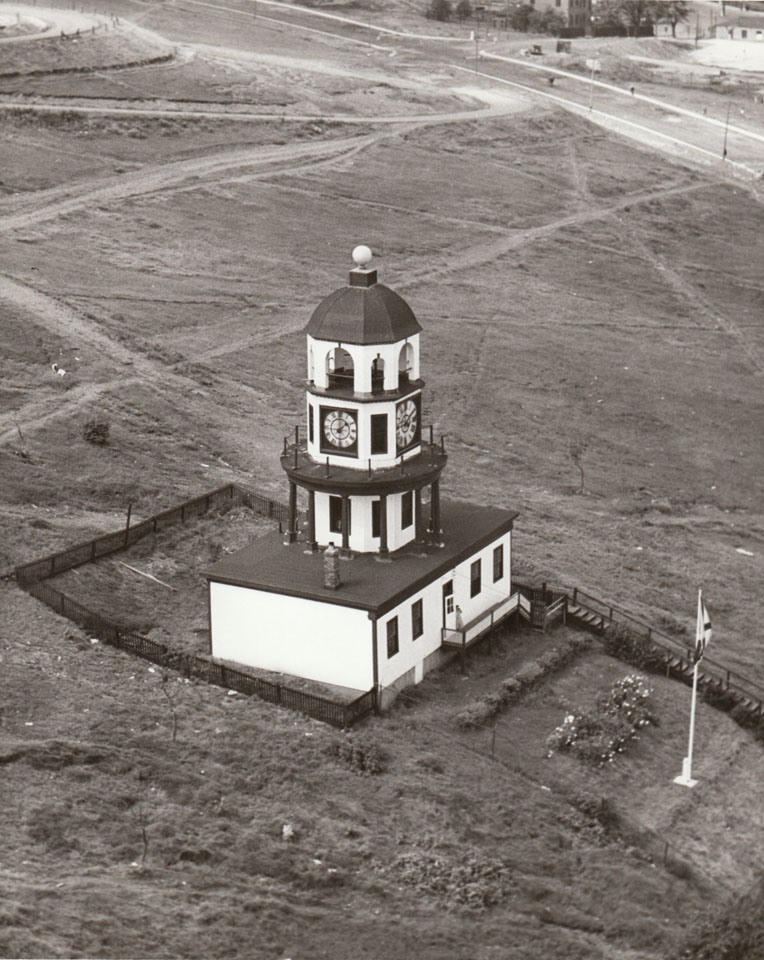
The clock tower is a three-tiered irregular octagon (1948 photo)

The Halifax Town Clock is a three-tiered irregular octagon tower built atop a one-storey white clapboard building of classic Palladian proportions. The clock tower is approximately 46 feet tall from the bottom of the colonnade to the top of the cupola, making the total structure about 60 feet tall. The building below the clock tower measures 30 feet in length along the north and south faces, and 51 feet along the east and west faces. The building is about 39 feet tall, providing roughly 1,500 square feet of living space for use by a caretaker.

The architect for the structure which houses the clock may be William Hughes, who was a master builder at His Majesty's Dockyard in Halifax. According to the historian Alan Gowans, the design was quite typical for the period, and the architect was not recorded.

== Mechanism ==
The clock mechanism was created in London by the King's Clockmaker to George III, Benjamin Vulliamy, for a total cost of £339. Vulliamy was a respected clockmaker who previously built the Regulator Clock at the King's Observatory in London. The mechanism, serial number 371, weighs about 1,000 pounds and is driven by three 125-pound weights, one for each strike. The weights and the clock's 12-foot pendulum are suspended in a 45-foot deep shaft. The mechanism is housed in a heavy wrought iron frame located immediately below the belfry. The clock mechanism arrived in Halifax aboard HMS Dart on 10 June 1803, and was installed on 20 October of the same year.

The three iron bells of the mechanism were cast in London in 1801 at the Whitechapel Bell Foundry, which also produced famous bells such as the Liberty Bell and the bell for Big Ben.

== Cultural depictions ==
The Halifax Town Clock is an important landmark in the city of Halifax. The Honourable Joseph Howe wrote a lengthy poem about the Halifax Town Clock in 1836, titled To the Town Clock. It was further honoured by William C. Borrett in his series of books titled Tales Told Under the Old Town Clock.

The clock was depicted as a character named Chimey in the children's television show Theodore Tugboat. In 2014, the Halifax Town Clock was depicted on the cover of an issue no. 1 The Amazing Spider-Man comic book, released a week prior to the debut of The Amazing Spider-Man 2 movie.

== See also ==
- List of historic places in Halifax, Nova Scotia
- List of oldest buildings and structures in Halifax, Nova Scotia
- History of Halifax, Nova Scotia
- Montreal Clock Tower – a clock tower in Montreal, Quebec
- Soldiers' Tower – a bell and clock tower in Toronto, Ontario
