= Joseph Leonard Maries White =

Canadian First World War flying ace

- Born: 6 January 1897; Halifax, Nova Scotia
- Died: 24 February 1925 (aged 28); Camp Borden, Ontario
- Relatives: W. J. White (father)
- Military career
- Allegiance: George V
- Branch: Canadian Militia, Canadian Army (1915-1917), Royal Flying Corps (1917-1918), Royal Air Force (1918), Royal Canadian Air Force (1924-1925)
- Rank: Captain (RFC, RAF), Flight Lieutenant (RCAF)
- Nickname: Joe
- Unit: No. 65 Squadron RAF
- Awards: Medal for Military Valour, Croix de Guerre, Distinguished Flying Cross (DFC)

Joseph Leonard Maries White DFC, (6 January 1897 – 24 February 1925) was a Canadian First World War flying ace, officially credited with 22 victories.

White was killed in a crash following a mid-air collision with another aircraft at Camp Borden, Ontario, on 24 February 1925.

== Early life ==
Born in Halifax, White grew up in the Old Town Clock on Halifax's Citadel Hill. His father, William “Gunner” White, served in the Royal Artillery before joining the Halifax police and later becoming caretaker of the Old Town Clock where he resided with his family.

== Military Service ==
According to his attestation paper, White served in the Canadian Militia prior to the war, and was trained as a surveyor. He studied at Dalhousie University and joined the Canadian Machine Gun Corps when he was 18 years old. Injured in battle, he transferred to the Royal Flying Corps. He shot down at least 22 aircraft and was honoured for his “bravery and dash in action” with several awards for gallantry. White retired as a Captain in No. 65 Squadron at the end of the war. In peacetime, he was a pioneering member of the newly-formed Royal Canadian Air Force but died in a mid-air collision in 1925.

== Text of citations ==
=== Distinguished Flying Cross ===
"Lt. Joseph Leonard Maries White (late Canadian Machine Gun Corps). This officer is distinguished for his bravery and dash in action, never hesitating to attack, regardless of the enemy's numerical superiority. He has destroyed three enemy aircraft and driven down two out of control. In addition he has carried out most valuable reconnaissance service at low altitudes."

=== Distinguished Flying Cross – Bar ===
"Lt. (T./Capt.) Joseph Leonard Maries White, D.F.C. (Can. M.G.C.). In company with another pilot this officer recently attacked a hostile formation of fourteen scouts. One of these he shot down in flames, and a second out of control. Captain White not only displays courage and skill of a high order in attacking machines in the air and troops on the ground, but he has rendered excellent service on reconnaissance duty, obtaining most valuable information."
