= Nova Scotia =

Province of Canada

Nova Scotia Nouvelle-Écosse (French)
- Province
- Flag Coat of arms
- Motto(s): Munit Hæc et Altera Vincit (Latin) "One defends and the other conquers"
- Coordinates: 45°N 63°W
- Country: Canada
- Before confederation: Province of Nova Scotia
- Confederation: 1 July 1867 (1st, with New Brunswick, Ontario, Quebec)
- Capital (and largest city): Halifax
- Largest metro: Halifax Regional Municipality (HRM)

Government
  - Type: Parliamentary constitutional monarchy
  - Lieutenant Governor: Mike Savage
  - Premier: Tim Houston
- Legislature: Nova Scotia House of Assembly
- Federal representation: Parliament of Canada
- House seats: 11 of 343 (3.2%)
- Senate seats: 10 of 105 (9.5%)

Area
  - Total: 55,284 km^{2} (21,345 sq mi)
  - Land: 52,942 km^{2} (20,441 sq mi)
  - Water: 2,342 km^{2} (904 sq mi) 4.2%
  - Rank: 12th
- 0.6% of Canada

Population (2021)
  - Total: 969,383
  - Estimate (Q3 2026): ▲1,103,419
  - Rank: 7th
  - Density: 18.31/km^{2} (47.4/sq mi)
- Demonym(s): Nova Scotian, Bluenoser
- Official languages: English (de facto)

GDP
  - Rank: 7th
  - Total (2020): CA$46.849 billion
  - Per capita: CA$52,390 (12th)

HDI
  - HDI (2023): 0.919—Very high (9th)
- Time zone: UTC-04:00 (AST)
  - Summer (DST): UTC-03:00 (ADT)
- Canadian postal abbr.: NS
- Postal code prefix: B
- ISO 3166 code: CA-NS
- Flower: Mayflower
- Tree: Red spruce
- Bird: Osprey
- Website: novascotia.ca
- Rankings include all provinces and territories

Nova Scotia (Note: /ˌnoʊvə ˈskoʊʃə/ French: Nouvelle-Écosse [nuvɛl ekɔs]) is a province in The Maritimes region of Canada, located on the nation's east coast. With an estimated population of over 1 million as of 2026, Nova Scotia is the most populous province in Atlantic Canada. Nova Scotia is also the second-most densely populated province in Canada, and the second-smallest province by area. The province comprises the Nova Scotia peninsula and Cape Breton Island, as well as 3,800 other coastal islands. The province is connected to the rest of Canada by the Isthmus of Chignecto, on which the province's sole land border, with New Brunswick, is located.

Nova Scotia's provincial capital and largest city is Halifax, which is home to over 45% of the province's population as of the 2021 census. Halifax is the twelfth-largest census metropolitan area (CMA) in Canada, the largest municipality in Atlantic Canada, and Canada's second-largest coastal municipality after Vancouver.

The land that makes up what is now Nova Scotia was inhabited by the Mi'kmaq people at the time of European colonization. In 1605, Acadia—France's first New France colony—was founded with the creation of Acadia's capital, Port Royal. The Scots, English, then British, fought France for the territory on numerous occasions for over a century afterwards, having gained it from them in the 1713 Peace of Utrecht, which ended the War of the Spanish Succession. Port Royal was renamed Annapolis Royal and the settlement served as the capital of Nova Scotia until the founding of Halifax in 1749.

In subsequent years, the British began settling "foreign Protestants" in the region and deported the French-speaking Acadians en masse. There was ambivalence in Nova Scotia over whether the colony should join the Americans in the war against Britain. During the American Revolutionary War (1775–1783), thousands of Loyalists settled in Nova Scotia.

In 1848, Nova Scotia became the first British colony to achieve responsible government. In July 1867, Nova Scotia joined in Confederation with New Brunswick and the Province of Canada (now Ontario and Quebec), forming Canada.

== Etymology ==
Nova Scotia is Latin for 'New Scotland' and is the recognized Canadian English name for the province. Just prior to receiving this name, it was referred to as Nova Francia. Nova Scotia also appears on some older maps as New Caledonia. In both Canadian French and Canadian Gaelic, the province is directly translated as 'New Scotland' (French: Nouvelle-Écosse; Gaelic: Alba Nuadh). In general, Romance and Slavic languages use translations of 'New Scotland' to their language, while most other languages use transliterations of the Anglo-Latin name, including the native language Mi'kmaq (No'pa Sko'sia).

The province was first named in the 1621 Royal Charter granting to Sir William Alexander the right to settle lands as a Scottish colony, including modern Nova Scotia, Cape Breton Island, Prince Edward Island, New Brunswick and the Gaspé Peninsula.

== History ==
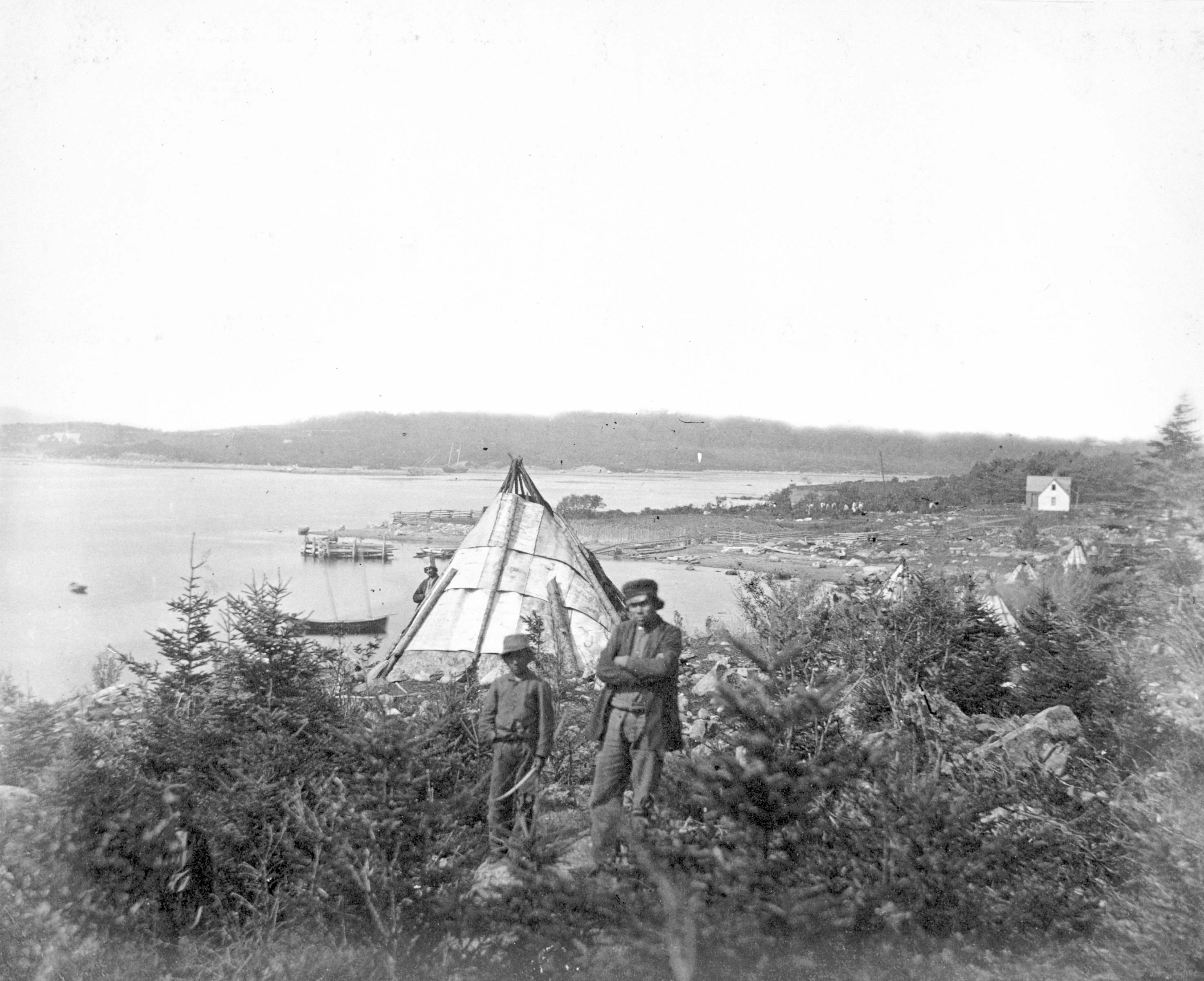
Mi'kmaq family in Tuft's Cove, 1871. The Mi'kmaq inhabited Nova Scotia when the first Europeans arrived.

Nova Scotia includes regions of the Mi'kmaq nation of Mi'kma'ki (mi'gama'gi), the territory of which extends across the Maritimes, parts of Maine, Newfoundland and the Gaspé Peninsula. The Mi'kmaq people are part of the large Algonquian-language family and inhabited Nova Scotia at the time the first European colonists arrived. Research published in 1871 as well as Silas Tertius Rand's work from 1894 showed that some Mi'kmaq believed they had emigrated from the west, and then lived alongside the Kwēdĕchk, the original inhabitants. According to these accounts, the two tribes engaged in a war that lasted "many years", and involved the "slaughter of men, women, and children, and torture of captives", and the eventual displacement of the Kwēdĕchk by the victorious Mi’kmaq.

=== European settlement ===
The first Europeans to settle the area were the French, who sailed into the Annapolis Basin in 1604, but chose to settle at Saint Croix Island in Maine instead. They abandoned the Maine settlement the following year and, in 1605, established a settlement at Port Royal, which grew into modern-day Annapolis Royal. This would be the first permanent European settlement in what would later become Canada. The settlement was in the Mi'kmaw district of Kespukwitk and was the founding settlement of what would become Acadia.

In 1621, King James VI of Scotland granted a charter to allow a Scottish colony to be founded in North America. The charter which was granted by the King covered the area of the Maritime Provinces and the Gaspé peninsula, whilst the French had claimed territory in Acadia. The charter granted Sir William Alexander, a Scottish noble, powers to establish a system of government, full rights over fishing and minerals and the power to execute law in the new colony. A Scottish colony was eventually established in 1629 following the arrival of around seventy Scots to settle in the area known as "New Scotland".

"New Scotland" was captured by the French in 1632, with the Scots who had colonised the area forced to return to Scotland after the French occupation. Following a prolonged period of conflict between the Scots, French and English, Nova Scotia ultimately fell to British rule. As a result, many Scots grasped the opportunity to once again settle in Nova Scotia.

Warfare was common in Nova Scotia during the 17th and 18th centuries. During the first 80 years the French and Acadians lived in Nova Scotia, nine significant military clashes took place as the English, Dutch, French and Mi'kmaq fought for possession of the area. These encounters happened at Port Royal, Saint John, (Note: Until 1784, New Brunswick administratively formed part of Nova Scotia.) Cap de Sable (present-day Pubnico to Port La Tour, Nova Scotia), Jemseg (1674 and 1758) and Baleine (1629). The Acadian Civil War took place from 1640 to 1645. Beginning with King William's War in 1688, a series of six wars took place between the English and the French, with Nova Scotia being a consistent theatre of conflict between the two powers.

==== 18th century ====
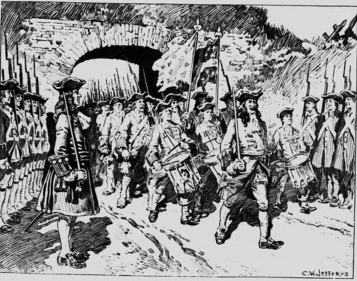
French forces withdrawing from Port-Royal after being defeated by the British in 1710

Hostilities between France and England, (from 1707, France and the Kingdom of Great Britain after the Acts of Union), in North America resumed from 1702 to 1713, known as Queen Anne's War. The siege of Port Royal took place in 1710, ending French rule in peninsular Acadia. The subsequent signing of the Treaty of Utrecht in 1713 formally recognized British rule in the region, while returning Cape Breton Island (Île Royale) and Prince Edward Island (Île Saint-Jean) to the French. Despite the British conquest of Acadia in 1710, Nova Scotia remained primarily occupied by Catholic Acadians and Mi'kmaq, who confined British forces to Annapolis and to Canso. Present-day New Brunswick formed a part of the French colony of Acadia. Immediately after the capture of Port Royal in 1710, Francis Nicholson announced it would be renamed Annapolis Royal in honour of Queen Anne.

As a result of Father Rale's War (1722–1725), the Mi'kmaq signed a series of treaties with the British in 1725. The Mi'kmaq signed a treaty of submission to the British crown. However, conflict between the Acadians, Mi'kmaq, French and the British persisted in the following decades with King George's War (1744–1748).

Father Le Loutre's War (1749–1755) began when Edward Cornwallis arrived to establish Halifax with 13 transports on 21 June 1749. A General Court, made up of the governor and the council, was the highest court in the colony at the time. Jonathan Belcher was sworn in as chief justice of the Nova Scotia Supreme Court on 21 October 1754. The first legislative assembly in Halifax, under the Governorship of Charles Lawrence, met on 2 October 1758.

During the French and Indian War of 1754–1763 (the North American theatre of the Seven Years' War), the British deported the Acadians and recruited New England Planters to resettle the colony. The 75-year period of war ended with the Halifax Treaties between the British and the Mi'kmaq (1761). After the war, some Acadians were allowed to return.

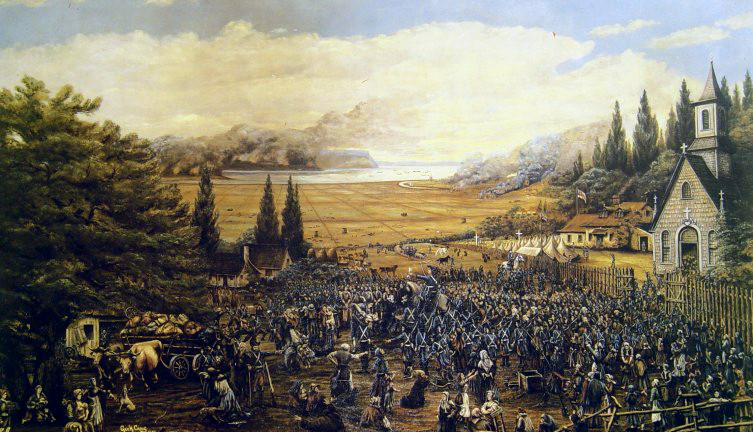
Expulsion of the Acadians in Grand-Pré. More than 80 per cent of the Acadian population was expelled from the region between 1755 and 1764.

In 1763, most of Acadia (Cape Breton Island, St. John's Island (now Prince Edward Island), and New Brunswick) became part of Nova Scotia. In 1765, the county of Sunbury was created. This included the territory of present-day New Brunswick and eastern Maine as far as the Penobscot River. In 1769, St. John's Island became a separate colony.

The American Revolution (1775–1783) had a significant impact on shaping Nova Scotia, with the colony initially displaying ambivalence over whether the colony should join the revolution; Rebellion flared at the Battle of Fort Cumberland (1776) and at the Siege of Saint John (1777). Throughout the war, American privateers devastated the maritime economy by capturing ships and looting almost every community outside of Halifax. These American raids alienated many sympathetic or neutral Nova Scotians into supporting the British.

By the end of the war, Nova Scotia had outfitted numerous privateers to attack American shipping. British military forces based at Halifax succeeded in preventing an American occupation of Nova Scotia, though the Royal Navy failed to establish naval supremacy in the region. While the British captured many American privateers in battles such as the Naval battle off Halifax (1782), many more continued attacks on shipping and settlements until the final months of the war. The Royal Navy struggled to maintain British supply lines, defending British convoys from American and French attacks as in the fiercely fought convoy battle, the Naval battle off Cape Breton (1781).

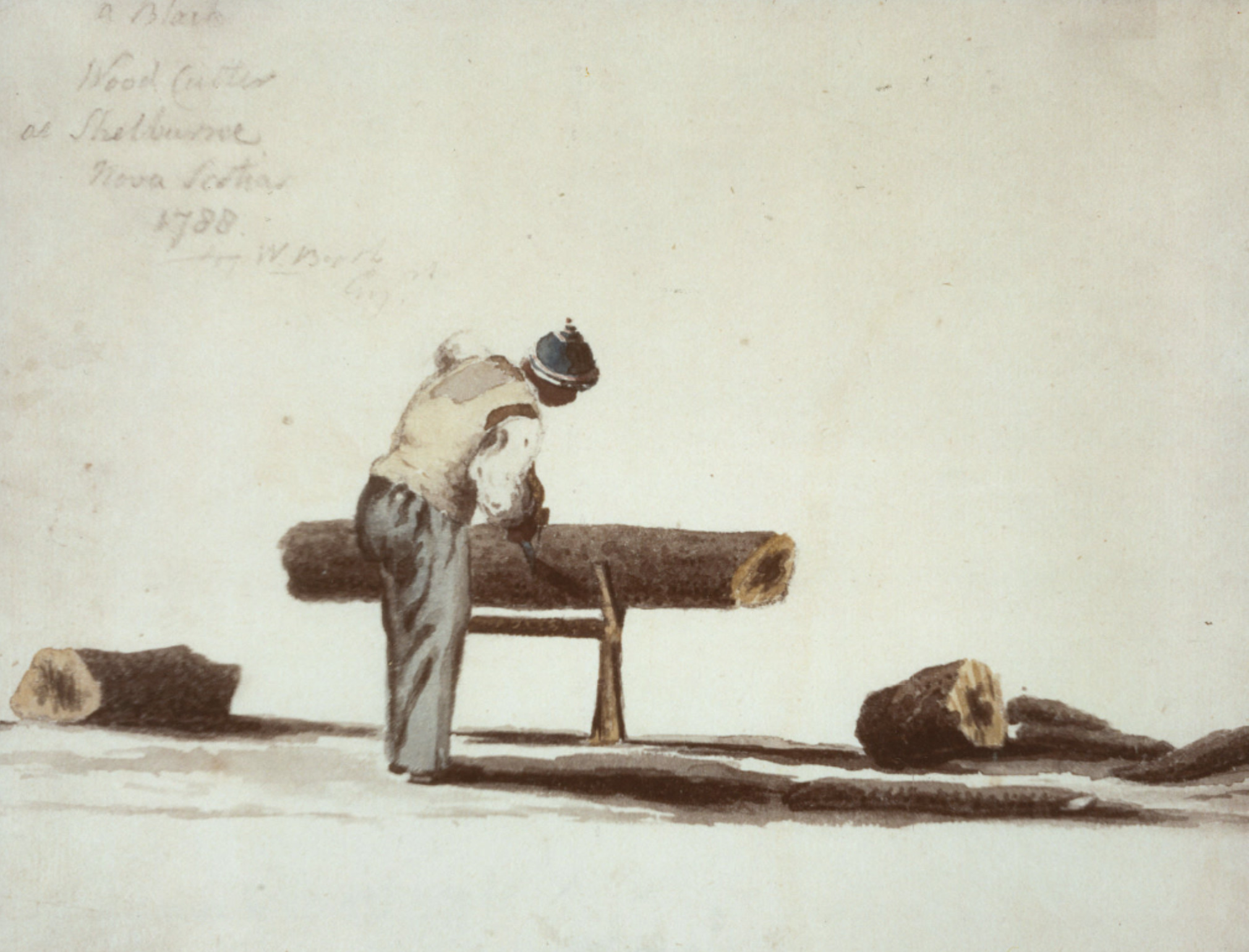
1788 illustration of a Black woodcutter in Shelburne, Nova Scotia

After the Americans and their French allies won at the siege of Yorktown in 1781, approximately 33,000 Loyalists, the King's Loyal Americans, allowed to place "United Empire Loyalist" after their names, settled in Nova Scotia, 14,000 of them in what became New Brunswick, on lands granted by the Crown as some compensation for their losses. The British administration divided Nova Scotia and hived off Cape Breton and New Brunswick in 1784. The Loyalist exodus created new communities across Nova Scotia, including Shelburne, which briefly became one of the larger British settlements in North America, and infused Nova Scotia with additional capital and skills.

The migration caused political tensions between Loyalist leaders and the leaders of the existing New England Planters settlement. The Loyalist influx also pushed Nova Scotia's 2000 Mi'kmaq People to the margins as Loyalist land grants encroached on ill-defined native lands. As part of the Loyalist migration, about 3,000 Black Loyalists arrived; they founded the largest free Black settlement in North America at Birchtown, near Shelburne. There are several Black Loyalists buried in unmarked graves in the Old Burying Ground in Halifax. Many Nova Scotian communities were settled by British regiments that fought in the war.

In 1786, during the tenure of Lt. Gen. John Parr as governor, the Colony of Nova Scotia transitioned to being the Province of Nova Scotia, with the populace gaining a higher degree of autonomy and self-governance.

==== 19th century ====
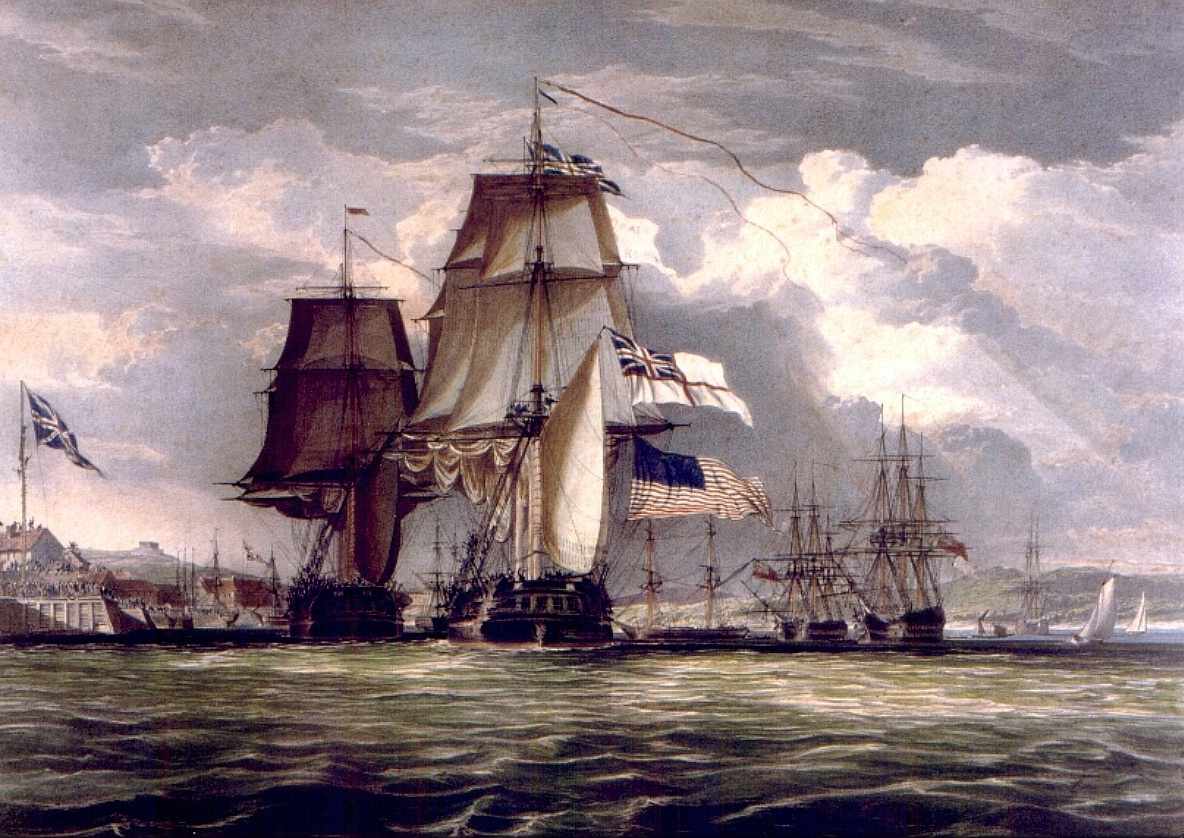
HMS Shannon leading the captured USS Chesapeake into Halifax during the War of 1812

During the War of 1812, Nova Scotia's contribution to the British war effort involved communities either purchasing or building various privateer ships to attack U.S. vessels. Perhaps the most dramatic moment in the war for Nova Scotia occurred when HMS Shannon escorted the captured American frigate USS Chesapeake into Halifax Harbour in 1813. Many of the U.S. prisoners were kept at Deadman's Island.

Nova Scotia became the first colony in British North America and in the British Empire to achieve responsible government in January–February 1848 and become self-governing through the efforts of Joseph Howe. Nova Scotia had established representative government in 1758, an achievement later commemorated by the erection of Dingle Tower in 1908.

Nova Scotians fought in the Crimean War of 1853–1856. The 1860 Welsford-Parker Monument in Halifax is the second-oldest war monument in Canada and the only Crimean War monument in North America. It commemorates the 1854–55 Siege of Sevastopol.

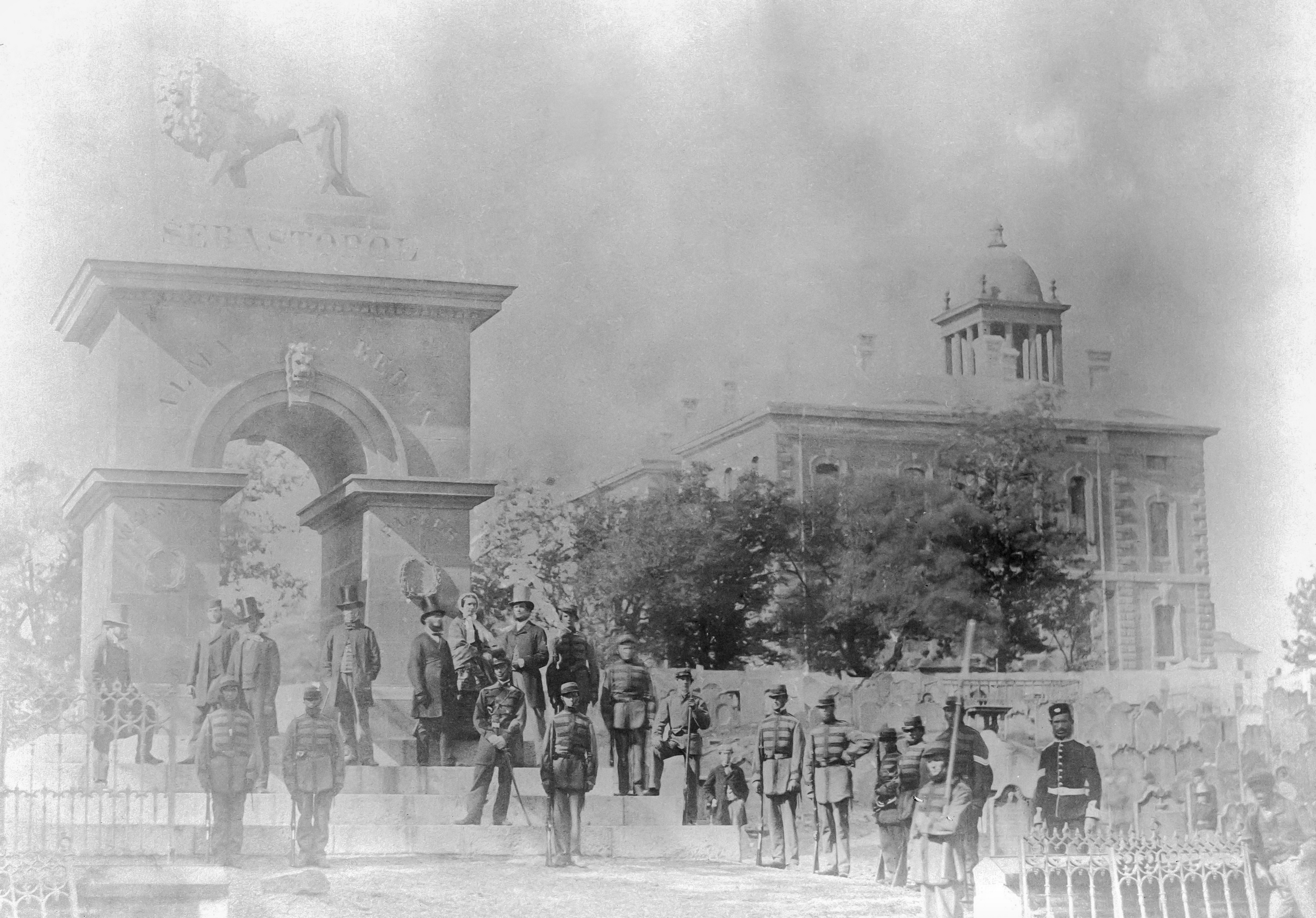
The inauguration of the Sebastopol Monument in 1860. The monument was built to honour Nova Scotians who fought in the Crimean War.

Thousands of Nova Scotians fought in the American Civil War (1861–1865), primarily on behalf of the North. The British Empire (including Nova Scotia) declared itself neutral in the conflict. As a result, Britain (and Nova Scotia) continued to trade with both the South and the North. Nova Scotia's economy boomed during the Civil War.

=== Post-Confederation history ===
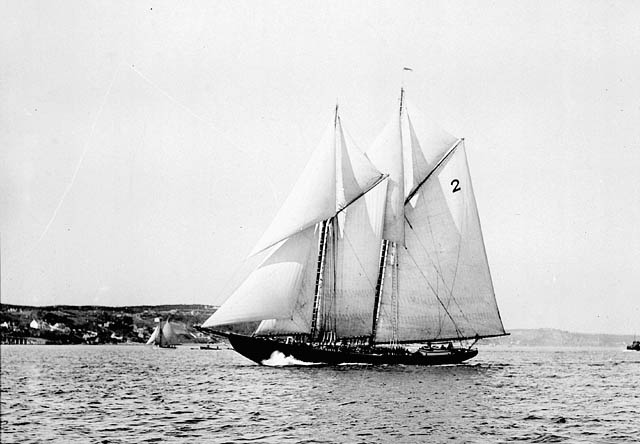
The Bluenose in 1921. The racing ship became a provincial icon for Nova Scotia in the 1920s and 1930s.

Soon after the American Civil War, Pro-Canadian Confederation premier Charles Tupper led Nova Scotia into Canadian Confederation on 1 July 1867, along with New Brunswick and the Province of Canada. The Anti-Confederation Party was led by Joseph Howe. Almost three months later, in the election of 18 September 1867, the Anti-Confederation Party won 18 out of 19 federal seats, and 36 out of 38 seats in the provincial legislature.

Throughout the 19th century, numerous businesses developed in Nova Scotia became of pan-Canadian and international importance: the Starr Manufacturing Company (first ice skate manufacturer in Canada), the Bank of Nova Scotia, Cunard Line, Alexander Keith's Brewery, Morse's Tea Company (first tea company in Canada), among others.

Nova Scotia became a world leader in both building and owning wooden sailing ships in the second half of the 19th century. Nova Scotia produced internationally recognized shipbuilders Donald McKay and William Dawson Lawrence. The fame Nova Scotia achieved from sailors was assured in 1895 when Joshua Slocum became the first man to sail single-handedly around the world. International attention continued into the following century with the many racing victories of the Bluenose schooner. Nova Scotia was also the birthplace and home of Samuel Cunard, a British shipping magnate (born at Halifax, Nova Scotia) who founded the Cunard Line.

In December 1917, at least 1,782 people were killed in the Halifax Explosion, which was the largest human-made explosion at the time.

In April 2004, the Nova Scotia legislature adopted a resolution explicitly inviting the government of the Turks and Caicos Islands to explore the possibility of joining Canada as part of that Province.

In April 2020, a man committed a killing spree across the province that became the deadliest shooting spree in Canada's history.

== Geography ==
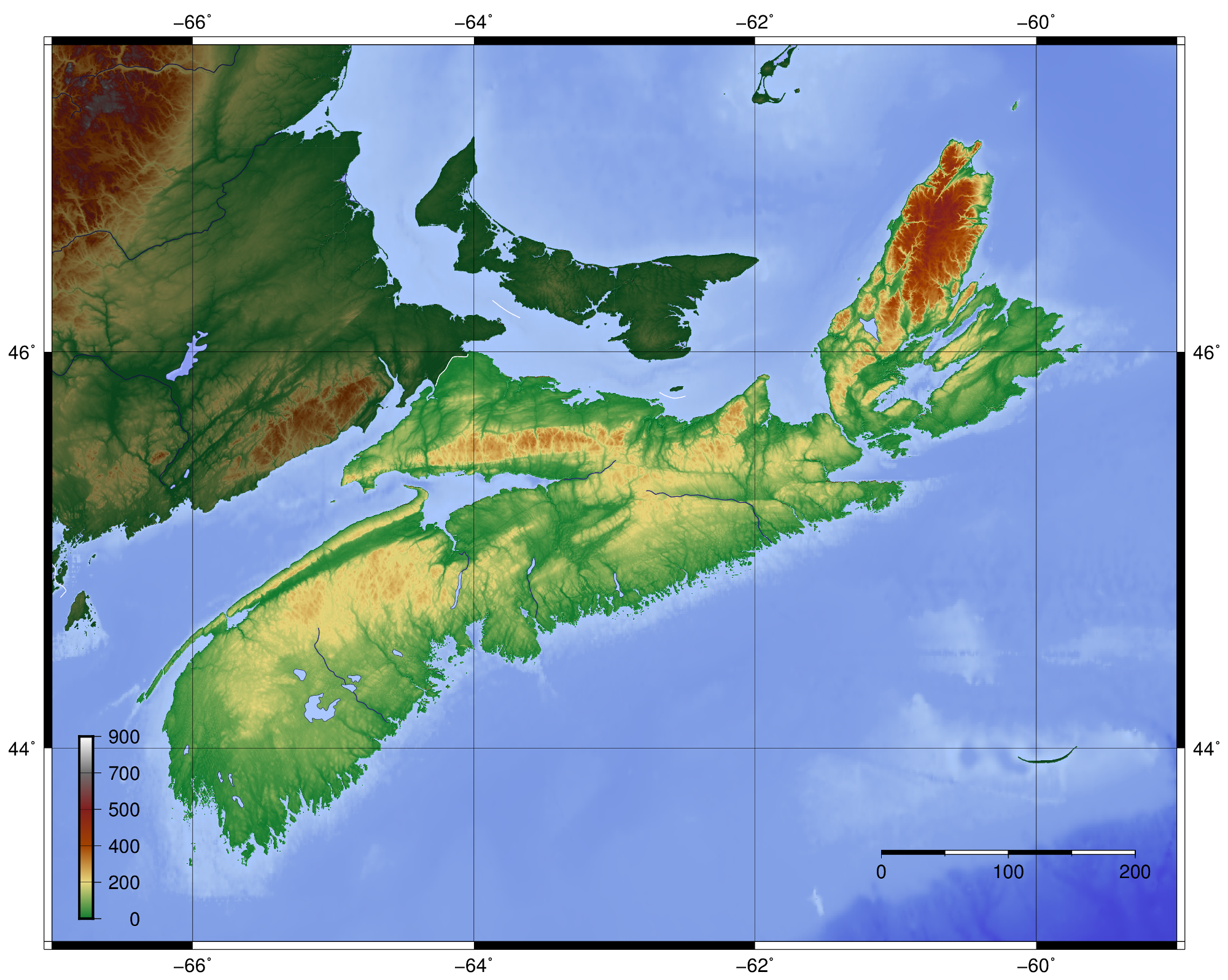
A topographic map of Nova Scotia

Nova Scotia is Canada's second-smallest province in area, after Prince Edward Island. It is surrounded by four major bodies of water: the Gulf of Saint Lawrence to the north, the Bay of Fundy to the west, the Gulf of Maine to the southwest, and the Atlantic Ocean to the east. The province's mainland is the Nova Scotia peninsula and includes numerous bays and estuaries. Nowhere in Nova Scotia is more than 67 km (42 mi) from the ocean. Cape Breton Island, a large island to the northeast of the Nova Scotia mainland, is also part of the province, as is Sable Island, a small island notorious for being the site of offshore shipwrecks, approximately 175 km (110 mi) from the province's southern coast.

Nova Scotia has many ancient fossil-bearing rock formations. These formations are particularly rich on the Bay of Fundy's shores. Blue Beach near Hantsport, Joggins Fossil Cliffs, on the Bay of Fundy's shores, has yielded an abundance of Carboniferous-age fossils. Wasson's Bluff, near the town of Parrsboro, has yielded both Triassic- and Jurassic-age fossils. The highest point is White Hill at 533 metres (1,749 ft) above sea level, situated amongst the Cape Breton Highlands in the far north of the province.

Nova Scotia is located along the 45th parallel north, so it is midway between the Equator and the North Pole. The province contains 5,400 lakes.

=== Climate ===
A Köppen climate map of Nova Scotia

Nova Scotia lies in the mid-temperate zone and, although the province is almost surrounded by water, the climate is closer to continental climate rather than maritime. The winter and summer temperature extremes of the continental climate are moderated by the ocean. Winters are cold enough to be classified as continental—still being nearer the freezing point than inland areas to the west.

The Nova Scotian climate is in many ways similar to the central Baltic Sea coast in Northern Europe, only wetter and snowier. This is true although Nova Scotia is some fifteen parallels further south. Areas not on the Atlantic coast experience warmer summers more typical of inland areas, and winter lows are a little colder. On 12 August 2020, the community of Grand Étang recorded an overnight low of 23.3 °C (73.9 °F).

Average daily maximum and minimum temperatures for selected locations in Nova Scotia
Location	July (°C)	July (°F)	January (°C)	January (°F)
Halifax	23/14	73/58	0/−8	32/17
Sydney	23/12	73/54	−1/−9	30/14
Kentville	25/14	78/57	−1/−10	29/14
Truro	24/13	75/55	−1/−12	29/9
Liverpool	25/14	77/57	0/–9	32/15
Shelburne	23/12	73/54	1/−8	33/17
Yarmouth	21/12	69/55	1/−7	33/19

== Demography ==
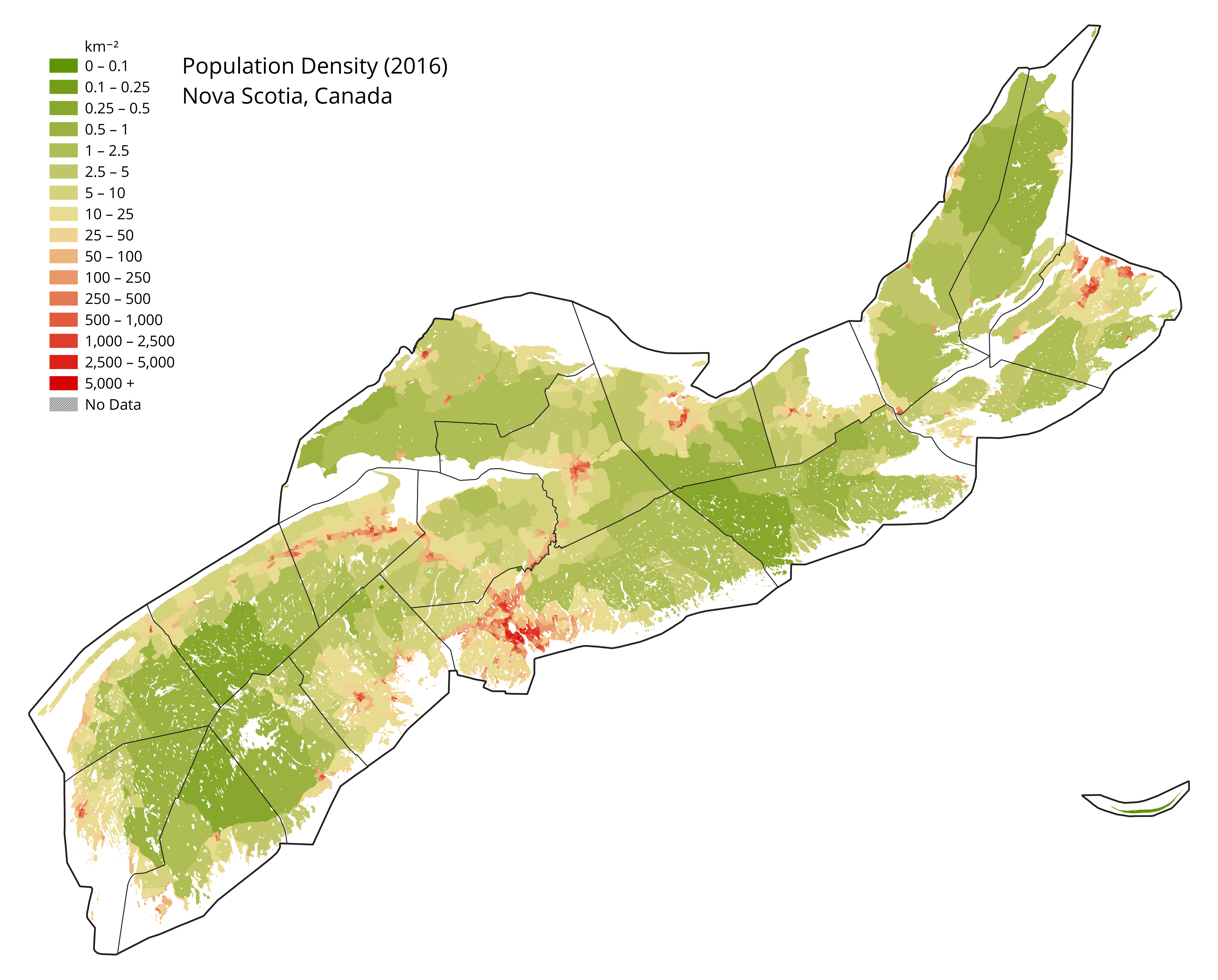
A 2016 population density map of Nova Scotia, with county and regional municipality borders shown.

=== Ethnicity ===
According to the 2016 Canadian census the largest ethnic group in Nova Scotia is Scottish (30.0%), followed by English (28.9%), Irish (21.6%), French (16.5%), German (10.7%), First Nations (5.4%), Dutch (3.5%), Métis (2.9%), and Acadian (2.6%). 42.6% of respondents identified their ethnicity as "Canadian".

=== Language ===
As of the 2021 Canadian Census, the ten most spoken languages in the province included English (951,945 or 99.59%), French (99,300 or 10.39%), Arabic (11,745 or 1.23%), Hindi (10,115 or 1.06%), Spanish (8,675 or 0.91%), Mandarin (8,525 or 0.89%), Punjabi (6,730 or 0.7%), German (6,665 or 0.7%), Miꞌkmaq (5,650 or 0.59%), and Tagalog (5,595 or 0.59%). The question on knowledge of languages allows for multiple responses.

The distribution of Scottish Gaelic in the Maritimes

Nova Scotia is home to the largest Scottish Gaelic-speaking community outside of Scotland, with a small number of native speakers in Pictou County and Antigonish County, and on Cape Breton Island, and the language is taught in a number of secondary schools throughout the province. In 2018 the government launched a new Gaelic vehicle licence plate to raise awareness of the language and help fund Gaelic language and culture initiatives. They estimated that there were 2,000 Gaelic speakers in the province.

In 2022, the Government of Nova Scotia introduced legislation recognizing Mi'kmaq as the province's first language, and committed to protecting and promoting the language.

=== Religion ===
According to the 2011 census, the largest denominations by number of adherents were Christians with 78.2%. About 21.18% were non-religious and 1% were Muslims. Jews, Hindus, and Sikhs constitute around 0.20%.

In 1871, the largest religious denominations were Presbyterian with 103,500 (27%); Roman Catholic with 102,000 (26%); Baptist with 73,295 (19%); Anglican with 55,124 (14%); Methodist with 40,748 (10%), Lutheran with 4,958 (1.3%); and Congregationalist with 2,538 (0.65%).

== Economy ==
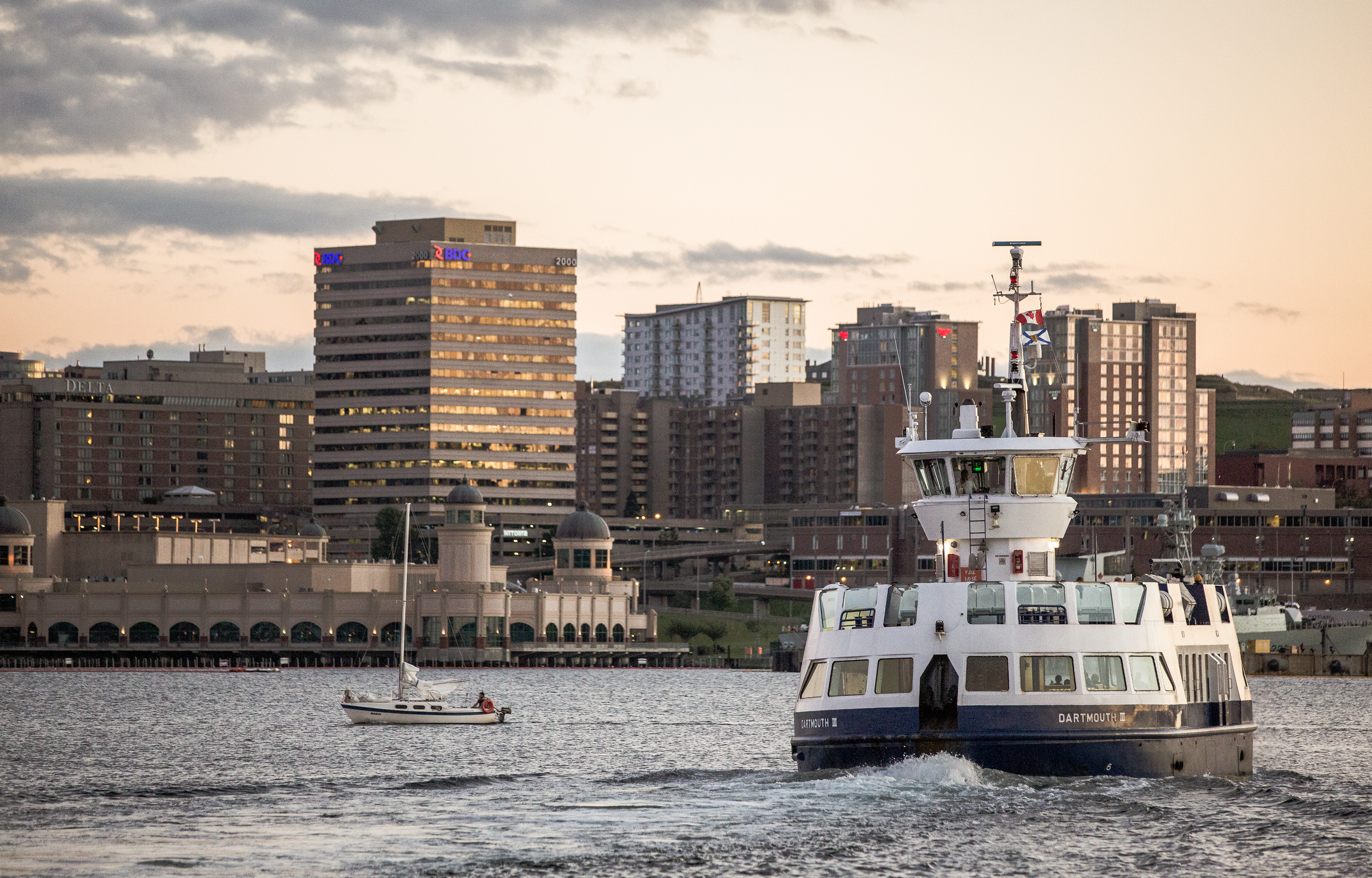
Halifax, the capital and largest municipality, is the economic hub of Nova Scotia

Nova Scotia's per capita GDP in 2016 was CA$44,924, significantly lower than the national average per capita GDP of CA$57,574. GDP growth has lagged behind the rest of the country for at least the past decade. In 2017, the median family income in Nova Scotia was $85,970, below the national average of $92,990; in Halifax the figure rises to $98,870.

The province's export value of fish exceeds $1 billion, and fish products are received by 90 countries around the world. Nevertheless, the province's imports far exceed its exports. While these numbers were roughly equal from 1992 until 2004, since that time the trade deficit has ballooned. In 2012, exports from Nova Scotia were 12.1% of provincial GDP, while imports were 22.6%.

The rise of Nova Scotia as a viable jurisdiction in North America, historically, was driven by the ready availability of natural resources, especially the fish stocks off the Scotian Shelf. The fishery was a pillar of the economy since its development as part of New France in the 17th century; however, the fishery suffered a sharp decline due to overfishing in the late 20th century. The collapse of the cod stocks and the closure of this sector resulted in a loss of approximately 20,000 jobs in 1992.

Coal mining in Cape Breton and northern mainland Nova Scotia has virtually ceased by 2001, and Sydney Steel Corporation, a large steel mill in Sydney, closed in 2001. The Bowater Mersey pulp and paper mill near Liverpool closed in 2012. Mining, especially of gypsum and salt and to a lesser extent silica, peat and barite, is also a significant sector. Since 1991, offshore oil and gas was attempted, but operations ceased in 2018. Agriculture remains an important sector in the province, particularly in the Annapolis Valley.

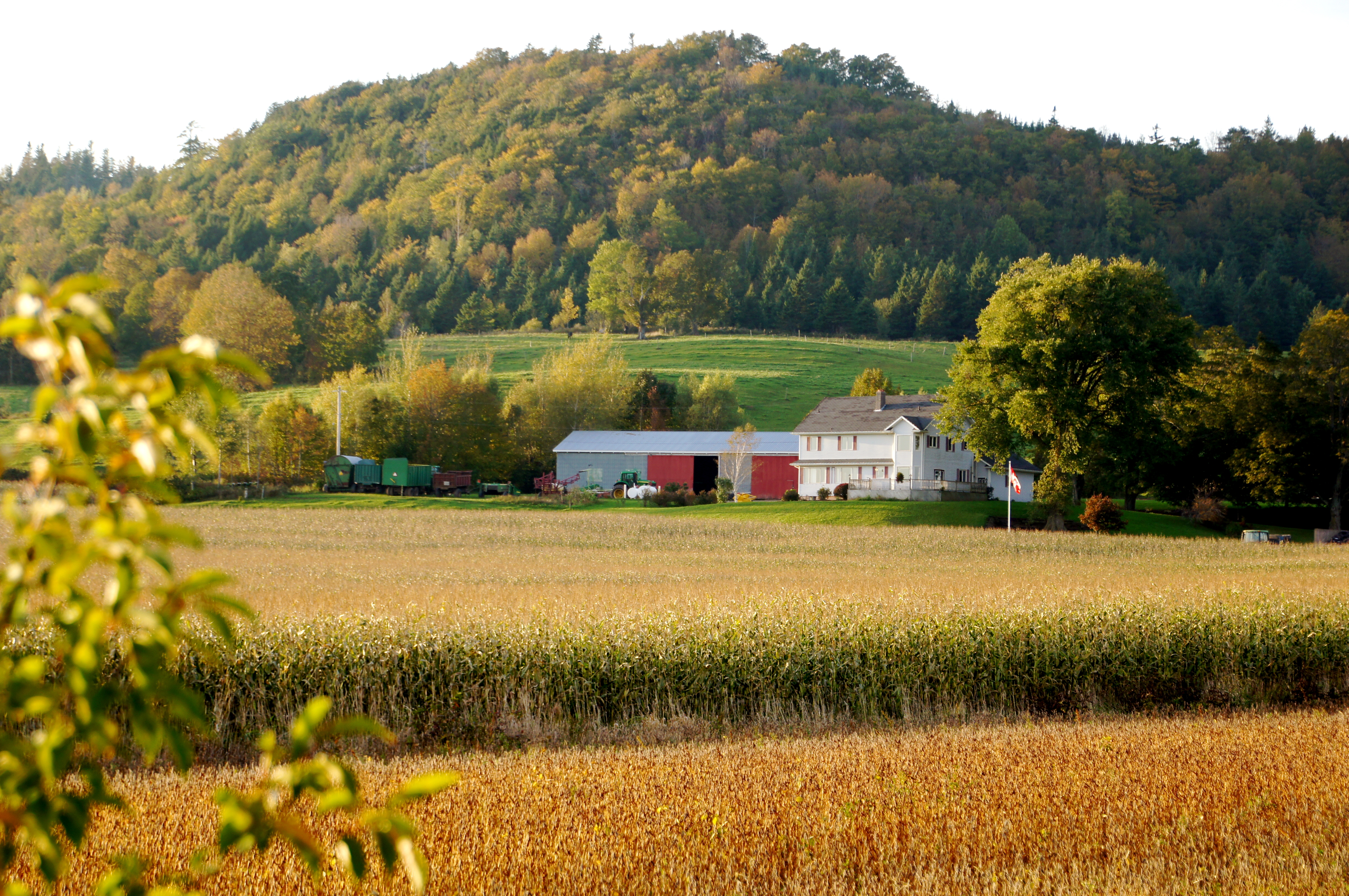
A farm in Grafton. Agriculture remains an important sector of the economy in the Annapolis Valley.

Nova Scotia's defense and aerospace sector generates approximately $500 million in revenues and contributes about $1.5 billion to the provincial economy each year. To date, 40% of Canada's military assets reside in Nova Scotia. Nova Scotia has the fourth-largest film industry in Canada hosting over 100 productions yearly, more than half of which are the products of international film and television producers. In 2015, the government of Nova Scotia eliminated tax credits to film production in the province, jeopardizing the industry given most other jurisdictions continue to offer such credits. The province also has a rapidly developing Information & Communication Technology (ICT) sector which consists of over 500 companies, and employs roughly 15,000 people.

In 2006, the manufacturing sector brought in over $2.6 billion in chained GDP, the largest output of any industrial sector in Nova Scotia. Michelin remains by far the largest single employer in this sector, operating three production plants in the province. Michelin is also the province's largest private-sector employer.

=== Tourism ===
In 2024, over 2 million non-residents visited Nova Scotia. The majority of visitors are from other parts of Canada, with the largest foreign market being Americans, with over 172,000 visits. This industry contributes approximately $3.5 billion annually to the economy. Commercial tourism began with the arrival of approximately 300 New England visitors at Annapolis Royal in July 1871.

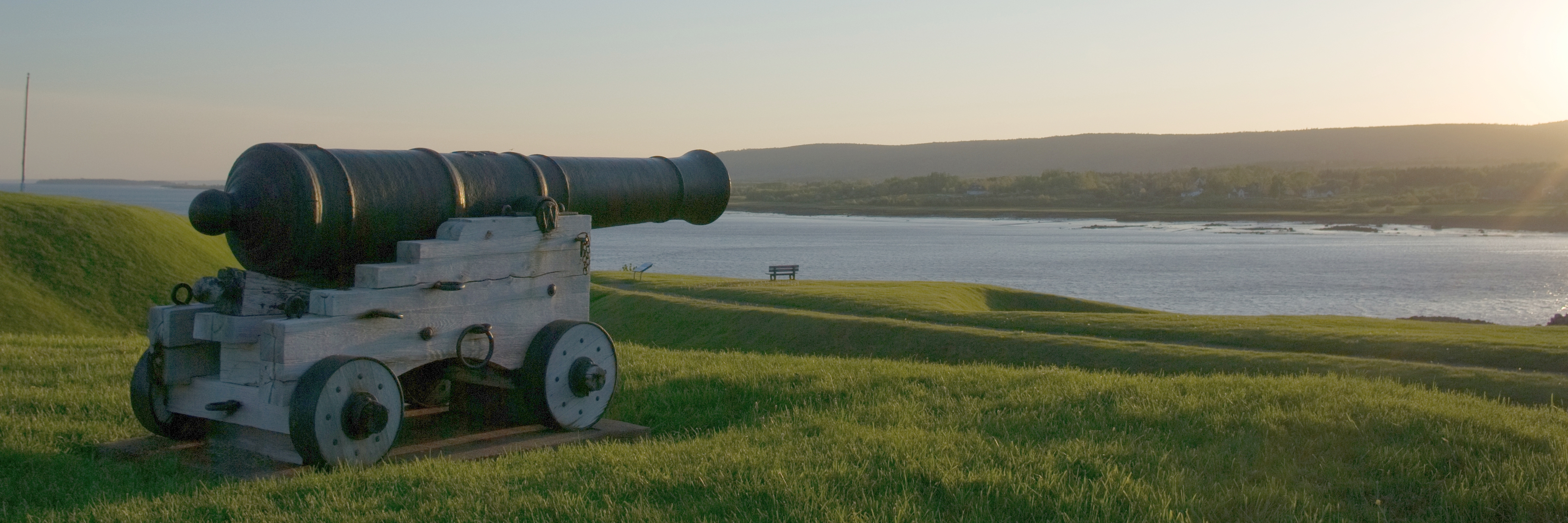
Fort Anne, in the town of Annapolis Royal, is Canada's first National Historic Site

Nova Scotia's tourism industry showcases Nova Scotia's culture, scenery and coastline. Nova Scotia has many museums reflecting its history and culture, including the Glooscap Heritage Centre, Grand-Pré National Historic Site, Hector Heritage Quay and the Black Cultural Centre for Nova Scotia. Other museums tell the story of its working history, such as the Cape Breton Miners Museum and the Maritime Museum of the Atlantic.

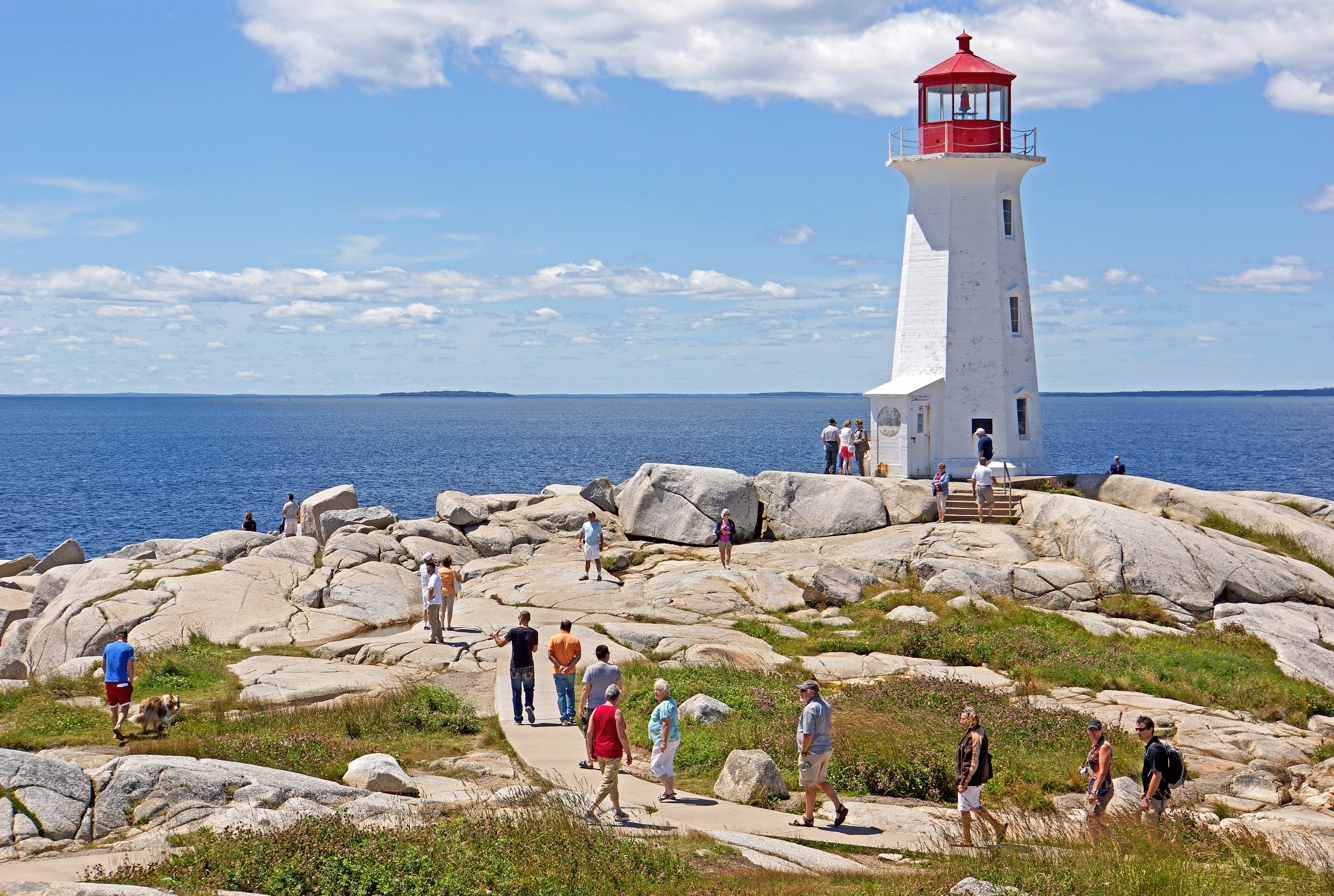
Peggys Point Lighthouse in Peggys Cove is a tourist attraction in the province.

The province has 91 National Historic Sites of Canada, including the Habitation at Port-Royal, the Fortress of Louisbourg, Grand-Pré and Citadel Hill (Fort George) in Halifax. Fort Anne located in the historic town of Annapolis Royal, dates from 1629 and is Canada's first National Historic Site. One of the top destinations, as measured by visitor numbers, is Peggys Cove, receiving more than 600,000 tourists every year. Lunenburg, another popular cultural destination, is a port town on the South Shore that was declared a United Nations Educational, Scientific and Cultural Organisation (UNESCO) World Heritage Site.

Ecotourism plays an important role in Nova Scotia's tourism industry, with the province being home to two national parks of Canada, Kejimkujik National Park and Cape Breton Highlands National Park, as well as one national park reserve: Sable Island National Park Reserve. Nova Scotia also hosts many other protected areas at the municipal, provincial, and federal levels that are popular destinations for visitors.

=== Renewable Energy ===
In 2021, Nova Scotia legislature passed the Environmental Goals and Climate Change Reduction Act, which contains 28 goals to transition to more clean energy production. As of January 2026, Nova Scotia Energy Department stated that they are on track to reach their goal of 80% renewable energy production by 2030. According to Nova Scotia Power, a private utility company, much of the increase in renewable energy has been from wind energy with around 300 commercial wind turbines as of 2026.

== Government and politics ==
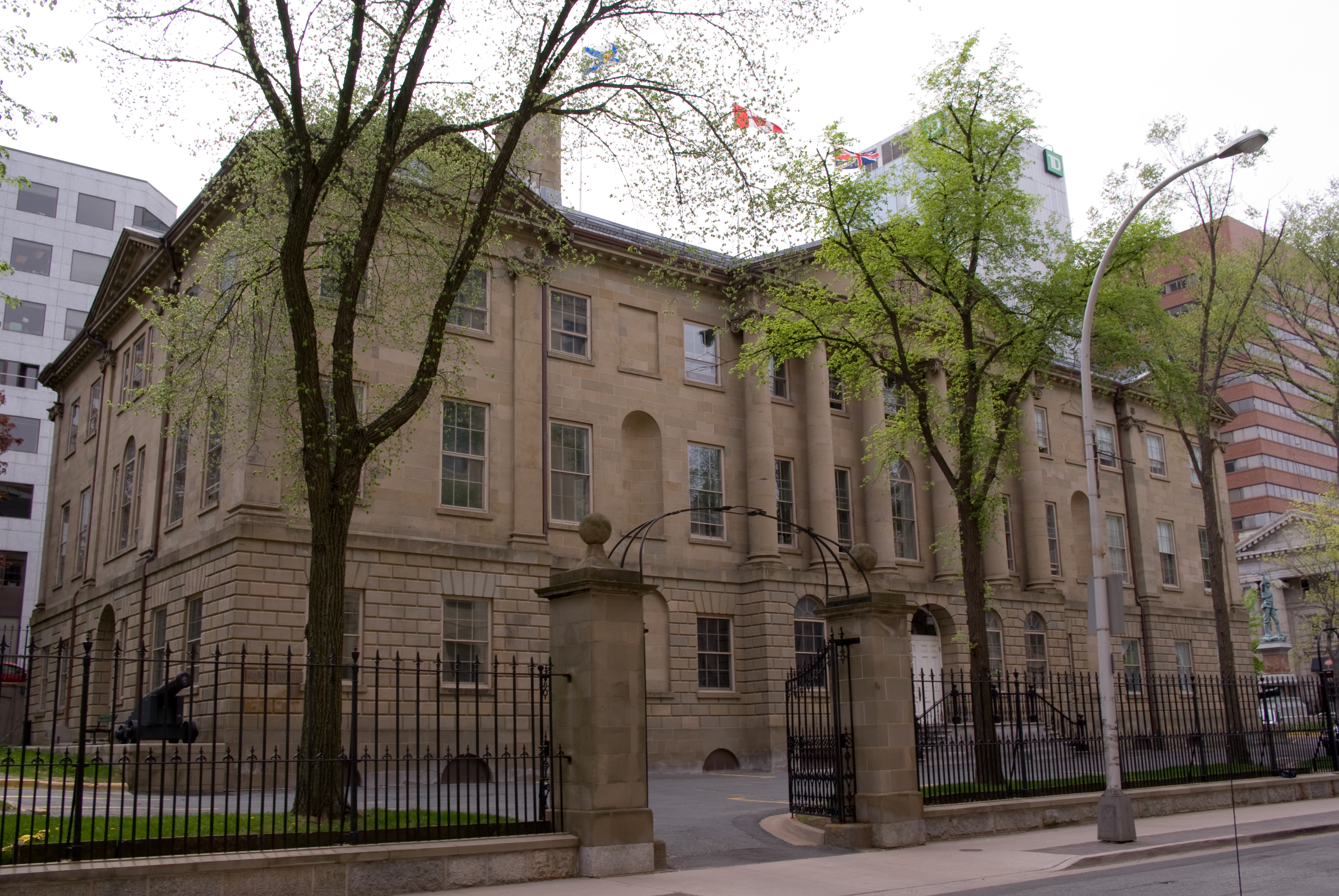
Province House, the seat of the Nova Scotia House of Assembly

Nova Scotia has a parliamentary system within the construct of a constitutional monarchy; the monarchy in Nova Scotia is the foundation of the executive, legislative, and judicial branches. The sovereign King Charles III since 8 September 2022, is King in Right of Nova Scotia who also serves as head of state of 14 other Commonwealth countries, each of Canada's nine other provinces, and the Canadian federal realm, but resides in the United Kingdom. As such, the King's representative, the Lieutenant Governor of Nova Scotia, carries out most of the royal duties in Nova Scotia.

The direct participation of the royal and viceroyal figures in any of these areas of governance is limited, though; in practice, their use of the executive powers is directed by the Executive Council, a committee of ministers of the Crown responsible to the unicameral, elected House of Assembly and chosen and headed by the Premier of Nova Scotia (Tim Houston since 2021), the head of government. To ensure the stability of government, the Lieutenant Governor will usually appoint as premier the person who is the current leader of the political party that can obtain the confidence of a plurality in the House of Assembly. The leader of the party with the second-most seats usually becomes the Leader of His Majesty's Loyal Opposition (Claudia Chender since 2024) and is part of an adversarial parliamentary system intended to keep the government in check.

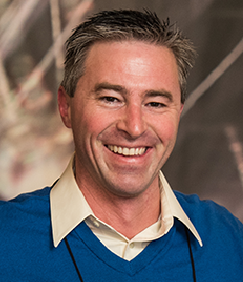
Tim Houston, the 30th Premier of Nova Scotia serving from 2021

Each of the 56 Members of the Legislative Assembly in the House of Assembly is elected by single member plurality in an electoral district or riding. General elections must be called by the lieutenant governor on the advice of the premier, or may be triggered by the government losing a confidence vote in the House. There are three dominant political parties in Nova Scotia: the Liberal Party, the New Democratic Party, and the Progressive Conservative Party. The other two registered parties are the Green Party of Nova Scotia and the Atlantica Party, neither of which has a seat in the House of Assembly.

On 21 July 2022, Nova Scotia became the second province in Canada to regulate online gambling by launching its own online casino through the Atlantic Lottery Corporation (ALC). The site will bring benefits to the economy and provide residents with a safe and secure place to gamble online.

=== Administrative divisions ===
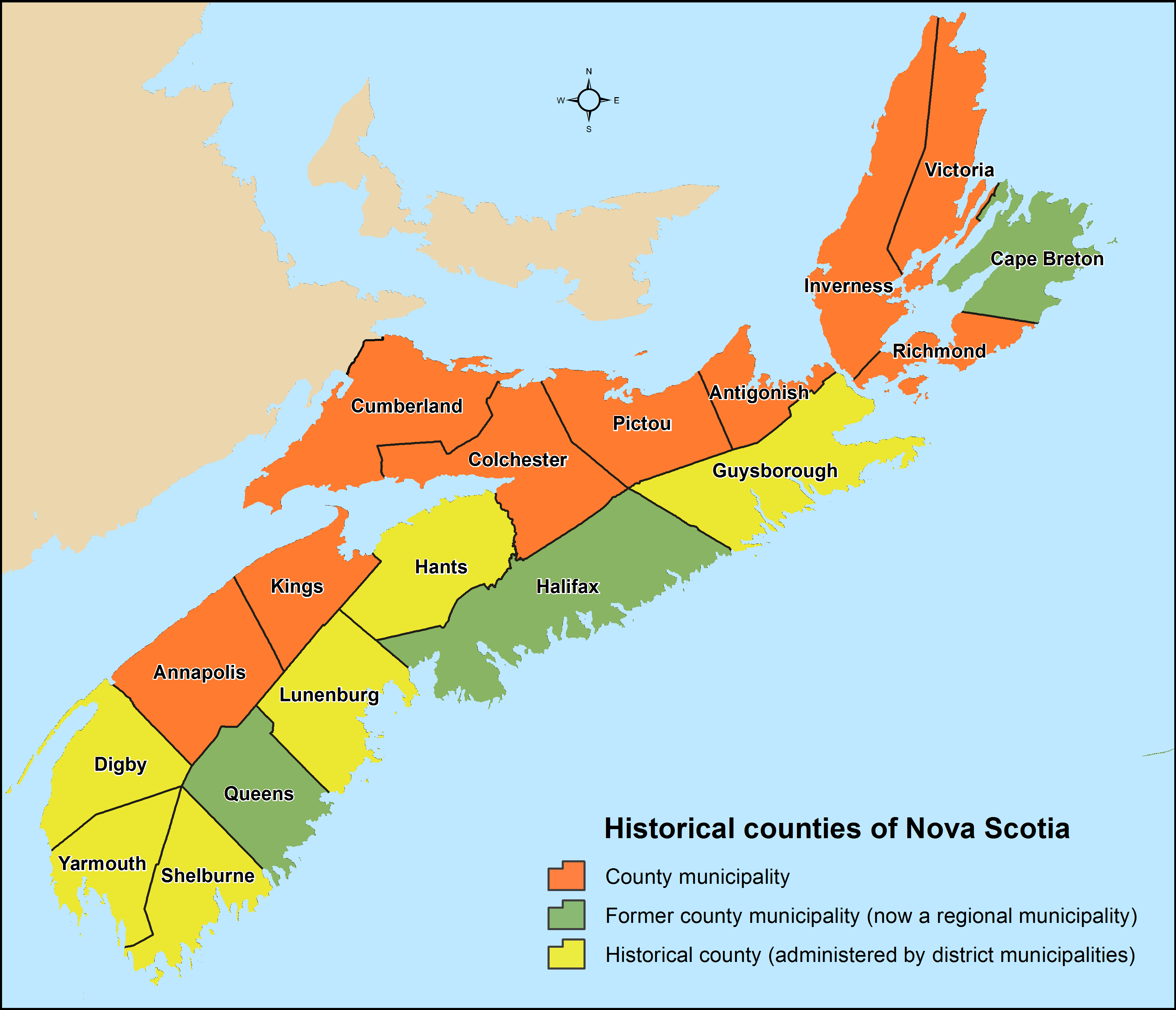
A map of Nova Scotia's 18 historical counties by their current organization or municipal status.

Municipal-level governance is provided by 50 municipalities, of which there are three types: regional municipalities, towns, and county or district municipalities. Villages can exist within county or district municipalities, with a limited authority and an elected council.

Nova Scotia is divided into 18 counties. 9 of the original 18 counties retain a county-level government while the rest are either governed by regional or district municipalities. Regional municipalities are coextensive with the borders with a historic county, while historic counties governed by district municipalities are split into two district municipalities each. Despite this, Statistics Canada uses all counties of Nova Scotia for the purposes of administering the census and presenting its data, and they remain used in common parlance as geographic identifiers by Nova Scotians.

There are three regional municipalities. They may incorporate under the Municipal Government Act (MGA) of 1998, which came into force on 1 April 1999, while towns, county municipalities and district municipalities are continued as municipalities under the MGA. The MGA gives municipal councils the power to make bylaws for "health, well being, safety and protection of persons" and "safety and protection of property" in addition to a few expressed powers.

The regional municipality of Halifax is the capital and largest municipality of Nova Scotia by population with 403,131 residents representing 44% of the total population of the province and land area at 5,490.35 km^{2} (2,119.84 mi^{2}). Pictou was the first municipality to incorporate on 4 May 1874, and the newest municipalities are Halifax and Region of Queens Municipality both amalgamating into their present regional municipality form of government on 1 April 1996.

There are 26 towns, nine county municipalities and 12 district municipalities.

== Transportation ==
=== Rail ===
Via Rail's Ocean service, which connects Montreal to Halifax, is currently the oldest continuously operated passenger route in North America, with stops from west to east at Amherst, Springhill Junction, Truro, and Halifax.

== Culture ==
=== Cuisine ===
The cuisine of Nova Scotia is typically Canadian with an emphasis on local seafood typical of the northwestern Atlantic. Nova Scotia is renowned for its scallops, particularly from the Digby area. As a major lobster producer (Nova Scotia supplied nearly 46% of total Canadian lobster landings in 2021), the shellfish is a common feature at Nova Scotian restaurants and in Nova Scotian variants of seafood dishes. One endemic dish (in the sense of "peculiar to" and "originating from") is the Halifax donair, a distant variant of the doner kebab prepared using thinly sliced beef shavings and a sweet condensed milk sauce. An endemic variant of the Scottish hodge-podge, is a popular summer dish in Nova Scotia. Unlike the Scottish dish, the Nova Scotian variant typically does not feature meat but instead includes seasonal vegetables like carrots, new potatoes, and beans in a rich, cream-based broth.

The province is known for its wine, and produces its own signature wine appellation, Tidal Bay, which must be solely produced from 100% Nova Scotia grapes to legally receive the designation. The Annapolis Valley, in particular, is known for its numerous vineyards and wineries. Nova Scotia also hosts a vibrant craft brewery industry, with more than 50 craft breweries located throughout the province. Many renowned distilleries are based in Nova Scotia, including Glenora Distillery; which produces North America's first single malt whiskey. Apple cultivation is a major industry in the province, which is home to a centuries old tradition of cider making. Many craft cideries are located across the province, particularly in the Annapolis Valley region. In 2025, Canada's first cider appellation, known as Red Sky, was designated for a cider produced in Nova Scotia using only local apples.

As a major blueberry producing province (the fruit is Nova Scotia's largest agricultural export annually, with harvest exceeding twenty-three million kilograms, fifty million pounds each year), the fruit features prominently in many traditional desserts from the province. Notably, blueberry grunt (a dessert dish), originates from Nova Scotia. The ice cream flavour known as moon mist is also endemic to Nova Scotia, and is a popular feature at ice cream shops in the province.

=== Fine arts ===
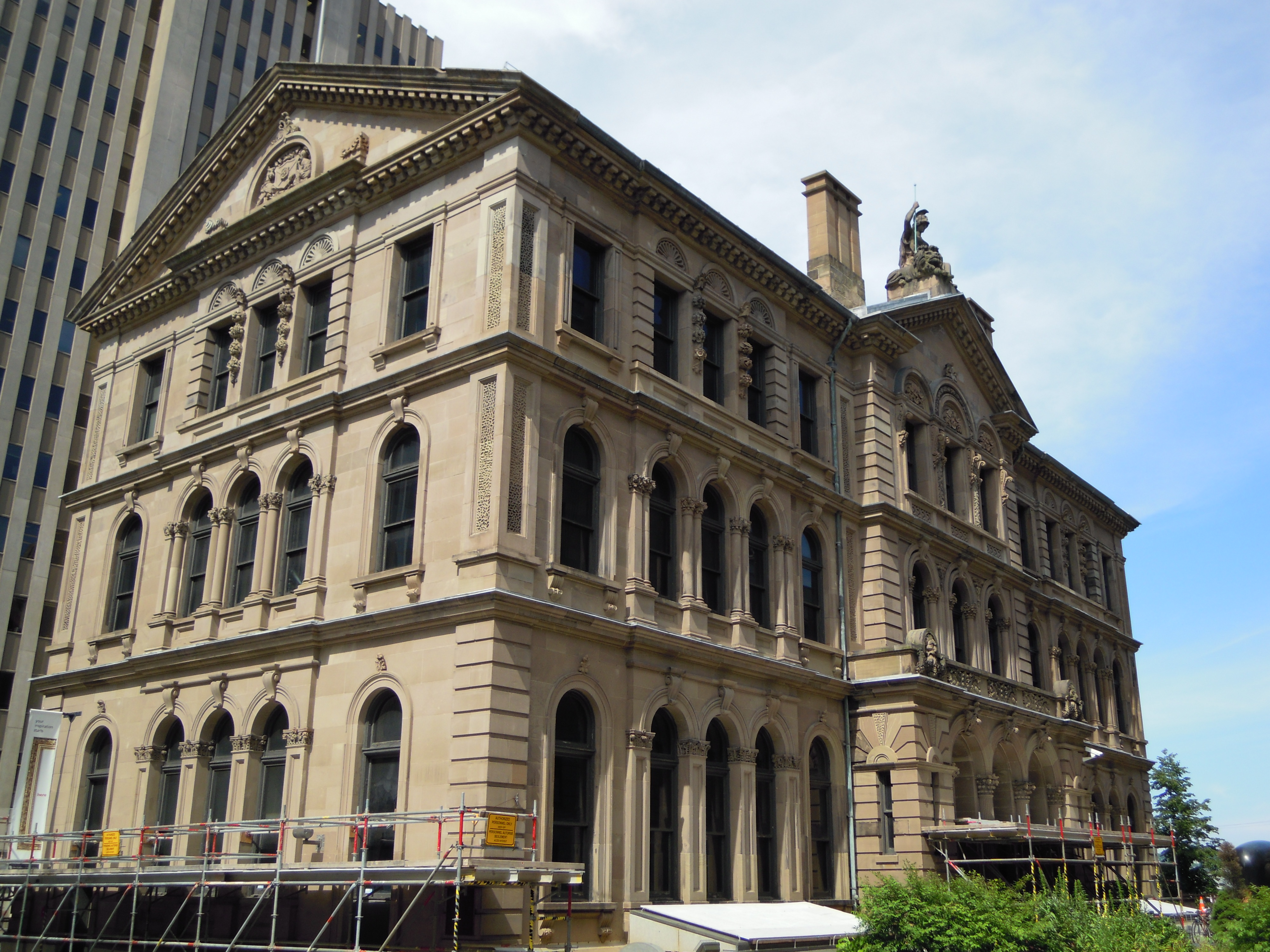
The Art Gallery of Nova Scotia is the provincial art gallery of Nova Scotia.

Halifax hosts institutions such as Nova Scotia College of Art and Design University, Art Gallery of Nova Scotia, Neptune Theatre, and the Dalhousie Arts Centre. The province is home to avant-garde visual art and traditional crafting, writing and publishing and a film industry.

Much of the historic public art sculptures in the province were made by New York sculptor J. Massey Rhind as well as Canadian sculptors Hamilton MacCarthy, George Hill, Emanuel Hahn and Louis-Philippe Hébert. Some of this public art was also created by Nova Scotian John Wilson. Nova Scotian George Lang was a stone sculptor who also built many landmark buildings in the province, including the Welsford-Parker Monument. Two valuable sculptures/monuments in the province are in St. Paul's Church (Halifax): one by John Gibson (for Richard John Uniacke, Jr.) and another monument by Sir Francis Leggatt Chantrey (for Amelia Ann Smyth). Both Gibson and Chantry were famous British sculptors during the Victorian era and have numerous sculptures in the Tate, Museum of Fine Arts, Boston and Westminster Abbey.

=== Media ===
==== News ====
The first newspaper to be printed in Nova Scotia was the Halifax Gazette on 23 March 1752. It was also the first newspaper printed anywhere in Canada. A single copy of the first issue of the Gazette exists today, which was acquired by Library and Archives Canada on 20 June 2002 from the Massachusetts Historical Society in Boston. Newsprint made from wood pulp was invented in 1844 by Nova Scotian Charles Fenerty and was presented to the Acadian Recorder as an alternative printing medium to the paper made from other plant fibers at the time, such as cotton, which was typically made from discarded articles of clothing.

Founded in 1874, the province's current primary daily broadsheet newspaper is The Chronicle Herald, which is circulated to 91,152 weekday customers, with the number increasing to 93,178 on Saturdays (2015). It is the most widely circulated newspaper in Atlantic Canada. The paper does not publish on Sundays. It is owned by the SaltWire Network, the largest media company in Atlantic Canada. The Nova Scotia Government also provides a digital archive of past newspapers via the Nova Scotia Archives website.

==== Radio ====
The province's first radio station was CHNS-FM which first aired on 12 May 1926 from the Carleton Hotel in Halifax by Signal Corps soldier William C. Borrett. Today the station is owned by Maritime Broadcasting System and goes by the on-air brand name 89.9 The Wave and attracts a weekly average of 64,236 listeners between the ages of 25 and 54 as of 2021.

=== Music ===
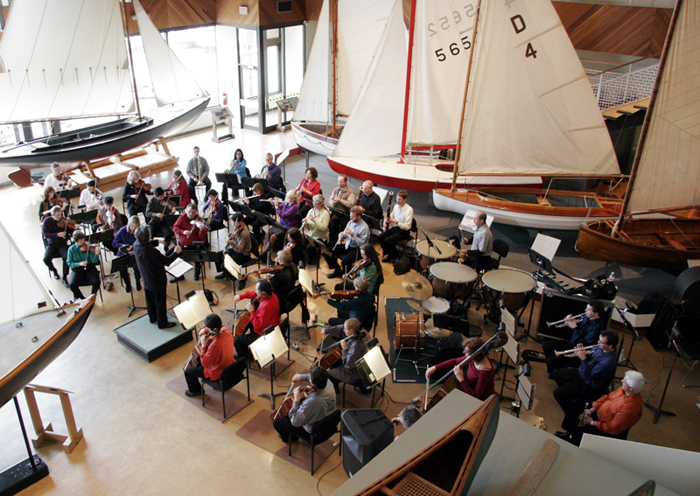
Symphony Nova Scotia performing at the Maritime Museum of the Atlantic in Halifax

Nova Scotia hosts a lively and rich music scene, influenced by the traditions of the various cultures that live there. Many of the songs that are today considered traditional to Nova Scotia were born as working songs, specifically sea shanties were a prominent form of music in the province's coastal communities throughout the 19th century. While no longer practical as working songs, sea shanties are still closely associated with the province's musical culture. Traditional music in Nova Scotia bears a heavy Celtic influence owing to the large numbers of settlers from Ireland and the Scottish Highlands coming to the province in the 19th century. Every year, Cape Breton Island hosts the Celtic Colours International Festival, which celebrates and showcases the region's Celtic music.

Nova Scotia has produced many significant songwriters, such as Grammy Award winning Gordie Sampson, who has written songs for Carrie Underwood ("Jesus, Take the Wheel", "Just a Dream", "Get Out of This Town"), Martina McBride ("If I Had Your Name", "You're Not Leavin Me"), LeAnn Rimes ("Long Night", "Save Myself"), and George Canyon ("My Name"). Many of Hank Snow's songs went on to be recorded by the likes of The Rolling Stones, Elvis Presley, and Johnny Cash. Cape Bretoners Allister MacGillivray and Leon Dubinsky have both written songs which, by being covered by so many popular artists, and by entering the repertoire of so many choirs around the world, have become iconic representations of Nova Scotian style, values and ethos. Dubinsky's pop ballad "We Rise Again" might be called the unofficial anthem of Cape Breton.

=== Sports ===
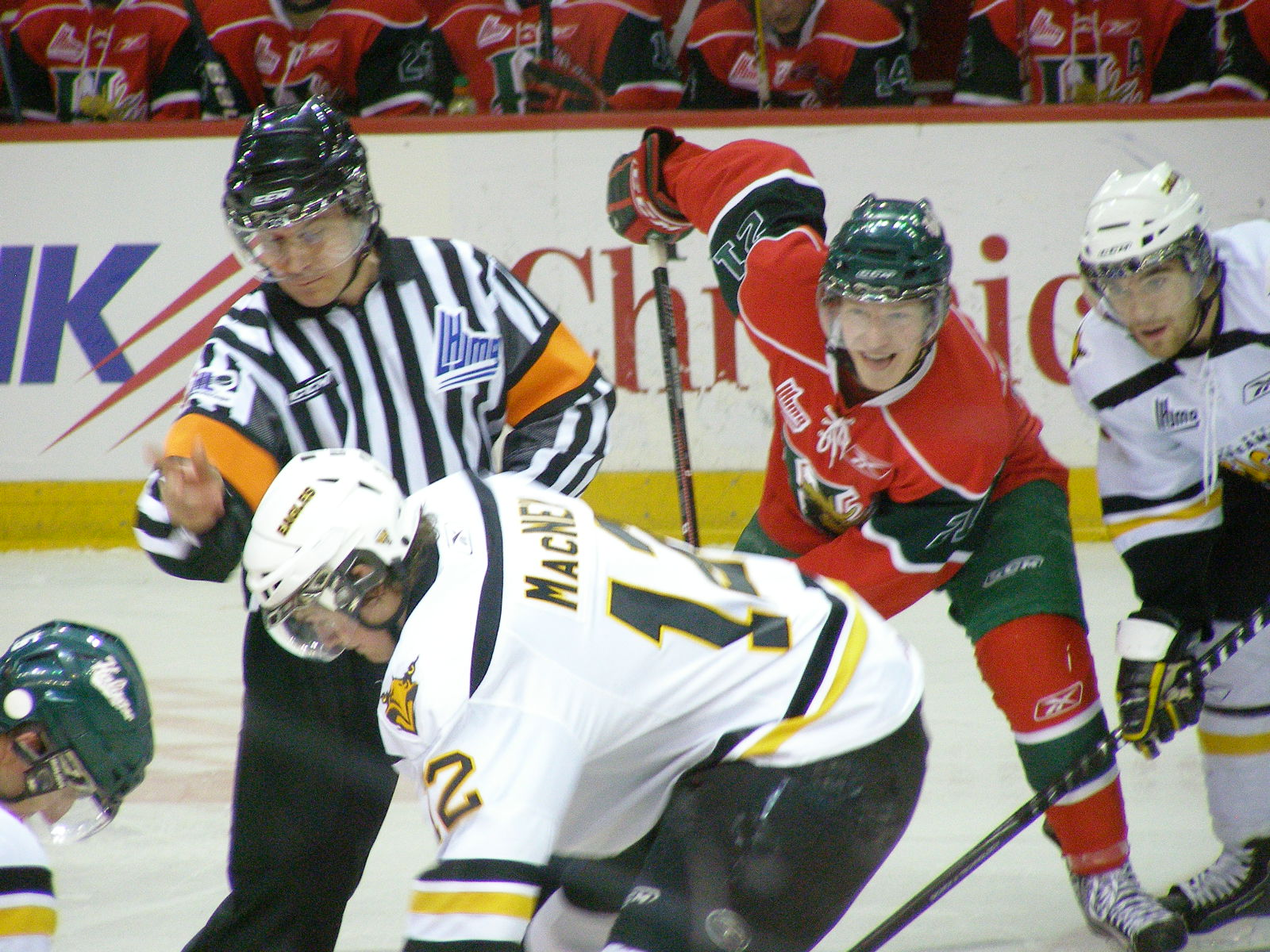
An ice hockey game between the Cape Breton Screaming Eagles, and the Halifax Mooseheads, two Major Junior hockey teams in Nova Scotia

Sport is an important part of Nova Scotia culture. There are numerous semi pro, university and amateur sports teams, for example, The Halifax Mooseheads, 2013 Canadian Hockey League Memorial Cup Champions, and the Cape Breton Eagles, both of the Quebec Maritime Junior Hockey League. The Halifax Hurricanes of the National Basketball League of Canada were another team that called Nova Scotia home, and were 2016 league champions. Professional soccer came to the province in 2019 in the form of Canadian Premier League club HFX Wanderers FC. The province is also home to the National Lacrosse League's Halifax Thunderbirds, who relocated from Rochester, NY in 2019.

The achievements of Nova Scotian athletes are presented at the Nova Scotia Sport Hall of Fame.

== Education ==
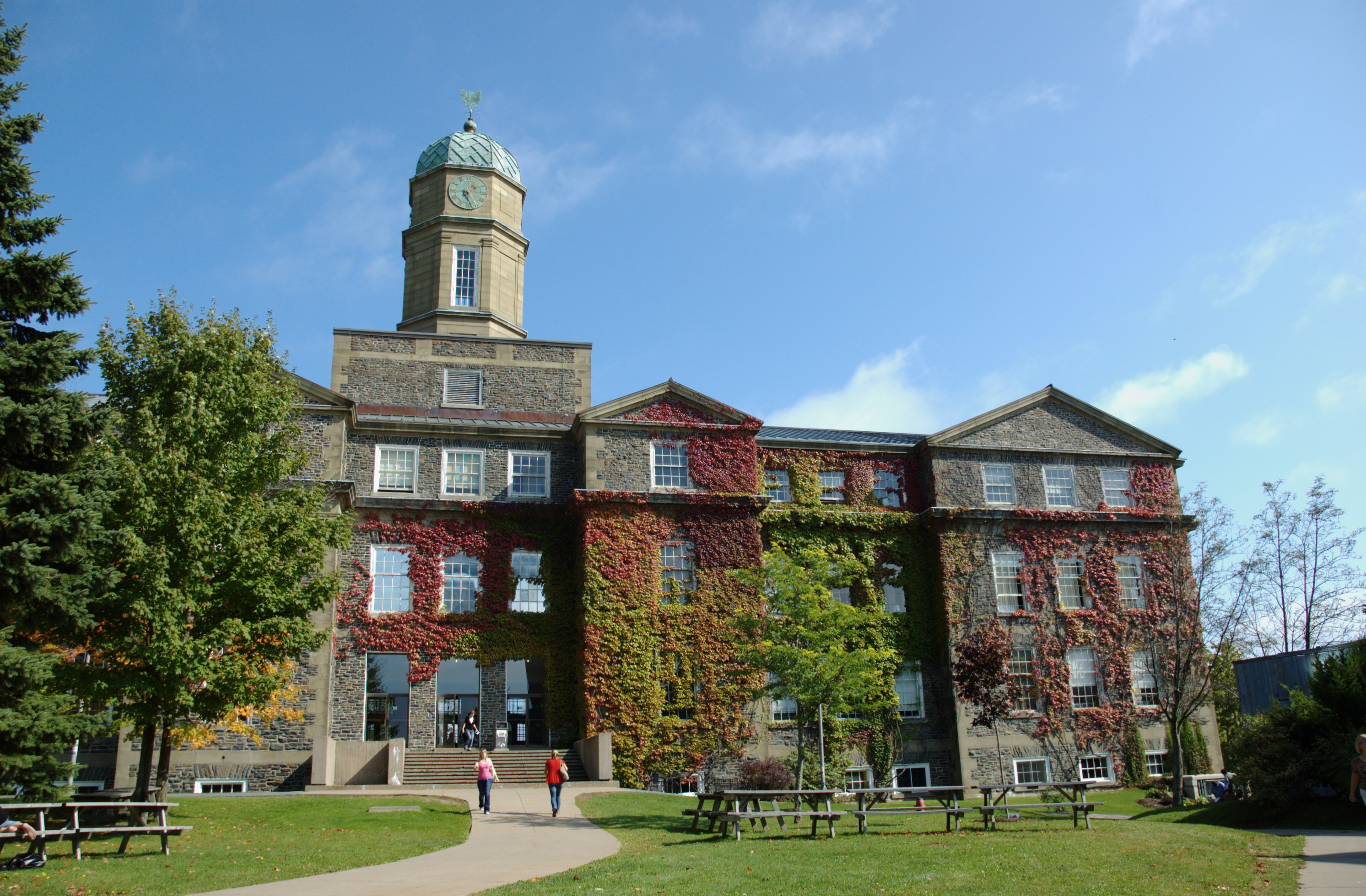
A view of Dalhousie University's Henry Hicks building located at the university's historic Studley Campus in Halifax.

The Minister of Education is responsible for the administration and delivery of education, as defined by the Education Act and other acts relating to colleges, universities and private schools. The powers of the Minister and the Department of Education are defined by the Ministerial regulations and constrained by the Governor-In-Council regulations.

All children under the age of 16 are legally required to attend school unless the parents perform home schooling. Nova Scotia's education system is split up into eight different regions including; Tri-County (22 schools), Annapolis Valley (42 schools), South Shore (25 schools), Chignecto-Central (67 schools), Halifax (135 schools), Strait (20 schools), and Cape Breton-Victoria Regional Centre for Education (39 schools).

Nova Scotia has more than 450 public schools for children. The public system offers primary to Grade 12. There are also private schools in the province. Public education is administered by seven regional school boards, responsible primarily for English instruction and French immersion, and province-wide by the Conseil Scolaire Acadien Provincial, which administers French instruction to students whose primary language is French.

=== Post-secondary education ===
The Nova Scotia Community College system operates 13 campuses across the province. Established in 1988 through the amalgamation of former vocational schools, the college focuses on technical training, applied education, and workforce development. In addition to the public college system, more than 90 registered private career colleges offer specialized programs in fields such as business, health care, and trades.

Nova Scotia—particularly the Halifax Regional Municipality—is a major destination for post-secondary students in Canada. The province is home to ten universities: Dalhousie University (including the Dalhousie University Faculty of Agriculture), the University of King's College, Saint Mary's University, Mount Saint Vincent University, the NSCAD University, Acadia University, Université Sainte-Anne, St. Francis Xavier University, Cape Breton University, and the Atlantic School of Theology.

In total, nearly 58,000 students were enrolled in Nova Scotia’s post-secondary institutions during the 2021–2022 academic year.

== See also ==
- Outline of Nova Scotia
