= Citadel Hill (Fort George) =

Halifax Citadel
- Fort George (1796–1828)
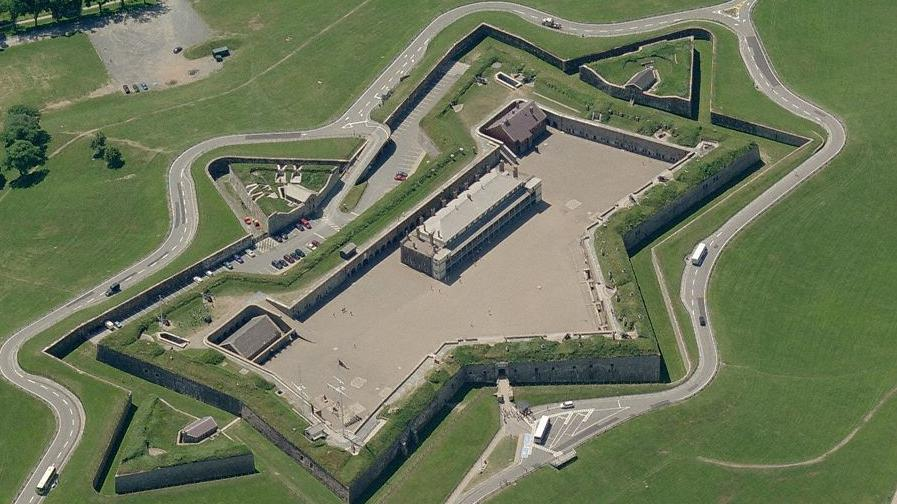
- Aerial view of Citadel Hill
- Interactive map of Halifax Citadel
- 44°38′51″N 63°34′49″W
- Location: Halifax, Nova Scotia, Canada

History
- Built: 1749 (first Citadel); 1828–56 (present Citadel)

National Historic Site of Canada
- Official name: Halifax Citadel National Historic Site of Canada
- Designated: 29 May 1935

Citadel Hill is a National Historic Site in Halifax, Nova Scotia, Canada. Four fortifications have been constructed on Citadel Hill since the city was founded by the British in 1749, and were referred to as Fort George—but only the third fort (built between 1794 and 1800) was officially named Fort George. According to General Orders of October 20, 1798, it was named after King George III. The first two and the fourth and current fort, were officially called the Halifax Citadel. The last is a concrete star fort.

The Citadel is the fortified summit of Citadel Hill. The hill was first fortified in 1749, the year that Edward Cornwallis oversaw the development of the town of Halifax. Those fortifications were successively rebuilt to defend the town from various enemies. Construction and leveling have lowered the summit by ten to twelve metres. While never attacked, the Citadel was long the keystone to defence of the strategically important Halifax Harbour and its Royal Navy Dockyard.

Today, Parks Canada operates the site as the Halifax Citadel National Historic Site of Canada. It has restored the fort to its appearance when built in the Victorian era.

== Predecessors ==
=== First Citadel (1749–1776) ===
The British founded Halifax in 1749 to establish a presence in Nova Scotia as a counterbalance to the French stronghold of Louisbourg, which had been returned to French control the previous year by the Treaty of Aix-la-Chapelle (1748). Halifax was a strategic centre during the next decade in the continuing Anglo-French rivalry in the region. The British had recruited Protestant settlers from England, the Palatine, and Switzerland, and constructed fortifications to protect them against raids by the French, colonial Acadians, and allies from the Wabanaki Confederacy (primarily the Mi'kmaq). This conflict is known to some historians as Father Le Loutre's War.

The war began shortly after Edward Cornwallis, appointed Governor of Nova Scotia, arrived on June 21, 1749, to establish Halifax. He traveled on a sloop of war, followed by 13 transports (some sources say 15) that carried a total of 1,176–2500 settlers.

On September 11, 1749, Cornwallis wrote to the Board of Trade, which supervised this colonial effort:

29th Foot soldiers guarding the construction of the first fort on Citadel Hill in 1749

"The Square at the top of the Hill is finished. These squares are done with double picquets, each picquet ten foot long and six inches thick. They likewise clear a Space of 9 metres (30 feet) without the Line and throw up the Trees by way of Barricade. When this work is compleated [sic] I shall think the Town as secure against Indians as if it was regularly fortify'd."

The first fort was a small redoubt, with a flagstaff and guardhouse near the summit just east of the south ravelin of the present citadel. It was part of the western perimeter wall for the old city, which was protected by five stockaded forts. The others were Horsemans Fort, Cornwallis Fort, Fort Lutrell, and Grenadier Fort. The British also built Fort Charlotte - named after King George's wife Charlotte - on Georges Island in 1750.

The fortified city walls, guarded by five stockaded forts to protect against Mi'kmaq, Acadian, and French attacks, was the centre of a network of fortifications Cornwallis built. Others included Bedford (Fort Sackville) (1749), Dartmouth (1750), Lunenburg (1753) and Lawrencetown (1754).

During Father Le Loutre's War, the soldiers guarding Halifax were constantly on alert. The Mi'kmaq and Acadians raided the capital region (Halifax and Dartmouth) 12 times, four times against Halifax itself. The worst of these raids was what the British call the Dartmouth Massacre (1751). The first raid was in July 1750: the Mi'kmaq scalped Cornwallis' gardener, his son, and four others whom they had caught in the woods near Halifax. They buried the son, left the gardener's body exposed, and carried off the other four bodies.

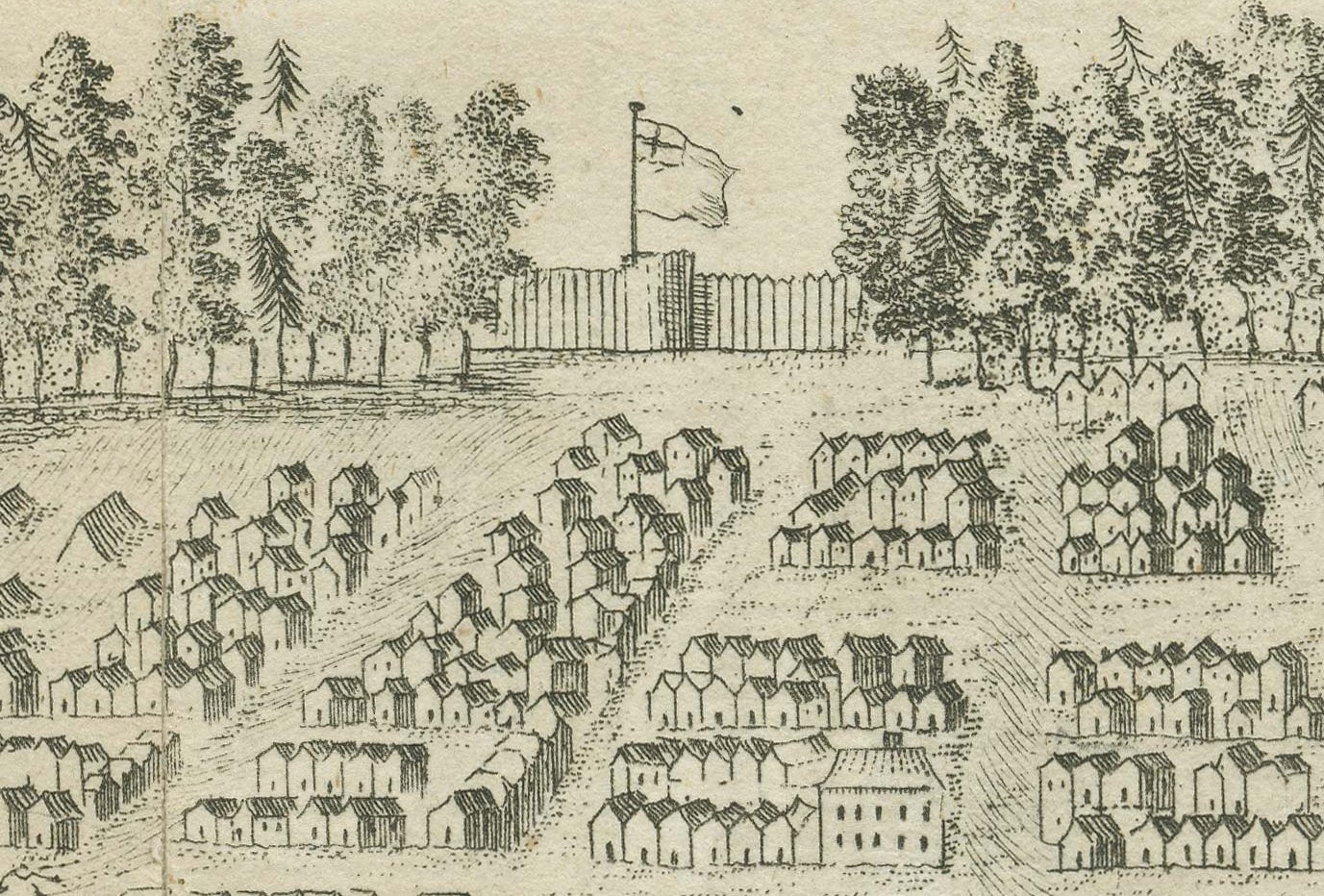
Depiction of Halifax and the surrounding fortifications, 1750. The settlement was protected by city walls and several forts acting as redoubts, including the First Citadel.

In 1751, two attacks were made on blockhouses surrounding Halifax. The Mi'kmaq attacked the North Blockhouse (located at the north end of Joseph Howe Drive) and killed the men on guard. They also attacked near the South Blockhouse (located at the south end of Joseph Howe Drive), at a sawmill on a stream flowing from Chocolate Lake into the Northwest Arm. They killed two men. (Map of Halifax Blockhouses)

In 1753, when Lawrence became governor of Nova Scotia, the Mi'kmaq again attacked the sawmills near the South Blockhouse on the Northwest Arm, where they killed three British. The Mi'kmaq made three attempts to retrieve the bodies for their scalps.

Prominent Halifax business person Michael Francklin was captured by a Mi'kmaw raiding party in 1754 and held captive for three months. Adult captives were often held for ransom, to be raised by families or local communities

The stockaded forts were also instrumental to the British during the French and Indian War (the North American theatre of the Seven Years' War). British soldiers stationed in Halifax helped conduct the expulsion of the Acadians, as many Acadians were imprisoned on Georges Island in Halifax harbour before their deportation. During the war, the Mi'kmaq and Acadians resisted the British throughout the province. On 2 April 1756, the Mi'kmaq were paid a bounty from the Governor of Quebec for 12 British scalps taken at Halifax. Acadian Pierre Gautier, son of Joseph-Nicolas Gautier, led Mi'kmaq warriors from Louisbourg on three raids against Halifax in 1757. In each raid, Gautier took prisoners or scalps or both. During the last raid in September, Gautier, with four Mi'kmaq warriors, killed and scalped two British men at the foot of Citadel Hill. In July 1759, Mi'kmaq and Acadians killed five British in Dartmouth, opposite McNabb's Island.

By 1761, the condition of the Halifax Citadel had deteriorated, and the British built a new one. Although plans were drafted in 1761, construction was delayed due to events of the Seven Years War. Given the threat of attack from rebels in the British Thirteen Colonies after the American Revolutionary War started in 1776, the British constructed the Second Citadel in an enlarged version of the 1761 plans.

=== Second Citadel (1776–1795) ===
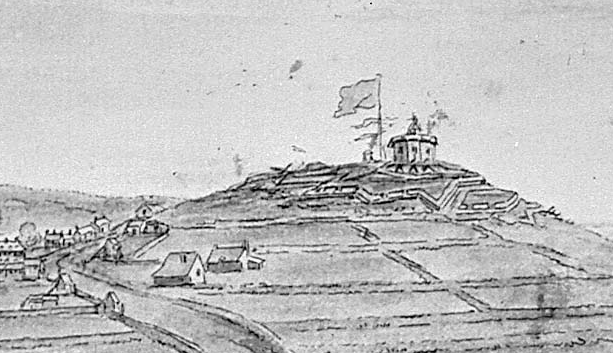
Depiction of Citadel Hill during the American Revolution, viewed from Fort Needham, 1780.

The first major permanent fortification were completed on Citadel Hill during the American Revolution. Built in 1776, the new fort on Citadel Hill was composed of multiple lines of overlapping earthen redans backing a large outer palisade wall. At the center was a three-story octagonal blockhouse mounting a fourteen-gun battery and accommodating 100 troops. These works required that the hill be cut down by 12 metres (40 feet). The entire fortress mounted 72 guns. Citadel Hill and the associated harbour defence fortifications afforded the Royal Navy the most secure and strategic base in eastern North America from its Halifax Dockyard commanding the Great Circle Route to western Europe and gave Halifax the nickname "Warden of The North". The massive British military presence in Halifax focused through Citadel Hill and the Royal Navy's dockyard is thought to be one of the main reasons that Nova Scotia—the fourteenth British colony—remained loyal to the Crown throughout and after the American Revolutionary War.

Neither French nor American forces attacked Citadel Hill during the American Revolution. But the garrison remained on guard because of the numerous rebel American privateer raids on villages around the province (such as the Raid on Lunenburg), and the naval battles off the shore of Halifax.

By 1784 the fortification was in ruins except for the blockhouse. During the French Revolutionary Wars, the British Commander-in-Chief, North America, Prince Edward, found the fortifications inadequate for the city's defence. Although plans for the Third Citadel were drafted in 1795, construction for the new fortification did not begin until 1796, after the Second Citadel was dismantled.

=== Third Citadel (1796–1828) ===
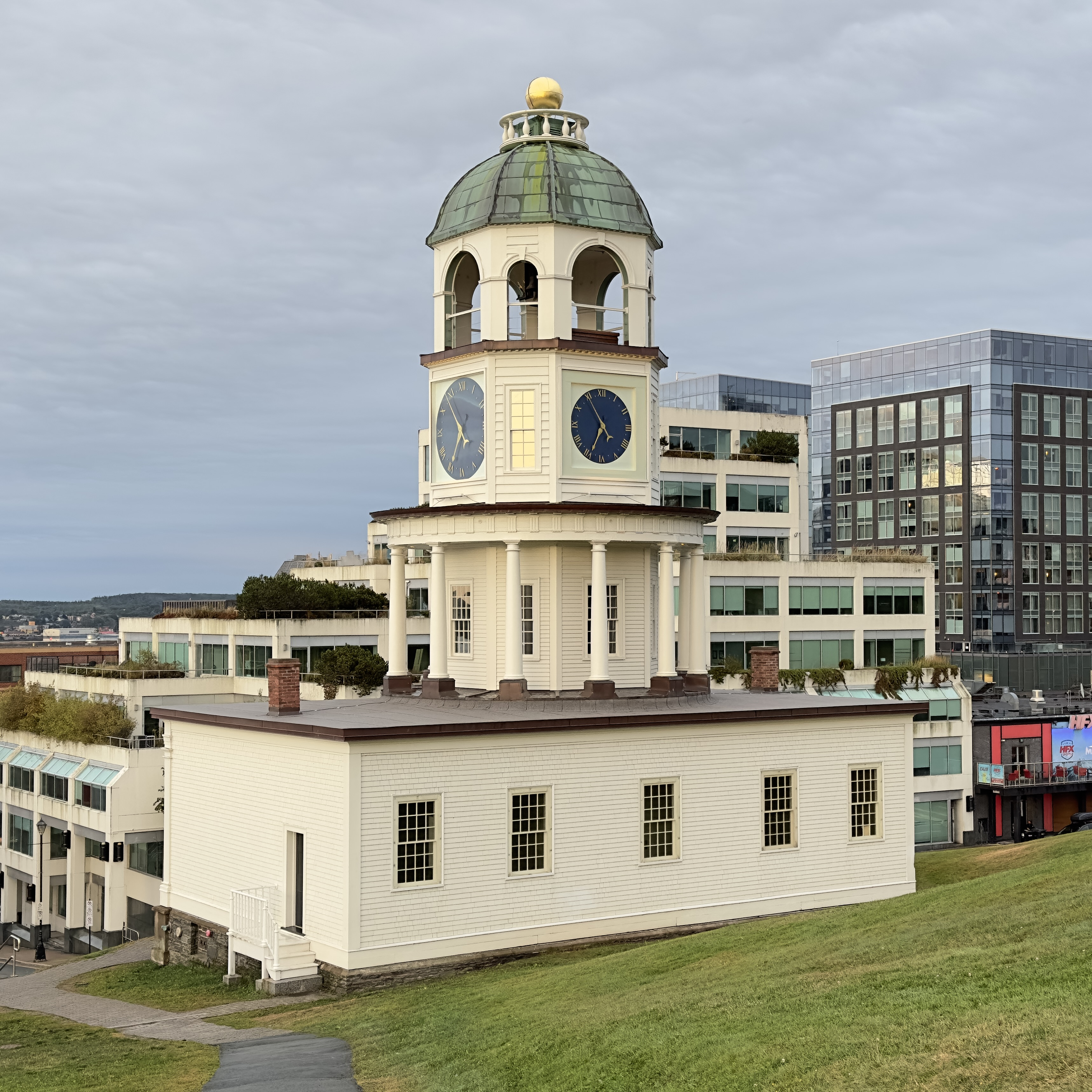
Built in 1803, the Halifax Town Clock is a major landmark built on the eastern slope of Citadel Hill.

The French Revolutionary Wars that began in 1793 raised a new threat to Halifax. A new citadel was designed in 1794 and completed by 1800. Much of the work was inspired by Prince Edward, Duke of Kent, the fourth son of King George III and the father of Queen Victoria, who was posted to Halifax as Commander-in-chief from 1794 to 1800. The top of the hill was levelled and lowered a further 4.5 metres (15 feet) to accommodate a larger fortress on the summit. It resembled the outline of the final Citadel, comprising four bastions surrounding a central barracks and magazine, but used mainly earthwork walls. One bastion was constructed by Jamaican Maroons, who were transported from the Caribbean.

Prince Edward, also commissioned the Halifax Town Clock in 1800 prior to his return to England. The Halifax Town Clock opened on 20 October 1803, at a location on the east slope of Citadel Hill on Barrack (now Brunswick) Street. It continues to keep time for the community in the 21st century. Nova Scotia's first Tel-graph system developed to pass on news of approaching ships to the Citadel and extended to Annapolis Royal. This system of flag communications begins at the Camperdown Signal Station, just north of Duncan's Cove.

The Third Citadel received hasty repairs and a new magazine during the War of 1812 in case of an American raid, but the British did not construct new fortifications. The significant British Royal Navy presence in this area made an American siege unlikely. By 1825 all the works except the powder magazine were in ruins, and a new citadel was being designed.

== Present Citadel (1828–present) ==
Construction for the present citadel began in 1828. However, the star-shaped fortress was not completed until 1856, during the Victorian Era, for a total of 28 years of construction. This massive masonry-construction fort was designed to repel both a land-based attack or attack from the water by United States forces and was inspired by the designs of Louis XIV's commissary of fortifications Sébastien Le Prestre, Seigneur de Vauban. It was a star-shaped hillock citadel with internal courtyard and a clear harbour view from armoured ramparts. The shape of the hill and the "moat area" were structured so as to give multiple lines of fire from defenders. In case of overwhelming attack, portions of the hill had tunnels which could be packed with explosives and detonated from the fort; these tunnels extend about 100 feet from the outerwalls and are T-shaped, the top of the T about 50 feet wide. Brick walled about 4 feet high and 4 feet wide, the top is made of stone slabs topped with gravel, then dirt and sod. The intention was that gravel would act as shrapnel. Between 1820 and 1831, the British had constructed a similar, albeit larger, citadel in Quebec City known as the Citadel of Quebec.

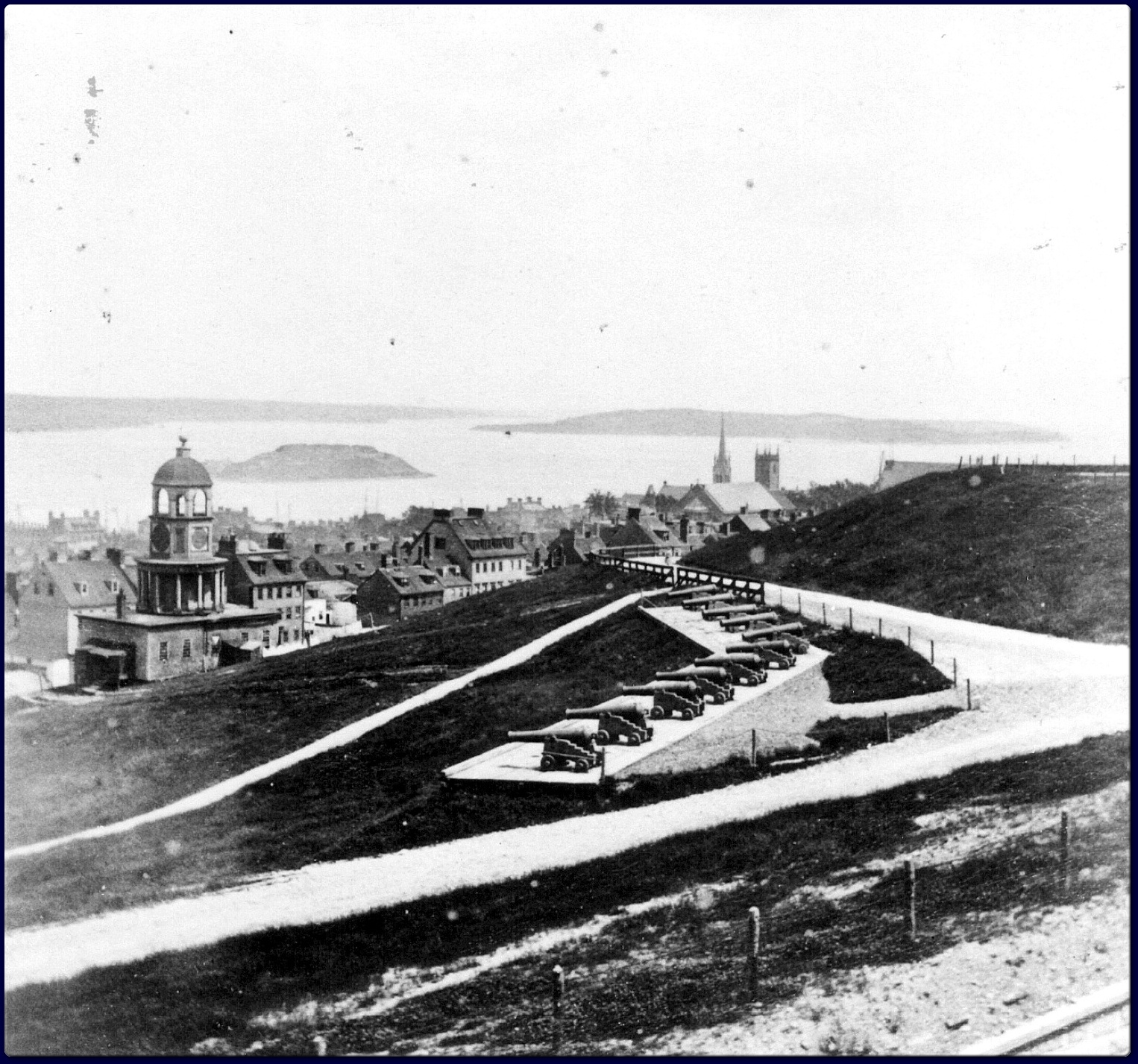
View of Citadel Hill, with its cannons pointed towards Halifax Harbour. Completed in 1856, the fortification was designed also to repel a land-based attack by the United States.

The soldiers at the Halifax Citadel were on alert when Nova Scotia became the site of two international incidents during the American Civil War: the Chesapeake Affair, when Maritime Confederate sympathizers captured a United States ship, killing an American in the process. American warships entered these waters to recapture the ship. In addition, Confederate John Taylor Wood escaped from Halifax Harbour on the CSS Tallahassee.

The Halifax Citadel was constructed to defend against smoothbore weaponry; it became obsolete following the introduction of more powerful rifled guns in the 1860s. British forces upgraded Fort George's armaments to permit it to defend the harbour as well as land approaches, using heavier and more accurate long-range artillery. The Citadel's two large ammunition magazines also served as the central explosive store for Halifax defences, making Citadel Hill, according to the historian and novelist Thomas Head Raddall, "like Vesuvius over Pompeii, a smiling monster with havoc in its belly". By the end of the 19th century, the role of the Citadel in the defence of Halifax Harbour had evolved as it was used as a command centre for other, more distant harbour defensive works. It also provided barrack accommodations.

The 78th (Highlanders) Regiment of Foot were stationed at Halifax for almost three years (1869-1871). The regiment arrived in Halifax on the afternoon of May 14 aboard the troopship HMS Crocodile. A total of 765 men disembarked in full dress uniform. The Regiment was divided into two depots and eight service companies, consisting in all of 34 officers, 49 sergeants, 21 drummers, 6 pipers, and 600 rank and file.

For two years, the regiment was billeted at the Halifax Citadel and at Wellington Barracks. The latter is now known as Stadacona and is part of Canadian Forces Base Halifax. Each summer, men from the regiment camped at Bedford to practice musketry at the military range.

Before their departure in 1871, a farewell ball was arranged for them, complete with a musical tribute composed in their honour. It was hosted by Alexander Keith, mayor of Halifax and noted brewmaster, who became Grandmaster of the Mason Lodge of Nova Scotia. On November 25, the regiment set sail for Ireland on board the troopship Orontes. With them went 17 young Nova Scotian women who had married members of the regiment. Citadel Hill's various fortifications were garrisoned by the British Army until 1906, and afterward by the Canadian Army throughout the First World War. It was never attacked.

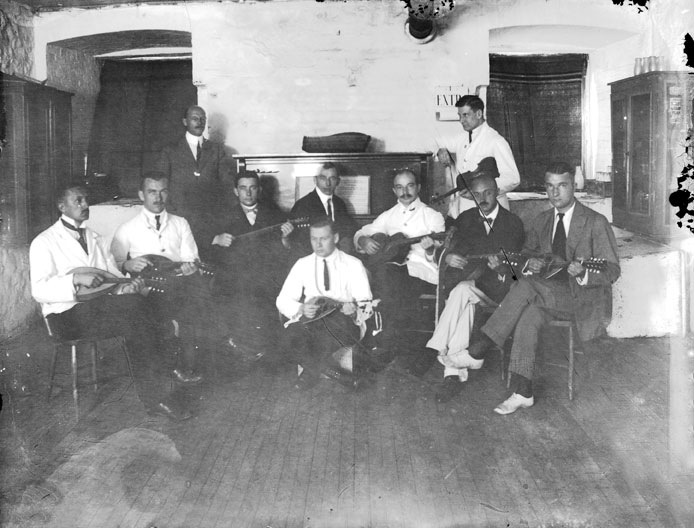
Prisoners of war at the Halifax Citadel ca. 1917 prior to the opening of a permanent prisoner-of-war camp in Amherst

When the Great War began in 1914, there was widespread suspicion in Canada that immigrants from enemy countries might be disloyal. The federal government passed regulations allowing it to monitor and intern anyone who had not become naturalized British subjects. These people were labelled "enemy aliens." In total 8,579 men were held as prisoners of war in 24 camps across the country.

There were three Internment camps in Nova Scotia: Amherst Internment Camp (April 1915 to September 1919); one on Melville Island in the Northwest Arm of Halifax Harbour, and one in Citadel Hill (Fort George) (September 1914 to October 1918). Unlike the rest of Canada, where internees were mostly of Eastern European origin, the internees in Nova Scotia were mainly ethnic German reservists.

Fort George's final military role was to provide temporary barracks, signaling, and the central coordinating point for the city's anti-aircraft defences during the Second World War.

=== Recent history ===
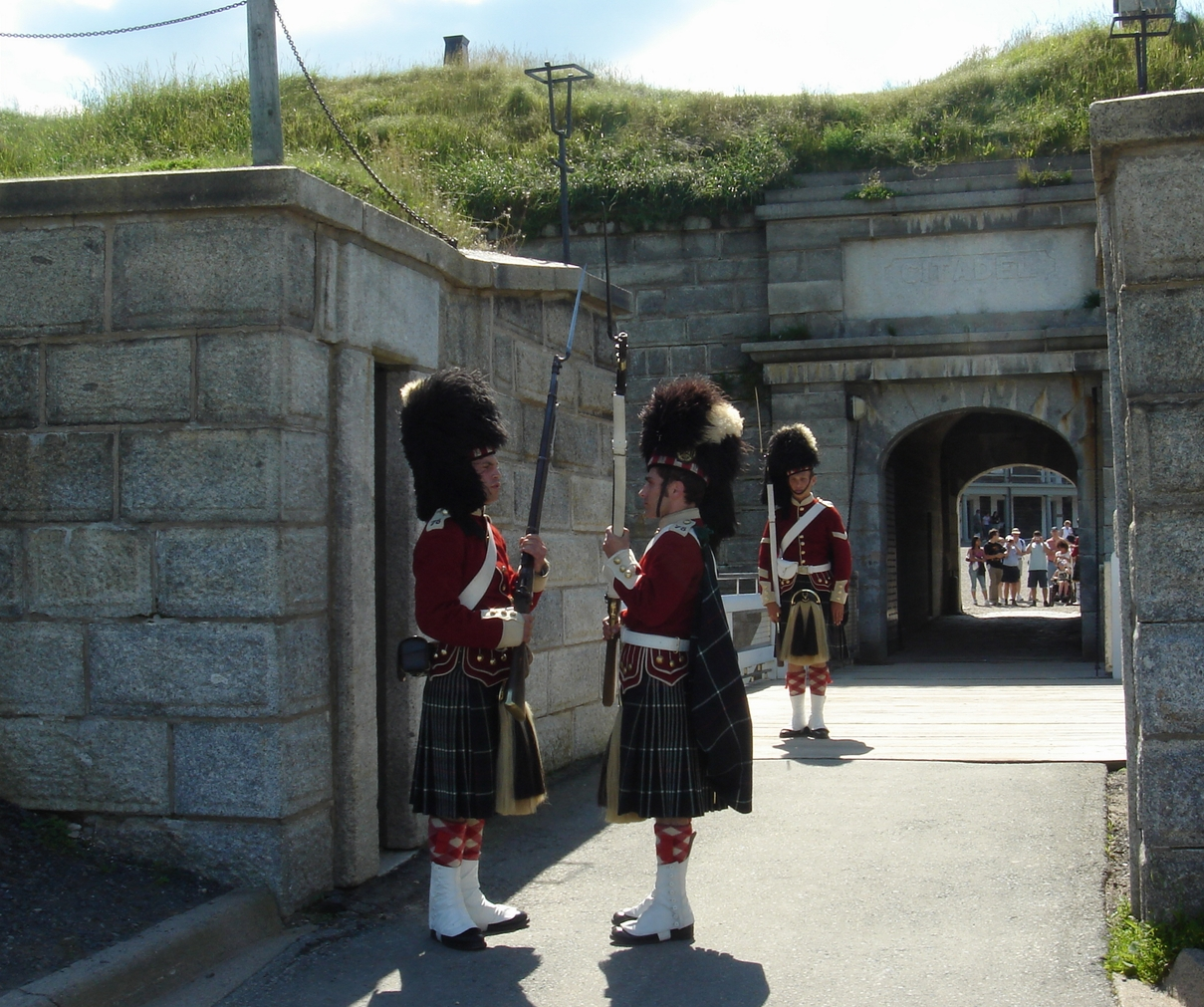
Re-enactors depicting soldiers of the 78th Highland Regiment. The Citadel opened in 1956 as a historic site and a living history museum.

In 1935, the hill and fortifications were designated a National Historic Site and received some stabilization as a works project during the Depression. The fort was not restored and began to decay after the end of the Second World War. In the late 1940s, Halifax downtown business interests advocated demolishing the fort and leveling Citadel Hill to provide parking and encourage development.

But recognition of the fort's historical significance and tourism potential led to the fort's preservation and gradual restoration. Historian Harry Piers conducted research that supported this case and helped raise funds to restore the Citadel.

In 1956, the partially restored fort opened as a historic site and home to the Halifax Army museum. Before the construction of new purpose-built museums, it also served as home to the Nova Scotia Museum and the Maritime Museum of the Atlantic. In the 1990s the Citadel was fully restored to its 1869 appearance by Parks Canada. It was common during the early 1980s for restoration workers to place dated coins in mortar or under replaced stones as the walls were rebuilt, these coins were left as an "unofficial" indication of what areas had been worked and when. Much of the restoration work involved removing stone and breaking down walls, re-engineering, installing 100 mm (4 in) PVC conduits for wiring and waterproofing, then restoring each stone to its original location. The mortar used for re-pointing and techniques were correct to the origin, although modern material of the era were used inside the walls along with plasticised cements. Even the tops of wall were deliberately shaped to the original dimension, angles and material with 200 mm (8 in) thick staggered layers of sod secured by 300–410 mm (12–16 in) cedar spikes.

The site continues to be managed by Parks Canada. The fort is amongst the most visited National Historic Sites in Atlantic Canada.

The grounds of the Halifax Citadel are open year round. From spring to fall, a living history program features animators (re-enactors) portraying the 78th Highland Regiment (stationed at Halifax between 1869 and 1871), the 78th Highlanders (Halifax Citadel) Pipe Band, the Third Brigade of the Royal Artillery, soldiers' wives, and civilian tradespeople. Parks Canada also hosts several re-enactment events each year by volunteers of the Brigade of the American Revolution and the two living history associations.

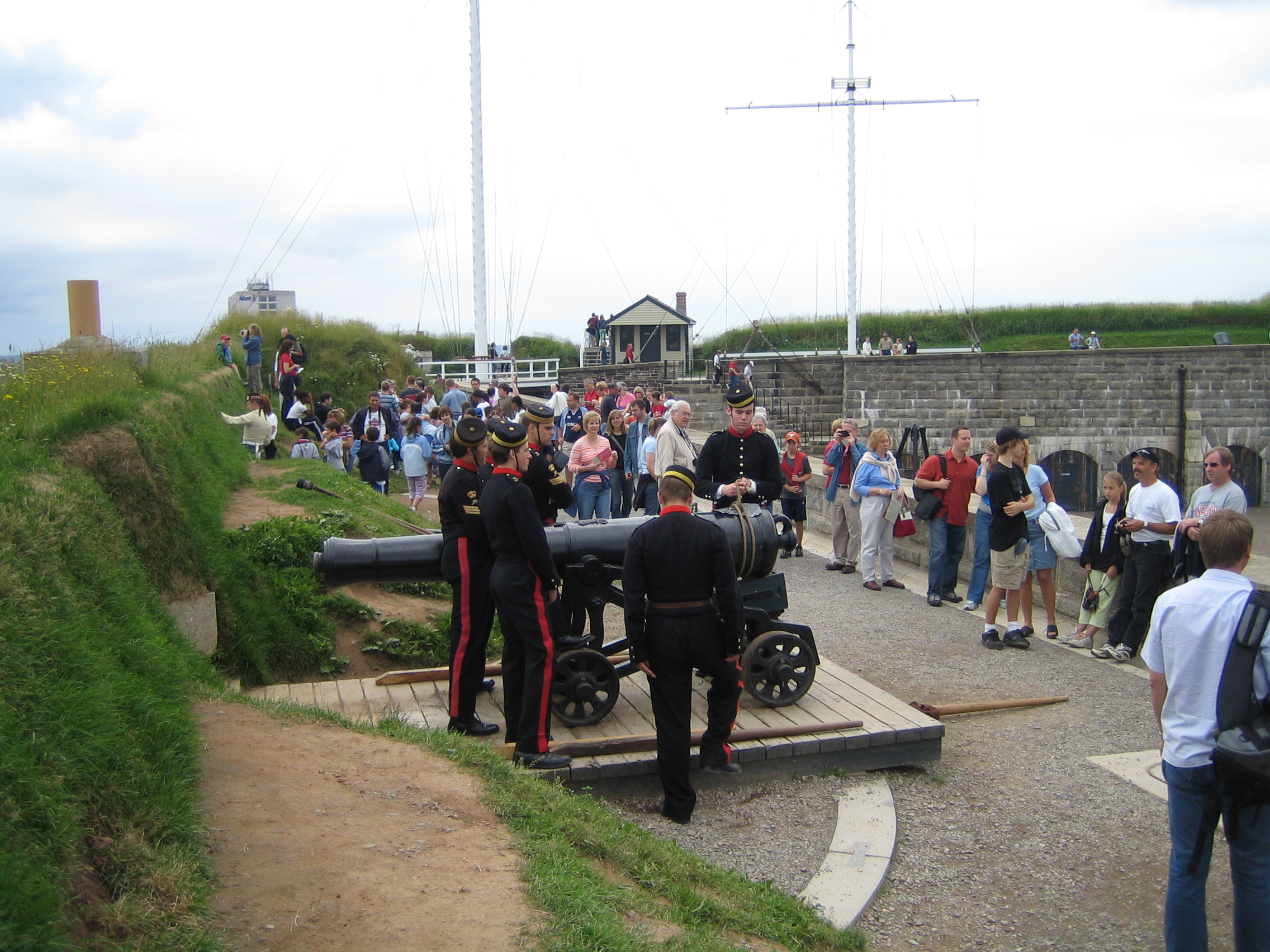
Guided and self-guided tours watch the daily noon-gun firing ceremony.

The Citadel's role in the history of Halifax and North America is communicated through guided and self-guided tours, audio-visual presentations, and various exhibits. On average, the citadel sees over 200,000 visitors annually. A ceremonial firing of the noon gun is conducted daily by staff, and continues year-round, even when the site is closed to visitors. The artillery is also used for formal occasions such as 21-gun salutes.

The "Army Museum", located in the Citadel's Cavalier Block, displays a rare collection of weapons, medals, and uniforms exploring Nova Scotia's army history. It is an independent non-profit museum, and staff work in close partnership with the Citadel staff and Parks Canada.

In July 2006, the Halifax Citadel celebrated the 100th anniversary of the withdrawal of the last British military forces from Canada. The Citadel hosted over 1,000 re-enactors from around the world. Approaching the Christmas season, Citadel Hill annually hosts a "Victorian Christmas". Visitors are treated to crafts, carolers, and games, as well as a visit from Santa Claus.

Ghost tours are held at the fort in the weeks leading up to Halloween.

=== Heritage presentation and tourism ===
On top of the Citadel itself, the historic site houses additional historical experiences for its visitors. The first of which, is the Army Museum located within the walls of the citadel itself. This museum, while situated within the larger historical site, is a community-run operation, which focuses on Nova Scotia's military past via the presentation of various artefacts, photographs and documentation. The Army museum primarily focuses on the histories of Nova Scotian involvement in the First and the Second World wars. Additionally, in the national heritage site there is a signature exhibit - Fortress Halifax, a 550 square meter exhibit housed within the fort, which focuses primarily on the forces that shaped the region from the pre-colonial to the contemporary period. The exhibit includes several interactive elements ranging from their animated digital touch table, to a "dress-up station" which features the uniforms of the Royal Newfoundland Fencible Infantry.

== Halifax Defence Complex ==
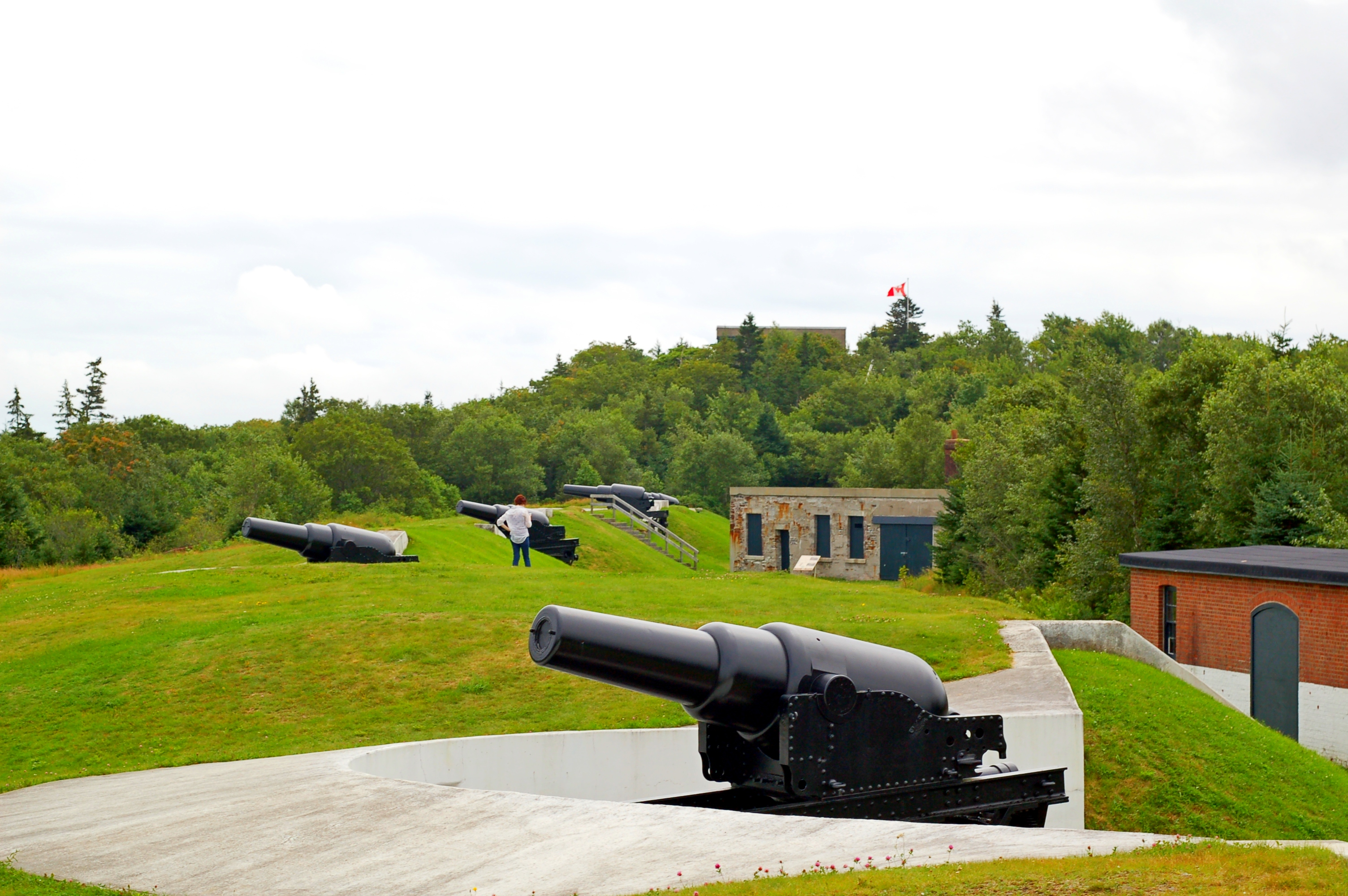
The York Redoubt is a shore battery situated south of Citadel Hill, and a component of the larger Halifax Defence Complex. The Citadel served as the centre of the defence complex.

The Halifax Citadel and its predecessors were the focal point of the defence complex that made up the British imperial fortress of Halifax. Other fortifications that form the defence complex include:

- Fort Needham
- HMC Dockyard
- Fort Massey
- Fort Ogilvie
- Prince of Wales Tower
- Connaught Battery
- York Redoubt
- Practice Battery
- Sandwich Point
- Camperdown
- Fort Chebucto
- Fort Charlotte on George's Island
- Fort Clarence
- Devil's Battery / Hartlen Point
- Five forts on McNabs Island:
  - Fort Ives
  - Fort Hugonin
  - Sherbrooke Tower
  - Strawberry Hill
  - Fort McNab

== In popular culture ==
The Halifax Citadels were an American Hockey League team that played from 1988–93 at the Halifax Metro Center, just below Citadel Hill.

== See also ==
- Military history of Nova Scotia
- History of the Halifax Regional Municipality
- List of oldest buildings and structures in Halifax, Nova Scotia
- Royal eponyms in Canada
