= William C. Borrett =

Nova Scotia radio pioneer and author

Major William Coates Borrett VD
- Born: April 24, 1894; Dartmouth, Nova Scotia, Canada
- Died: 1983 (age 89)
- Burial place: Fairview Lawn Cemetery
- Education: Cowbridge Grammar School in Wales
- Occupations: military officer, author, radio broadcaster
- Known for: Founder of Nova Scotia's first radio station, CHNS-FM
- Spouse: Muriel Hazel Bauld (m. 1917)
- Parent(s): Walter John Borrett (father), Ethel Mary Coates (mother)
- Awards: Medallion for preservation of Nova Scotia history (1950)

William Coates Borrett (April 24, 1894 – 1983) was an author, radio broadcasting pioneer, and member of the Canadian Expeditionary Force in World War I. On June 7, 1917, he married at the age of 23 to 28-year-old Muriel Hazel Bauld (Note: Some official sources list her as Muriel Hazen Bauld. However, William's application to join the Canadian Expeditionary Force lists her as Muriel Hazel Bauld.) in Halifax, Nova Scotia. His marriage certificate lists him as a member of the Church of England and his occupation as a military officer. He founded Nova Scotia's first radio station, CHNS-FM on May 12, 1926, which was broadcast from the Carleton Hotel in Halifax. For more than 18 years his station aired a series called "Tales Told Under the Old Town Clock" which featured stories about Nova Scotia's history. In 1942, he published these stories through Ryerson Press under the same name. On August 14, 1950, at a reception to mark 201 years since the founding of Halifax, Borrett was awarded a medallion for his historical books and radio program that preserved Nova Scotia and Halifax history.

== Relationship with Hank Snow ==
In 1933 while Borrett was the managing director of CHNS-FM, a young Hank Snow sent a letter to the radio station seeking an audition. On March 14, 1933, Borrett responded to Snow in a letter, informing the singer that the artists who performed on his station were paid by the sponsors of the station's programs and that he would not be able to offer Snow an audition unless a sponsor requested him. Reluctant to accept this response, Snow gathered savings and traveled to Halifax, contacting the station while there. He was given an appointment to meet Borrett, but was instead met by Cecil Landry, the station engineer and announcer for CHNS, who gave him an audition on the spot. Borrett later claimed that Snow was the first musician he paid, giving Hank $15 a week to come on air.

== Bibliography ==
Borrett authored a number of books in his lifetime. The following is a list of his published works.

- Tales Told Under the Old Town Clock (1942)
- More Tales Told Under the Old Town Clock (1943)
