= Siege of Grand Pré =

1749 siege in Nova Scotia

- Part of Father Le Loutre's War
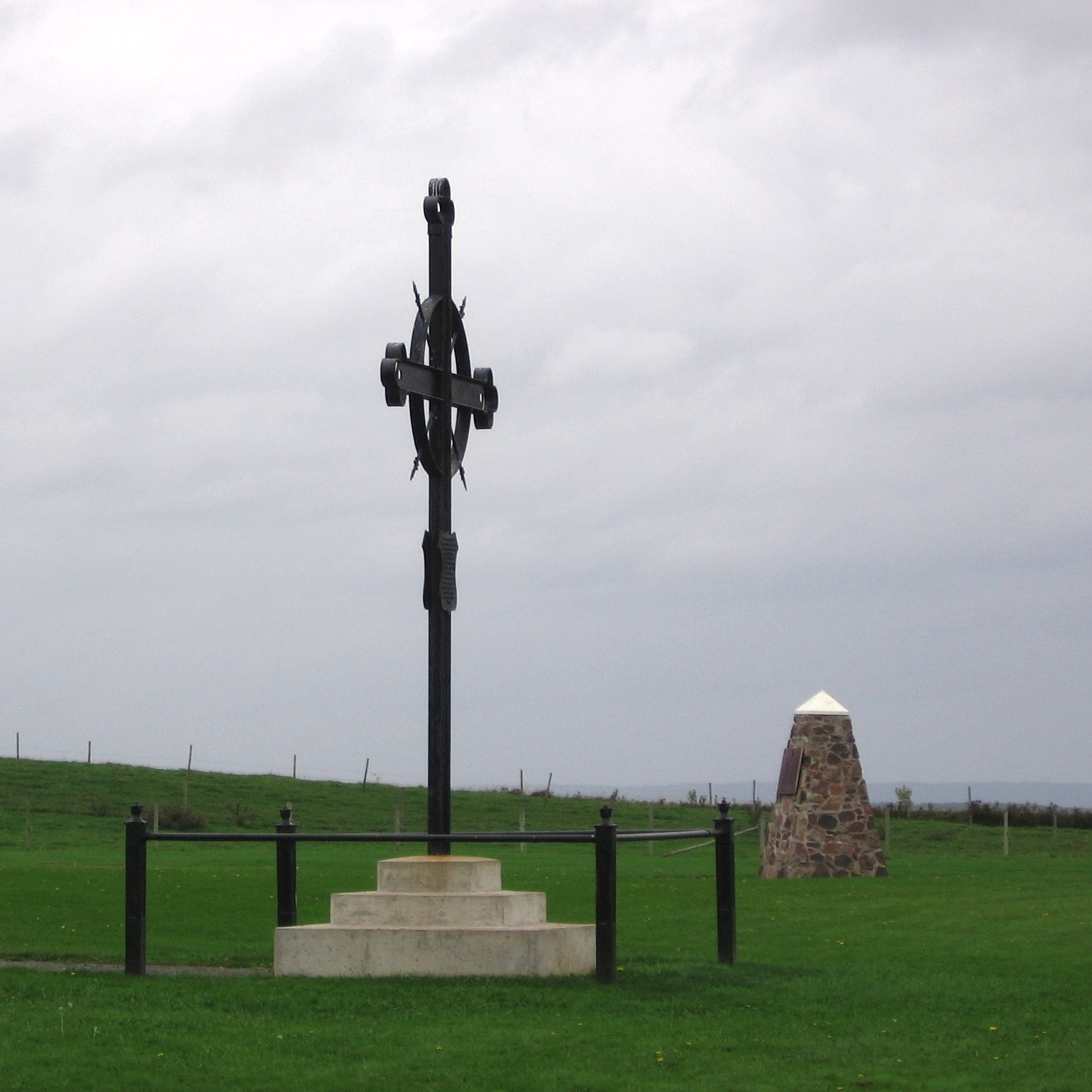
- Site of siege of Grand Pré, Hortonville, Nova Scotia
Date	November 27 – December 4, 1749
Location	Grand-Pré, Nova Scotia (present-day Hortonville, Nova Scotia) 45°6′18.14″N 64°17′55.26″W
Result	British victory

Belligerents
Wabanaki Confederacy (Mi'kmaq militia; Maliseet militia); Penobscot; Acadia militia	British America

Commanders and leaders
Unknown	Captain John Handfield; John Hamilton (POW)

Strength
300 Mi'kmaq, Maliseet, and Acadians	Unknown British regulars

Casualties and losses
Unknown	25 prisoners; 2 killed

The siege of Grand Pré happened during Father Le Loutre's War and was fought between the British and the Wabanaki Confederacy and Acadian militia. The siege happened at Fort Vieux Logis, Grand-Pré (present-day Hortonville, Nova Scotia). The native and Acadia militia laid siege to Fort Vieux Logis for a week in November 1749. (Note: The names of the Acadians as published in Akins (1869), p. 177.) One historian states that the intent of the siege was to help facilitate the Acadian Exodus from the region.

== Historical context ==
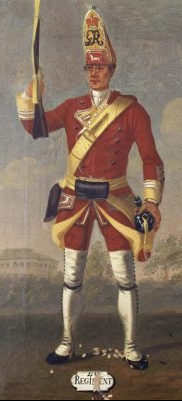
40th Regiment of Foot by David Morier, 1751

Despite the British Conquest of Acadia in 1710, Nova Scotia remained primarily occupied by Catholic Acadians and Mi'kmaq. By the time Cornwallis had arrived in Halifax, there was a long history of the Wabanaki Confederacy (which included the Mi'kmaq) protecting their land by killing British civilians along the New England/Acadia border in Maine (See the Northeast Coast Campaigns 1688, 1703, 1723, 1724, 1745, 1746, 1747).

To prevent the establishment of Protestant settlements in the region, Mi'kmaq raided the early British settlements of present-day Shelburne (1715) and Canso (1720). A generation later, Father Le Loutre's War began when Edward Cornwallis arrived to establish Halifax with 13 transports on June 21, 1749.

Within 18 months of establishing Halifax, the British also took firm control of peninsula Nova Scotia by building fortifications in all the major Acadian communities: present-day Windsor (Fort Edward); Grand-Pré (Fort Vieux Logis) and Chignecto (Fort Lawrence). (A British fort - Fort Anne - already existed at the other major Acadian centre of Annapolis Royal, Nova Scotia. Cobequid remained without a fort.) There were numerous Mi'kmaq and Acadian raids on these fortifications such as the siege of Grand Pré.

Just prior to the Siege, on September 30, 1749, about forty Mi'kmaq attacked six men who were cutting trees at a saw mill in Dartmouth, Nova Scotia. Four of them were killed on the spot, one was taken prisoner and one escaped. Two of the men were scalped and the heads of the others were cut off. A detachment of rangers was sent after the raiding party and cut off the heads of two Mi'kmaq and scalped one.

On October 2, 1749, Cornwallis created an extirpation proclamation. The siege of Grand Pré was the first recorded conflict after Cornwallis’ proclamation.

== The siege ==
On November 27, 1749, 300 Mi'kmaq, Maliseet, Penobscot, and an Acadian militia (11 Acadians) attacked Fort Vieux Logis at Grand-Pré . The fort was under the command of John Handfield of the 40th Regiment of Foot (Cornwallis' Regiment). The Native and Acadian militia killed the sentries (guards) who were firing on them. The Natives then captured Lieutenant John Hamilton (Otho Hamilton's son) and eighteen soldiers under his command (including Handfield's son William), while surveying the fort's environs. (Note: The son of Captain Otho Hamilton and daughter of Captain Handfield were married in 1752.) (They also captured six women and a soldier nearby.) After the capture of the British soldiers, the native and Acadian militias made several attempts over the next week to lay siege to the fort before breaking off the engagement. When Gorham's Rangers arrived the militia had already departed with the prisoners to Chignecto.

== Aftermath ==
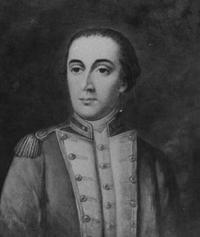
Captain Nicholas Cox

On March 18, 1750, Gorham's Rangers left Fort Sackville (Nova Scotia), under orders from Governor Cornwallis to march to Pisiquid (Windsor). Their mission was to establish a blockhouse at Pisiquid (i.e., Fort Edward), and to seize the property of Acadians who had participated in the Siege of Grand-Pré. (En route, Gorham engaged the Mi’kmaq in the Battle at St. Croix).

The Mi’kmaq and Acadians continued raids on the Protestant settlements, such as the Raid on Dartmouth (1751) and the Raid on Lunenburg, Nova Scotia (1756). For the Maliseet, it was their first breach of the Peace Treaty that they had made with Cornwallis months earlier.

The prisoners spent two years in captivity before being ransomed. In August 1751, Lt. John Hamilton (whose father Otho was formerly on the Nova Scotia Council) and his father-in-law from his first marriage William Shirriff (also a member of the Nova Scotia Council) negotiated the release for Hamilton and the other 60 Englishmen who had been imprisoned over the two years. (Note: When John Hamilton returned to Port Royal, he married John Hatfield's daughter Elizabeth.) (They were traded for a daughter of native chief Captain Sam (Jerome Atecouando - a former soldier of Gorham's. She was taken prisoner at St. John River in 1748 by Gorham's Rangers and kept with Gorham's wife in Boston.) The Governor and Council paid Le Loutre's ransom of £882 to release sixty prisoners of officers, soldiers and settlers, including Hamilton. As late as June 1754, Captain Hamilton wrote Governor Lawrence a letter of support for Abbe Le Loutre. (Note: In 1899, Rev. Arthur Wentworth Hamilton Eaton of Halifax, Nova Scotia owned a portrait of John Hamilton and another of his wife Katherine Arbuckley.)
