= Donald McDonald =

Donald McDonald may refer to:

== Politicians ==
- Donald McDonald (Province of Canada politician), birth and death dates unknown
- Donald McDonald (Ontario politician) (1816–1879), member of the Canadian Senate, 1867–1879
- Donald A. McDonald (1833–1906), Wisconsin steamboat builder and legislator
- Donald Robert McDonald (1856–1923), Canadian contractor and politician
- Donald H. McDonald (1867–1928), Canadian politician, member of the Legislative Assembly of Northwest Territories, 1896–1905
- Donald Cromwell McDonald (1879–1917), Manitoba politician

== Other people ==
- Donald McDonald (ABC chairperson) (born 1938), chair of the Australian Broadcasting Corporation
- Donald McDonald (footballer) (born 1962), Australian rules footballer and coach
- Donald McDonald (athlete), Scottish runner
- Flip McDonald (Donald Gene McDonald, 1921–2002), American football end

== Other uses ==
- Ronald McDonald, the mascot of McDonald's, formerly known as Donald McDonald in Japan

== See also ==
- Donald MacDonald (disambiguation)
- Ronald MacDonald (disambiguation)
- Ronald McDonald (disambiguation)
- Donald Hogarth (Donald McDonald Hogarth, 1879–1950), politician and mining financier from Ontario, Canada
