= Ronald McDonald (disambiguation) =

Ronald McDonald is the primary mascot to the McDonald's restaurant franchise.

Ronald McDonald may also refer to:

- Mac (It's Always Sunny in Philadelphia) (Ronald McDonald), a character from the television series It's Always Sunny in Philadelphia
- Ron McDonald (1933–2000), Australian rules footballer
- Ronald Macdonald, characters in a satirical 2014 advertising campaign for Taco Bell
- Ronald Carroll McDonald (1926–2011), child rapist
- Ronald MacDonald (athlete) (1874–1947), marathon runner, also spelled McDonald

== See also ==
- Ronald MacDonald (disambiguation)
- Donald McDonald (disambiguation)
- Donald MacDonald (disambiguation)
- Ranald MacDonald (disambiguation)
