= Donald MacDonald =

Donald MacDonald or Donald Macdonald may refer to:

== Military personnel ==
- Donald MacDonald (army officer) (c. 1724 – 1760), Scottish military officer who saw service for France, Charles Edward Stuart, and Great Britain
- Donald Alexander Macdonald (1817–1896), Canadian politician and lieutenant governor of Ontario
- Donald Alexander Macdonald (general) (1845–1920), Canadian general
- Donald Balloch MacDonald (died c. 1476), Scottish-Gaelic lord

== Politicians ==
- Donald MacDonald (Alberta politician) or Don MacDonald (fl. 1992–1993), Canadian politician, member of the Alberta legislature
- Donald Macdonald (Australian politician) (1886–1962), Australian politician and Presbyterian minister
- Donald MacDonald (Nova Scotia politician) (1909–1986), Canadian politician, social democrat and trade unionist
- Donald MacDonald (Saskatchewan politician, born 1886) (1886–1970)
- Donald A. MacDonald (c. 1849 –1884), Canadian farmer, member of the Prince Edward Island legislature
- Donald Alexander Macdonald (1817–1896), Canadian politician and lieutenant governor of Ontario
- Donald C. MacDonald (1913–2008), Canadian politician, leader of the Ontario New Democratic Party and the Ontario Co-operative Commonwealth Federation
- Donald Forrest MacDonald (born 1937), politician in Saskatchewan, Canada
- Donald Stovel Macdonald (1932–2018), Canadian politician and cabinet minister in the government of Pierre Trudeau

== Others ==
- Donald MacDonald (actor) (1886–1972), American film actor and film director
- Donald Macdonald (minister) (1825–1901), founding minister of the Free Presbyterian Church of Scotland
  - Donald MacDonald (preacher) (1825–1901), Scottish preacher
- Donald MacDonald (pastoralist) (1857–1937), Australian pastoralist
- Donald MacDonald (poet) or Dòmhnall Ruadh Chorùna (1887–1967), North Uist stonemason and war poet in the Scottish Gaelic language
- Donald Macdonald (rugby league) or Don Macdonald (died 1994), Australian rugby league referee
- Donald MacDonald (rugby union) (born 1951), Scottish rugby player
- Donald MacDonald (stained glass) (1841–1916), American stained glass artist
- Donald Alaster Macdonald (1859–1932), Australian sports journalist and war correspondent
- Donald Gorm MacDonald of Carey (died 1586)
- Sir Donald Gorme Og Macdonald, 1st Baronet (died 1643)
- Donald Stone Macdonald (1919–1993), American academic who specialized in Korean studies

== See also ==
- Donald McDonald (disambiguation)
