= Joseph Winniett =

Canadian politician

Joseph Winniett (1726–1789) was a public official, judge and political figure in Nova Scotia. He was the first Acadian elected to the Nova Scotia House of Assembly. He represented Annapolis Township from 1761 to 1765 and Annapolis County from 1765 to 1770 in the Nova Scotia House of Assembly.

He was born in Annapolis, Nova Scotia, the son of William Winniett and Acadian Marie-Madeleine Maisonnat. He was the grandson of Baptiste and the brother-in-law to Edward How. was a justice of the peace, a collector of customs and excise duties, a judge of probates and wills and a registrar of deeds. He married Mary Dyson in 1751. His sister Elizabeth married the commander at Fort Anne, John Handfield. He traded illegally with the French. In 1762, he was named a justice in the Inferior Court of Common Pleas.

His grandson William Robert Wolseley Winniett served as governor for the British Gold Coast colony.

== See also ==
- Military history of the Acadians
