= Fort Edward (Nova Scotia) =

National Historic Site of Canada

Coordinates: 44.996397°N 64.1354°W

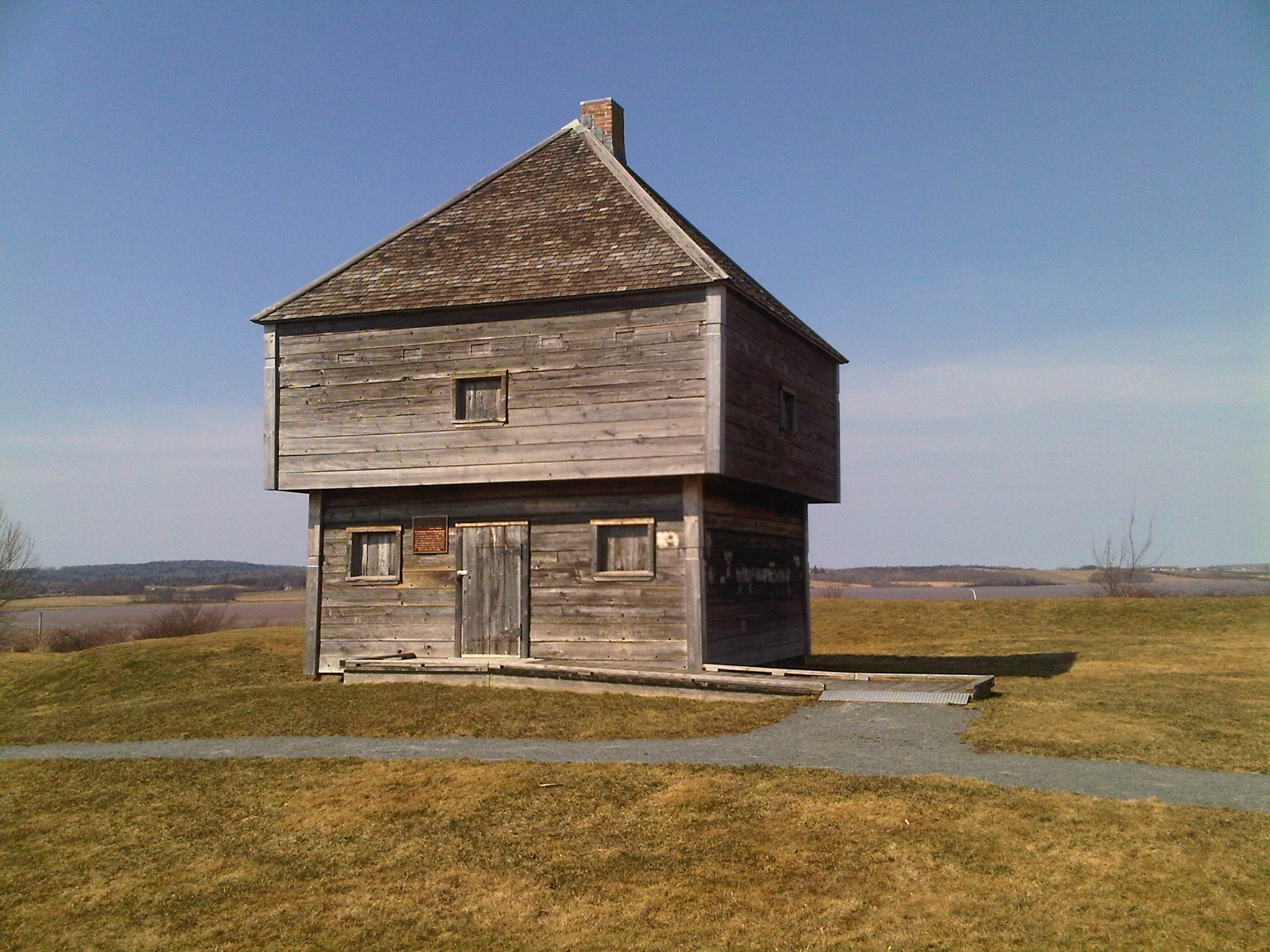
- Established: 1750
- Location: Windsor, Nova Scotia, Canada
- Type: National Historic Site
- Website: Fort Edward National Historic Site

National Historic Site of Canada
- Official name: Fort Edward National Historic Site of Canada
- Designated: 1920

Fort Edward is a National Historic Site of Canada in Windsor, Nova Scotia, (formerly known as Pisiguit) and was built during Father Le Loutre's War (1749–1755). The British built the fort to help prevent the Acadian Exodus from the region. The Fort is most famous for the role it played both in the Expulsion of the Acadians (1755) and in protecting Halifax, Nova Scotia from a land assault in the American Revolution. While much of Fort Edward has been destroyed, including the officers' quarters (which burned down in 1922) and barracks, the blockhouse that remains is the oldest extant in North America. A cairn was later added to the site.

== Father Le Loutre's War ==
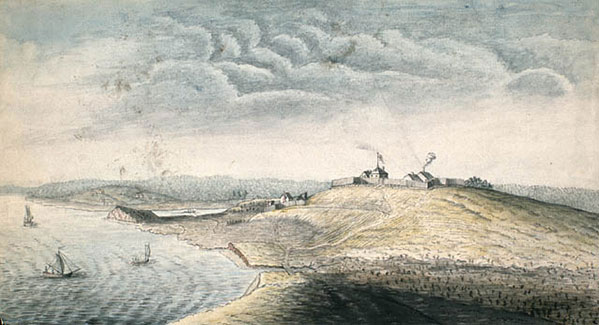
Fort Edward by Capt. John Hamilton (1753)

Despite the British Conquest of Acadia in 1710, Nova Scotia remained primarily occupied by ethnic French Catholic Acadians and Mi'kmaq. Father Le Loutre's War began when Edward Cornwallis arrived with 13 transports on 21 June 1749 to establish Halifax. To guard against Mi'kmaq, Acadian, and French attacks on the new British Protestant settlements, the latter erected fortifications in Halifax (1749), Bedford (Fort Sackville) (1749), Dartmouth (1750), Lunenburg (1753), and Lawrencetown (1754).

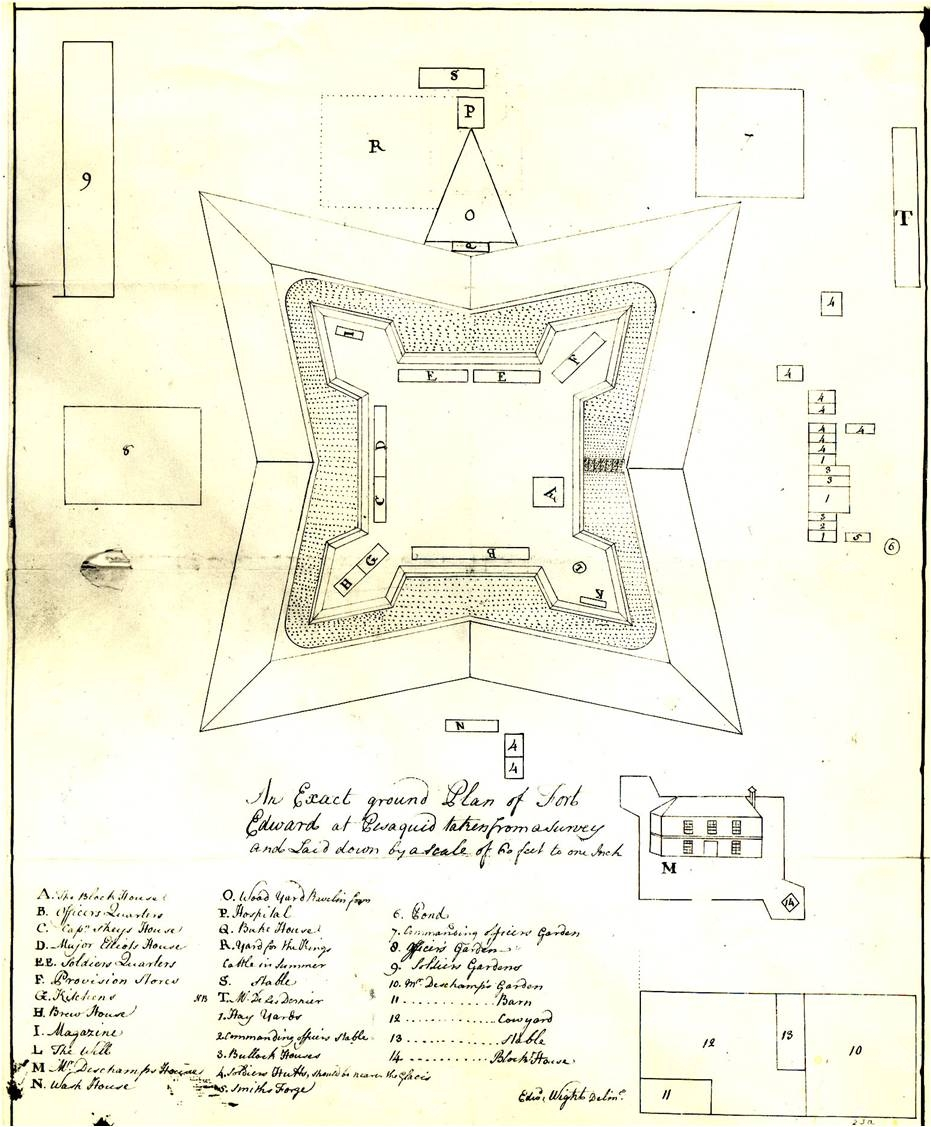
Map of Fort Edward 1757 (the remaining blockhouse is located within the walls of the fort and is marked with an "A")

Within 18 months of establishing Halifax, the British took firm control of peninsular Nova Scotia by building fortifications in all the major Acadian communities: present-day Windsor (Fort Edward); Grand Pre (Fort Vieux Logis) and Chignecto (Fort Lawrence). (A British fort - Fort Anne - already existed at the other major Acadian centre of Annapolis Royal, Nova Scotia. Cobequid was not fortified.)

Fort Edward was the site of the Acadian church for the parish of l'Assomption (established 1722). After initially failing to take the settlements of Chignecto, Major Charles Lawrence, on 7 June 1750, he had Acadians destroy their church so that Fort Edward could be built in its place. In early March 1750, the Acadians and Mi'kmaq took three English prisoners. Gorham was ordered to Fort Edward. On Gorham's march to Pisiquid to secure the area prior to building Fort Edward, the Rangers engaged the Mi'kmaq in the Battle at St. Croix (1750).

The Fort was named by Gorham for Edward Cornwallis, who established Halifax, Nova Scotia.

On 9 May 1750, Phillips was fired on by French and Native. Capt. John Rous was in a skirmish off Fort Edward at the same time, where he killed two native people, whose comrades took their bodies.

At first Alexander Murray commanded at Fort Sackville. In September 1751 he was given command of Fort Edward, where he remained for most of the ensuing seven years, except for a tour of duty at Halifax in 1753. On 12 December 1752, Murray was charged by the Nova Scotia Council with exploiting the local Acadian community by paying unfair prices for supplies and randomly imprisoning some of the men.

On 1 November 1753, Captain Hale was relieved by Commander Floyer as the commander of Fort Edward.

Fort Edward, Fort Lawrence, and Fort Anne were all supplied by and dependent on the arrival of Captains Cobb, Jeremiah Rogers or John Taggart, in one of the government sloops. These vessels took the annual or semi-annual relief to their destination. They carried the officers and their families to and from, as required.

== French and Indian War ==
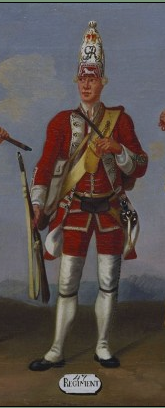
47th Regiment of Foot by David Morier, 1751

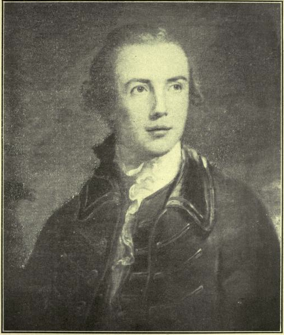
Captain Alexander Murray

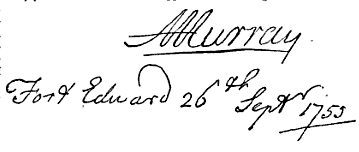
Signature of Alexander Murray, Fort Edward, Nova Scotia

Fort Edward played an important role in the Bay of Fundy Campaign (1755) of the Acadian Expulsion. Shortly after the Battle of Fort Beauséjour on the eve of the Expulsion, the commander at Fort Edward Captain Alexander Murray wrote his wife saying, the Acadians "are in as great anxiety as I am about their fate". A month later, at exactly the same time as Lieutenant Colonel John Winslow read the expulsion orders in Grand Pré; 5 September at 15:00 hrs, Captain Murray read the order to the 183 Acadian males he had imprisoned at Fort Edward. On 20 October 920 Acadians from Pisiquid were loaded on to four transports. Unlike at the neighbouring community of Grand Pré, the English did not burn and destroy the buildings at Pisiquid. As a result, when the New England Planters arrived, many houses and barns were available for use. (Note: Faragher (2005), pp. 361–362, gives duration of period Acadians initially held at Fort Edward (Sept 5 - 20 Oct). Also see Regis Burn. The Acadians before 1755, p.31. Burn mentions that - Murray order the Acadians to Fort Edward (as Winslow did of the Acadians at Grand Pre), 183 men and boys heed the call and are at Fort Edward on Sept 5, 1755; Also see Peter Landry. The Lion and the Lily. Trafford Press. 2007. p. 519) Fort Edward was one of four forts in which Acadians were imprisoned over the nine years of the expulsion (the others were Fort Frederick, Saint John, New Brunswick; Fort Cumberland; and Fort Charlotte, Georges Island, Halifax). On average, over a period of nine years, 350 Acadian prisoners at a time were held at the garrison.

=== Raids on Fort Edward ===
Both the Acadians and Mi'kmaq resisted the Expulsion. In September 1756, a group of 100 Acadians ambushed a party of thirteen soldiers of the 47th Regiment of Foot who were working outside the fort. They took seven men prisoner, and six escaped back to the fort.

In April 1757, a band of Acadian and Mi'kmaq partisans raided a warehouse near Fort Edward, killing thirteen British soldiers. After taking what provisions they could carry, they set fire to the building. A few days later, the same partisans raided Fort Cumberland. Because of the strength of the Acadian militia and Mi'kmaq militia, British officer John Knox wrote that "In the year 1757 we were said to be Masters of the province of Nova Scotia, or Acadia, which, however, was only an imaginary possession." He said that the situation in the province was so precarious for the British that the "troops and inhabitants" at Fort Edward, Fort Sackville and Lunenburg "could not be reputed in any other light than as prisoners."

In the early 1760s it was illegal for Acadians to reside in Nova Scotia; families and individuals who had avoided capture in 1755 were imprisoned. The prison lists for Fort Edward between 1761 and 1762 still exist (For a list of the prisoners see List of Acadian Prisoners - Fort Edward). In 1762, one of the most famous prisoners, Acadian Joseph Broussard (Beausoleil) was imprisoned here. Between June 1763 and 1764, in the Minas region, the British authorities took 363 Acadians into custody at Fort Edward.

While prisoners, the Acadians were forced to work for the New England Planters to establish their farmlands. When the war finished, rather than stay and work as subordinates, the Acadians settled with their compatriots in present-day New Brunswick and Saint Pierre and Miquelon.

=== Notable prisoners ===
- Acadian Joseph Broussard
- Father Henri Daudin
- Father Jacques Girard

=== Commanders ===
- Captain John Gorham (Gorham's Rangers (1750)
- Captain William Phipps, Commander of Fort Edward, died c. Feb. 1751. Eldest son of Acting Governor of Massachusetts Spencer Phips
- Capt George St. Loe (military officer) (40th) (1751)
- Capt. Patrick Sutherland, (45th Regiment) (1751)
- Capt John Hale (47th) (1753)
- Capt Matthew Floyer, 1 Nov. (1753–54)
- Nicholas Cox (47th), (1754–56)
- Capt. Alexander Murray, (1754–55)
- Capt Murray, Capt. Cox, on 5 December 1755, they were reinforced by Capt. William Lampson's and Capt Silvanus Cobb's companies of the first battalion of Governor Shirley's Massachusetts regiment (which was led by John Winslow)
- Capt. Cox, Capt. Lampson, Capt. Cobb (1756)
- Colonel Quintin Kennedy, regiment, under Lord Loudon, (Aug., 1757.)
- Capt Daniel Fletcher (military officer) of Col Joseph Frye's Massachusetts regiment (1758–59).
- Capt Jotham Gay of Col. John Thomas' Massachusetts regiment (1759–1760)
- Capt. Edmund Wetmough (1760)
- Capt Jotham Gay of Col. Nathanial Thwing (Nathan) (1759–60), 14 May 1760, to 10 Jan. 1761.

==== Gallery ====
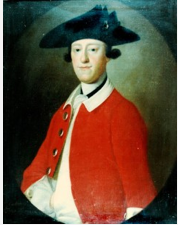
Captain John Hale, 47th Foot

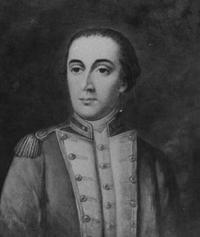
Captain Nicholas Cox - longest serving commander

== American Revolution ==
During the American Revolution the 84th Regiment of Foot (Royal Highland Emigrants), 2nd Battalion were stationed at Forts throughout Atlantic Canada. Fort Edward was the headquarters for the 84th Regiment in Atlantic Canada. The 84th Regiment moved from Halifax to Fort Edward to guard against a land assault on Halifax. Throughout the war, Fort Edward housed prisoners taken from American Privateering ships.

The Jacobite heroine Flora MacDonald spent the winter of 1778 - 1779 at the Fort with her husband, Alan Macdonald, before she returned alone to Scotland.

== War of 1812 ==
Fort Edward was also active during the War of 1812. During this time, the Fort continued to protect Nova Scotia against assault by American Privateers.

Fort Edward remained part of the British defenses in Nova Scotia until 1858.

== World War I ==
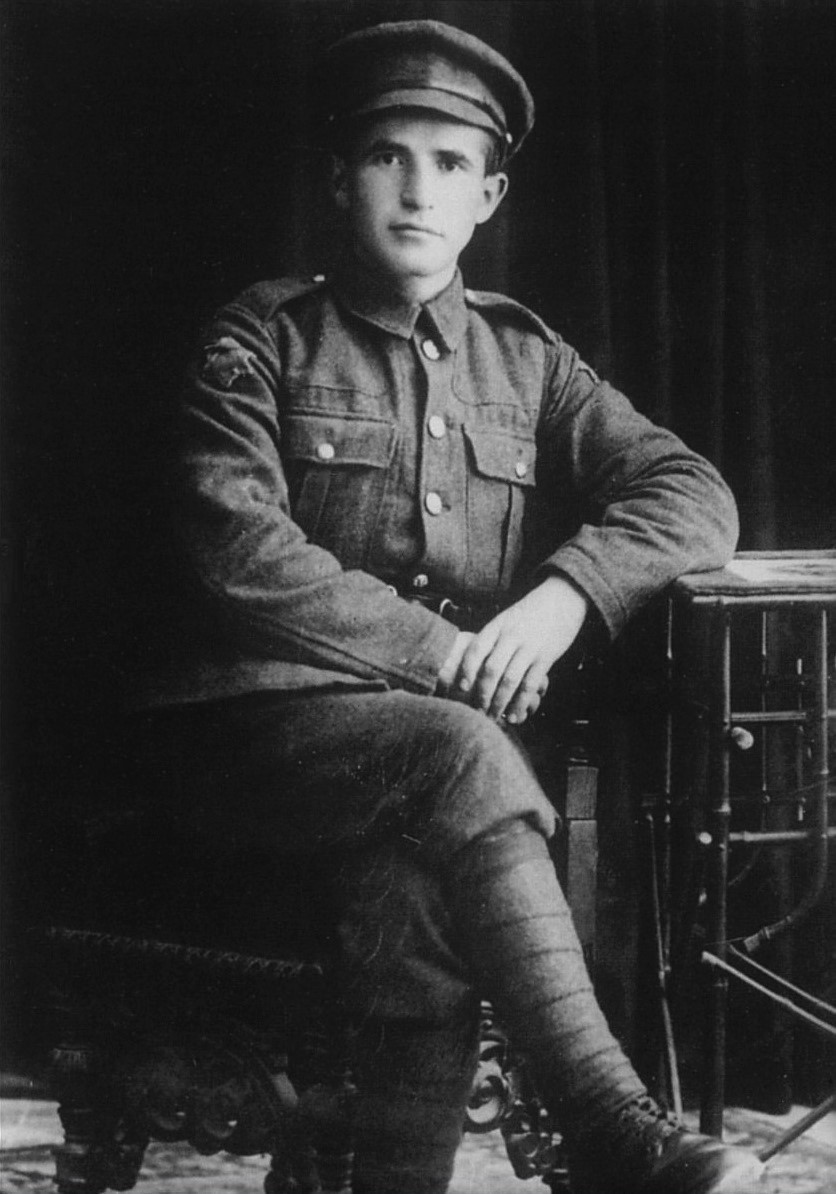
David Ben-Gurion, future prime minister of Israel, in his Jewish Legion uniform, 1918

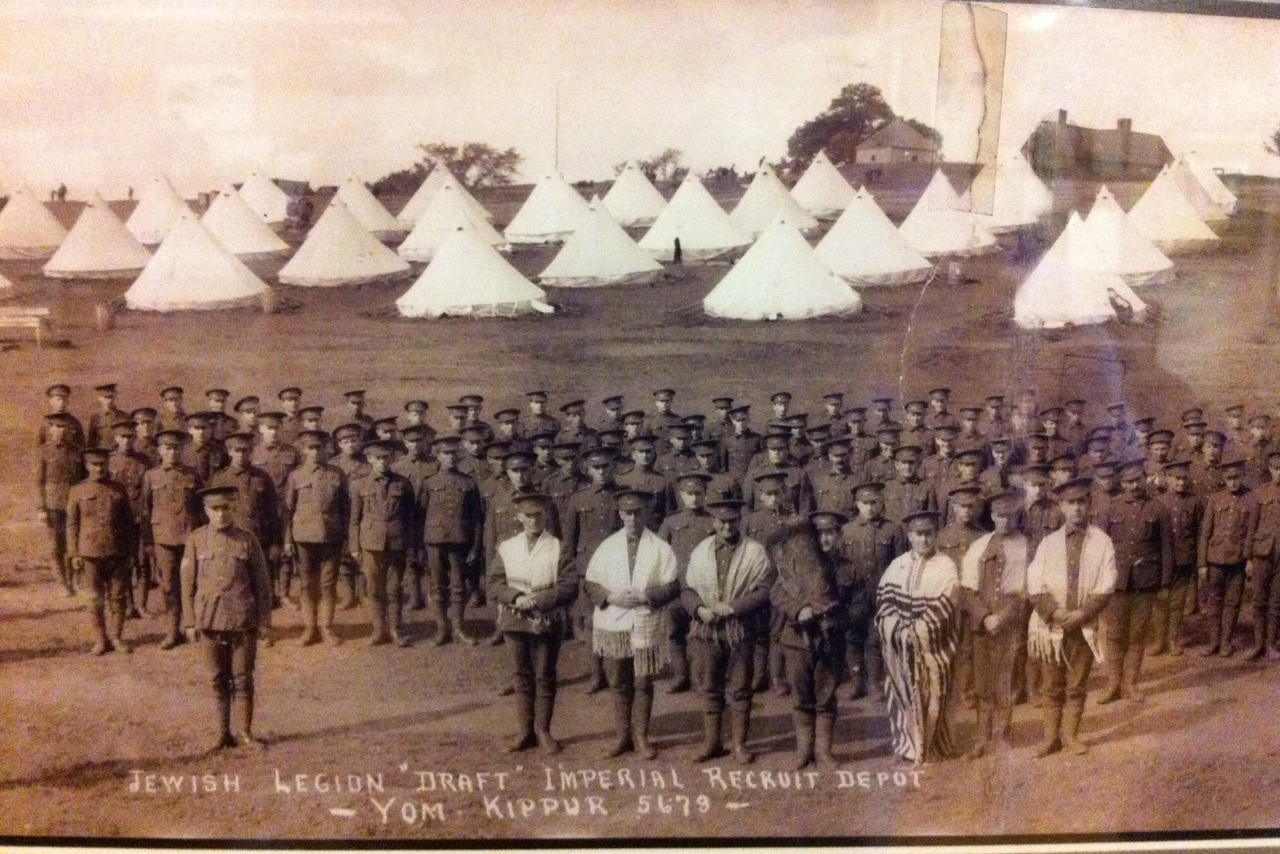
Jewish Legion, Fort Edward, Nova Scotia (Yom Kippur, 1918) - Inset (Whole Image here)

During World War I, it was utilized as a training depot for Canadian and British soldiers. The site became known informally as "Camp Fort Edward" for the duration of the war. Among the recruits passing through the camp was the ill-fated Hollywood film director William Desmond Taylor.

During World War I the British Army used the fort to establish a training depot for Jewish men training to fight against the Ottoman Turks in Palestine and ultimately help Great Britain, France and America defeat Germany. Known as The Jewish Legion, this unit, was "stood up" for service in 1917 manned by Jews from around the world who came to Windsor for training on the slopes of the fort with Major W.F.D Bremner. The Legion was made up of Battalions 38–42. At Fort Edward was the 39th Battalion, 1100 Jewish troops led by Lt Colonel Eliezer Margolin. Bremner lived in Castle Fredericks and is an ancestor of Falmouth's James J. Bremner (See Halifax Provisional Battalion). Pictures and first-hand accounts of the time indicate that the men lived in tents on the hillside below the blockhouse.

Many of these recruits came with Zionist ideals and dreams of a restored Palestinian homeland for the Jews. In Windsor, Nova Scotia 1100 non-commissioned officers were trained. Founders of the legion included David Ben-Gurion, who became the first prime minister of Israel, and Ze'ev Jabotinsky, both men were trained at Fort Edward. At age 70, David Ben-Gurion reported on his time at Fort Edward: "I will never forget Windsor where I received my first training as a soldier and where I became a corporal."

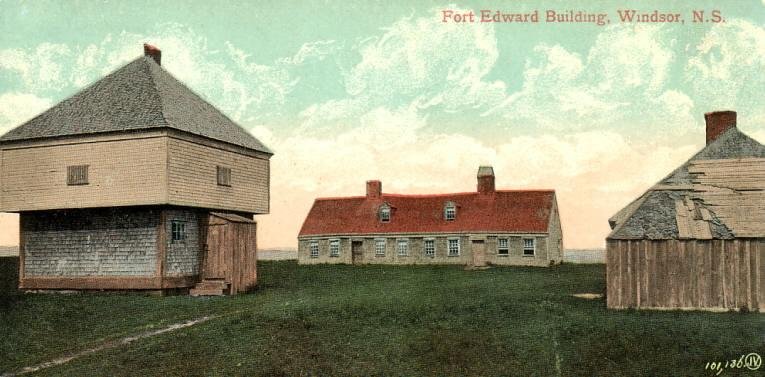
Fort Edward c. 1900

== Fort Edward National Historic Site ==
The fort was designated a National Historic Site in 1920. The blockhouse was additionally designated a Classified Federal Heritage Building in 1994.

== Windsor Agricultural Fair ==
The Windsor Agricultural Fair is the oldest continuous agricultural fair in North America, beginning with the first generation of New England Planters at Fort Edward (1765).

== See also ==
- List of oldest buildings in Canada
- List of historic places in Hants County, Nova Scotia
- Military history of Nova Scotia
- Military history of the Mi'kmaq people
- Military history of the Acadians
