= Governor Hamilton =

Governor Hamilton may refer to:

- Andrew Hamilton (New Jersey governor) (died 1703), Colonial Governor of East and West New Jersey from 1692 to 1697 and from 1699 to 1703
- Andrew Jackson Hamilton (1815–1875), 11th Governor of Texas
- Lord Archibald Hamilton (1673–1754), Governor of Jamaica from 1711 to 1716
- George Hamilton, 1st Earl of Orkney (1666–1737), Colonial Governor of Virginia from 1698 to 1737 and Governor of Edinburgh Castle from 1714 to 1737
- Henry Hamilton (colonial administrator) (1734–1796), Governor of Bermuda from 1785 to 1794 and Governor of Dominica from 1794 to 1796
- James Hamilton (Pennsylvania politician) (1710–1783), Deputy Governor of the Province of Pennsylvania from 1748 to 1754 and from 1759 to 1763
- James Hamilton Jr. (1786–1857), 53rd Governor of South Carolina
- John Hamilton (New Jersey politician) (1680s–1747), Acting Governor of the Province of New Jersey from 1736 to 1738 and from 1746 to 1747
- John Marshall Hamilton (1847–1905), 18th Governor of Illinois
- Otho Hamilton (died 1770), Governor of Placentia from 1744 to 1764
- Paul Hamilton (politician) (1762–1816), 42nd Governor of South Carolina (including colonial governors; 15th for the state)
- William Gerard Hamilton (1729–1796), English statesman and Irish politician
- William T. Hamilton (1820–1888), 38th Governor of Maryland
