= John Handfield =

British military officer (c.1693–1787)

John Handfield (c. 1693 – 1787) was a British military officer, member of the Nova Scotia Council, and office holder.

Handfield was commissioned in Philipps' Regiment (the 40th Regiment of Foot) as an ensign in 1720, taking up his duties at Annapolis Royal, Nova Scotia. Promoted to lieutenant in 1731 and received promotions to lieutenant-captain (1739), captain (1740), major (1754), and lieutenant-colonel (1758). Appointed to the Nova Scotia Council at Annapolis Royal in 1736 and granted the position of justice of the peace by Governor Peregrine Hopson in 1752.

During Father Le Loutre's War, Captain Handfield was first in command of Fort Vieux Logis (1749), successfully defending the fort during the Siege of Grand Pre, while losing his son and future son-in-law Captain John Hamilton, who were taken prisoner by the Mi'kmaq and Acadian militias.

In 1750 he was commander at Fort Anne, Annapolis Royal.

He took command at Fort Lawrence, where he married John Hamilton (British army officer) to his daughter (1752). Through his marriage to Acadian Elizabeth Winniet (sister of Joseph Winniett, both of whom were grandchildren of Pierre Maisonnat dit Baptiste), John was related to many Acadians and thus found carrying out his duties to deport the Acadians at Annapolis disagreeable. In a letter to John Winslow he states, "I heartily join with You in wishing that we were both of us got over this most disagreeable and troublesome part of the Service."

In 1758 he fought at the Siege of Louisbourg, retiring from His Majesty's service in 1760. He moved to Boston upon his retirement and by 1776 was found in Ireland, where he died at Waterford on April 20, 1787.
