= John Hamilton (British Army officer) =

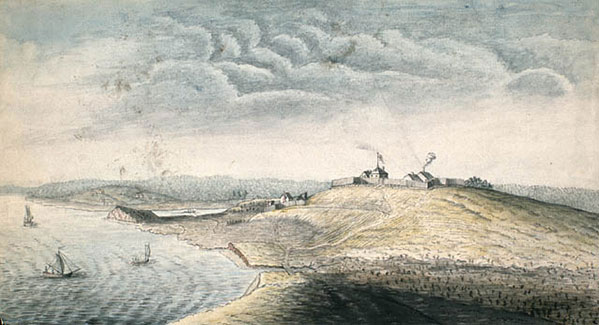
Fort Edward by Capt. Hamilton (1753)

John Hamilton (1724 in Annapolis Royal – 1802 in Waterford, Ireland) was a British army officer of the 40th Regiment of Foot who fought in both King George's War and Father Le Loutre's War. He was eventually captured by a Mi'kmaq militia. He was an important prize for the Mi'kmaq because of his connections with the Nova Scotia establishment, his father and father-in-law being members of the Nova Scotia Council. He was also an artist and attempted to negotiate peace between the Mi'kmaq and British.

== Military ==
He participated in the Siege of Annapolis Royal (1745) during King George's War. He applied for compensation when his property was destroyed in the defence of the town.

He was taken prisoner at the Siege of Grand Pre during Father Le Loutre's War in Nova Scotia (1750). The Mi'kmaq militia captured Lieutenant John Hamilton and eighteen soldiers under his command (including British officer John Handfield's son), while surveying the fort's environs. He was imprisoned in Quebec for two years before he was able to negotiate for the freedom of himself and 60 other prisoners. He was helped to gain his release by both his father Otho Hamilton and his father-in-law William Shirriff, both of whom were members of the Nova Scotia Council. Jean-Louis Le Loutre had paid Mi'kmaq ransom for Hamilton's release. He also was traded for the daughter of an Indian chief that John Gorham had imprisoned in Boston at his own residence with his daughter. Upon his return he married his second wife, daughter of his commander John Handfield.

In 1767, he went with the 40th Regiment to Ireland.

== Family ==
His second wife Mary Handfield died in 1773. Captain John Hamilton then married his third wife Ann Moore in Waterford, Ireland in 1777. They had a son John, born in 1779, who married Hannah Taylor in Waterford, Ireland.

== Peace Proposal (1754) ==
In 1754–55, Hamilton was supportive of Le Loutre and Chief Paul Laurent trying to negotiate a peace with the British.

Hamilton's first wife whom he married in 1741 was Martha Shirreff Hamilton, daughter of member of the Nova Scotia Council William Shirreff, and died in 1751. He remarried at Fort Lawrence by his former commander at Grand Pre. He married commander John Handfield's daughter Miss Mary Handfield (1752).

== Artist ==
He was also an artist and created important images of four forts during the war.

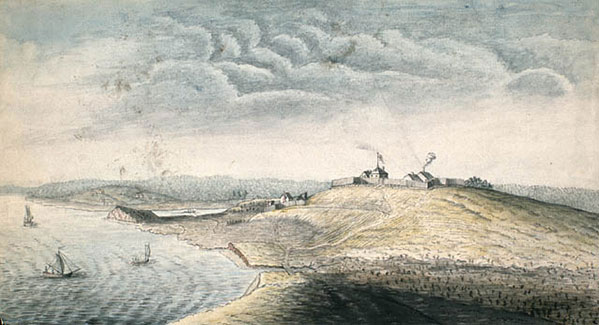
Fort Edward by Capt. Hamilton (1753)

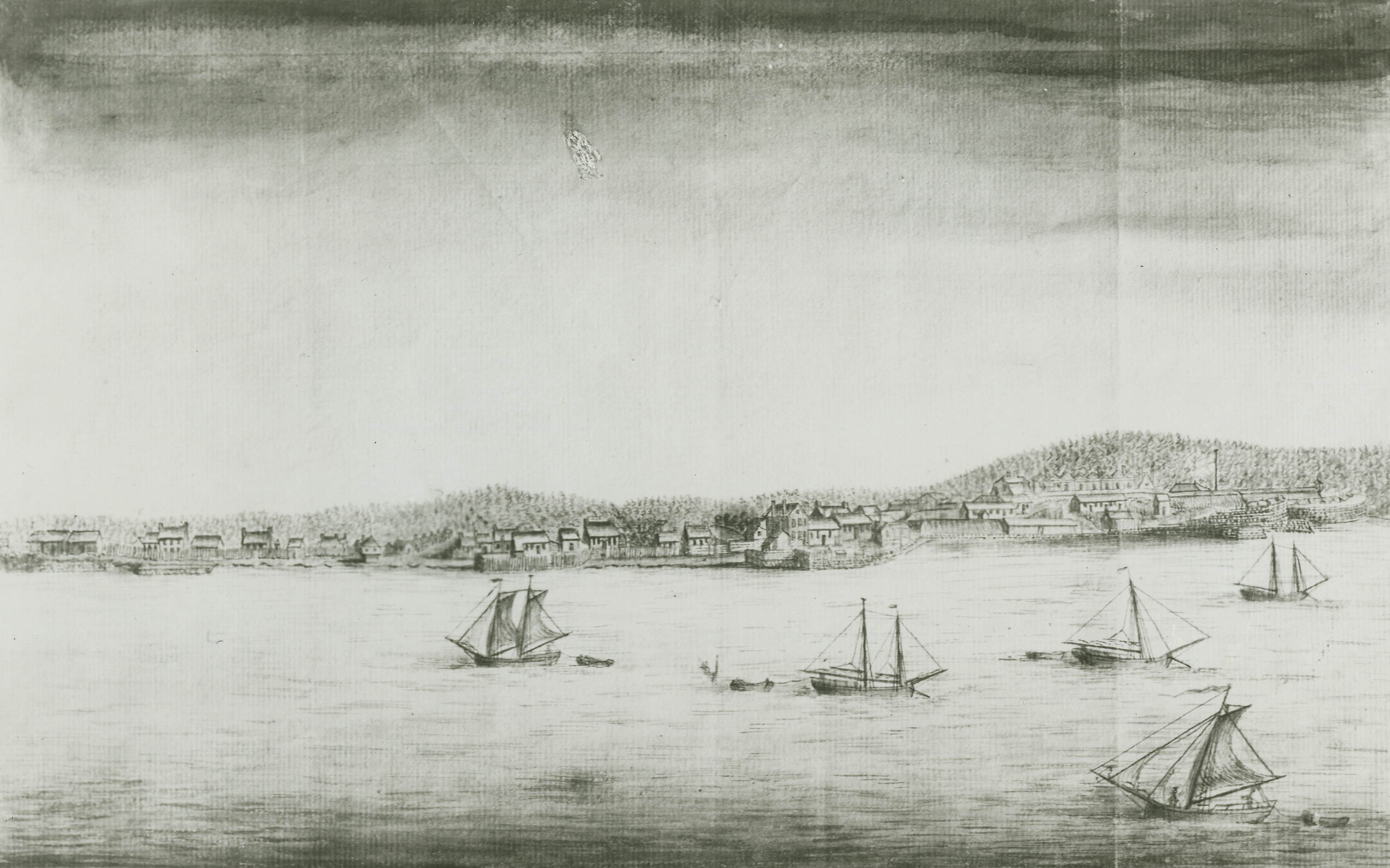
Fort Anne, Annapolis Royal by Hamilton (c. 1753)

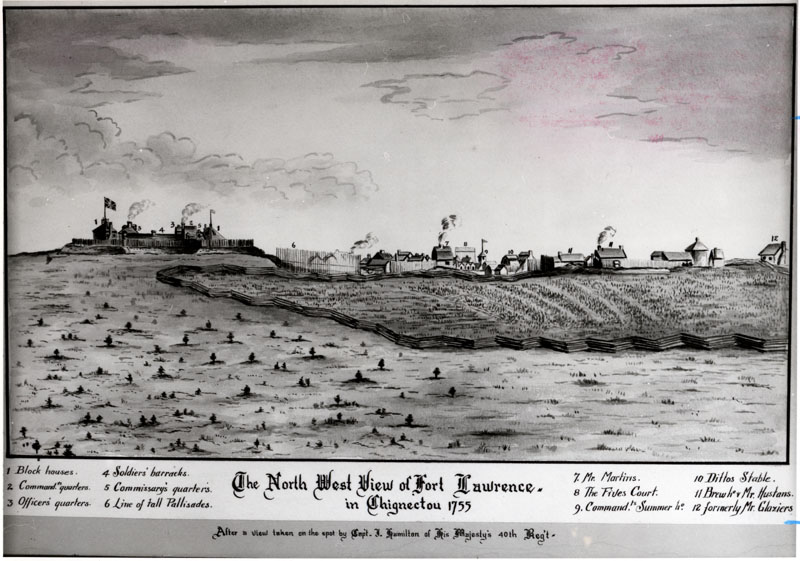
Fort Lawrence by John Hamilton (1755)

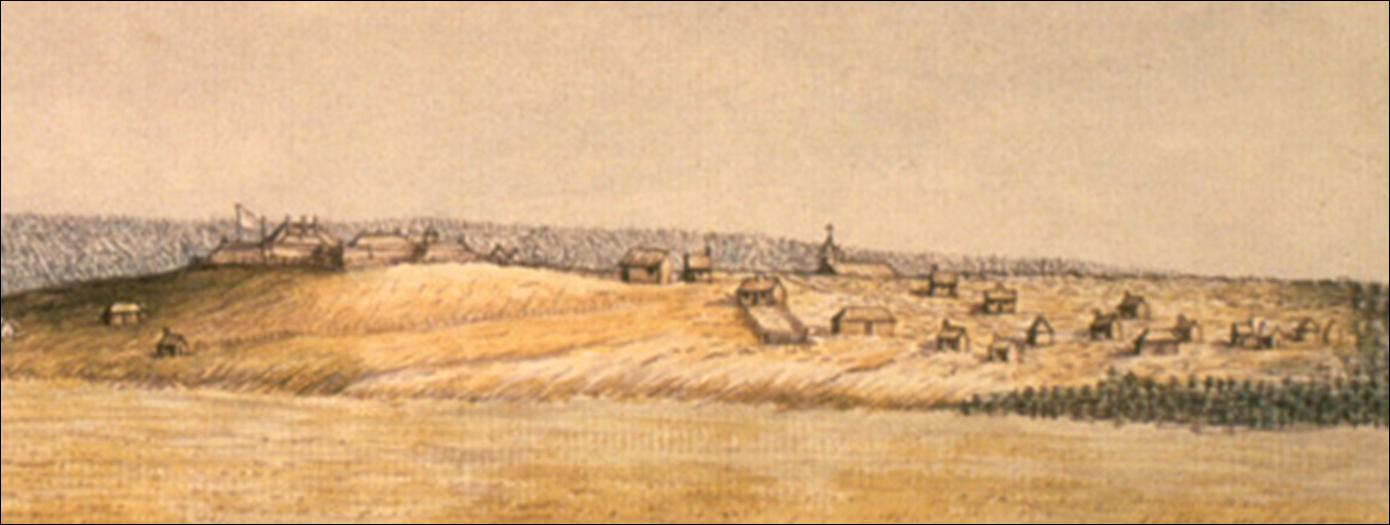
Fort Beauséjour and Le Loutre's Cathedral (1755)

== See also ==
- Captivity Narratives - Nova Scotia
