= Nicholas Cox (British Army officer) =

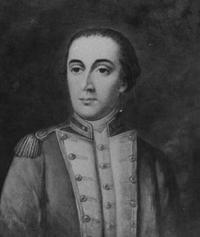
- Born: 1724; Dunmanway, Ireland
- Died: January 8, 1794 (aged 69–70); Quebec City
- Burial place: Holy Trinity Cathedral, Quebec City
- Spouse: Deborah Wickham
- Military career
- Allegiance: British

Nicholas Cox (1724–1794) was a British military officer in Nova Scotia and later Lt. Governor of the Gaspesie. During Father Le Loutre's War, Cox was under the command of Col. Peregrine Lascelles and Lt. Col Robert Monckton of the 47th Regiment of Foot. Cox served as commander at Fort Vieux Logis, after the Siege of Grand Pre and later at Fort Edward, participating in the Bay of Fundy Campaign (1755). He became a captain on 2 July 1753 and was the longest serving Captain at Fort Edward. He also was at the Battle of Fort Beausejour and the Siege of Louisbourg (1758).

In 1789, Cox was appointed lieutenant-governor of the Gaspé District by Governor Guy Carleton, and had his home in New Carlisle.

In 1842, the geographic township around New Carlisle was named after him, which became the Township Municipality of Cox in 1845. It was dissolved in 1877 when it was divided into the Municipalities of New Carlisle and Paspébiac.
