= Fort Lawrence (Nova Scotia) =

British fort

Coordinates: 45.852°N 64.260°W

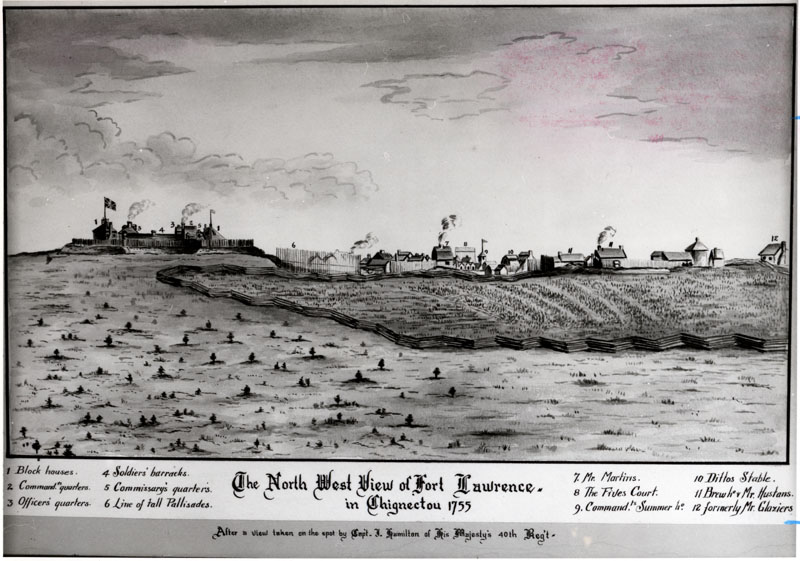
Fort Lawrence by John Hamilton (1755)

Fort Lawrence was a British fort built during Father Le Loutre's War and located on the Isthmus of Chignecto (in the modern-day community of Fort Lawrence).

== Father Le Loutre's War ==
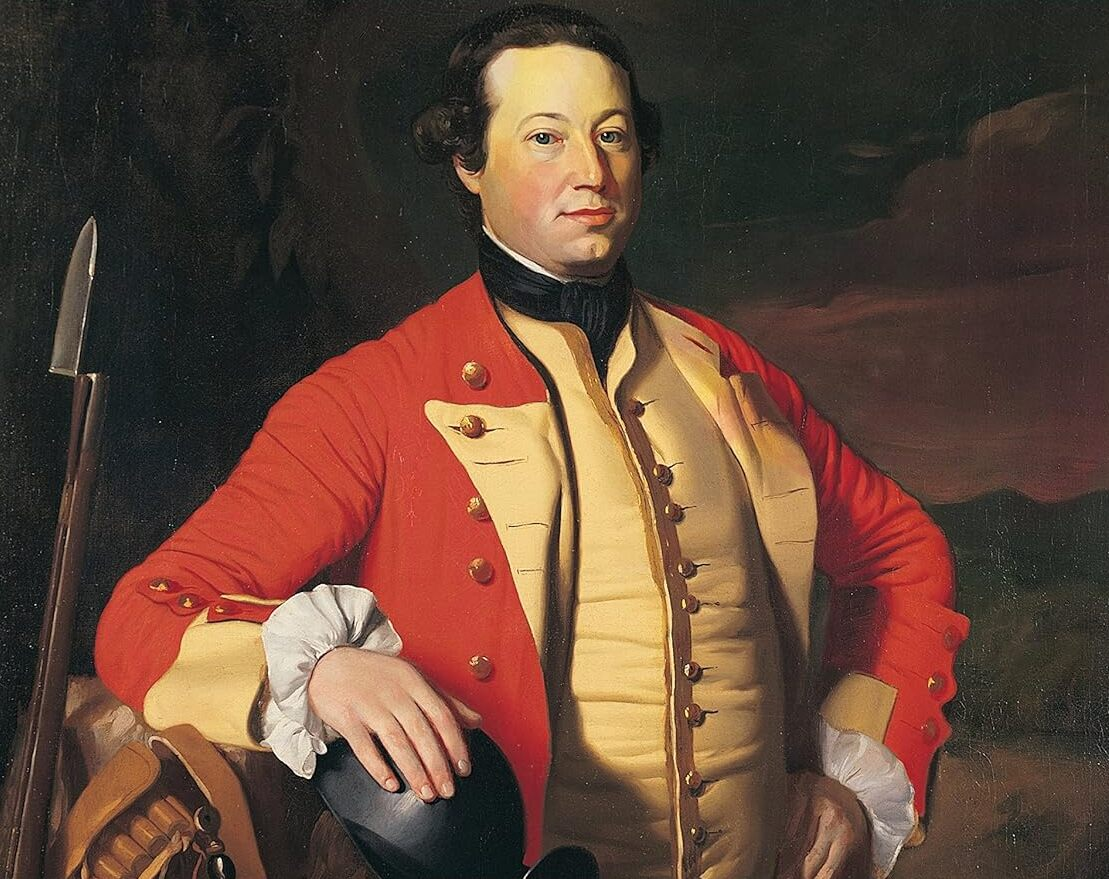
Captain George Scott by John Singleton Copley (c.1758), The Brook

Despite the British Conquest of Acadia in 1710, Nova Scotia remained primarily occupied by Catholic Acadians and Mi'kmaq. Father Le Loutre's War began after Edward Cornwallis arrived to establish Halifax with 13 transports on June 21, 1749. The British quickly began to build other settlements. To guard against Mi'kmaq, Acadian and French attacks on the new Protestant settlements, British fortifications were erected in Halifax (1749), Bedford (Fort Sackville) (1749), Dartmouth (1750), Lunenburg (1753), and Lawrencetown (1754).

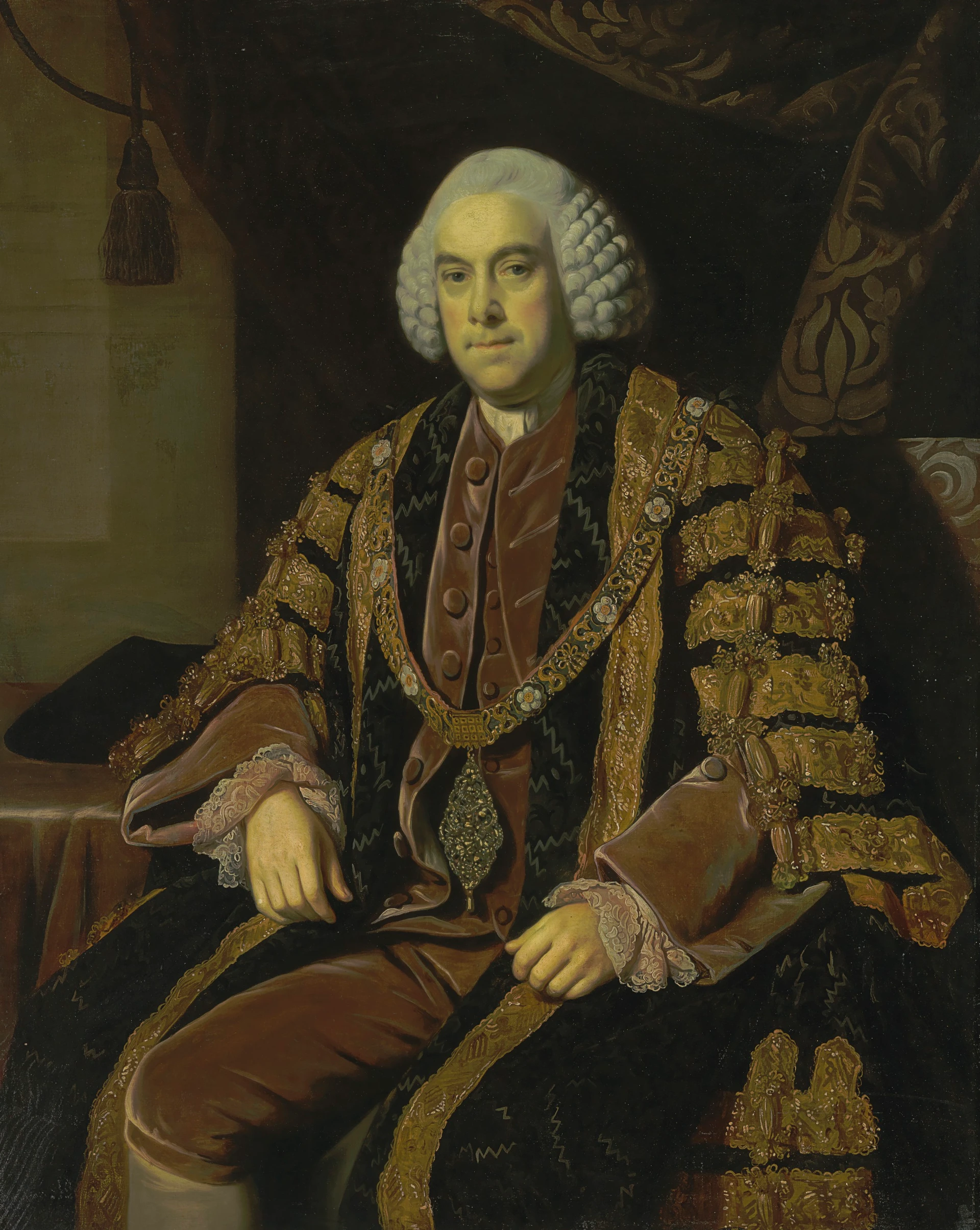
Brook Watson served at Fort Lawrence (1750-1759)

Within 18 months of establishing Halifax, the British also took firm control of peninsula Nova Scotia by building fortifications in all the major Acadian communities: present-day Windsor (Fort Edward); Grand-Pré (Fort Vieux Logis) and Chignecto (Fort Lawrence). A British fort (Fort Anne) already existed at the other major Acadian centre of Annapolis Royal, Nova Scotia. Cobequid remained without a fort.

In the spring of 1750, a British Army expeditionary force under Major Charles Lawrence arrived at Beaubassin. The village was ordered burnt by the French priest Jean-Louis Le Loutre to ensure that the British could not profit from its seizure. The British forces soon found they were outnumbered by Acadians and Mi'kmaq. Lawrence's troops retreated but returned in September 1750 in greater numbers and engaged in the Battle at Chignecto.

After Le Loutre's militia retreated, Lawrence began to build Fort Lawrence, a palisade fort on a ridge immediately east of the Missaguash River, the disputed border between Acadia and Nova Scotia since the Treaty of Utrecht was signed, and within sight of Fort Beausejour. The structure was completed under the command of Captain John Handfield. 16 September 1750, the natives killed two soldiers and 11 rangers went missing. Two days later, natives took the ship Fair Lady with 5 crew on board. On October 4, Howe was killed. Oct. 11 Mangers schooner taken and burned. November 17, natives take five prisoners in front of the fort. Nov. 23, natives fired on cattle. Nov. 30, natives attacked a wood party, wounding three.

On August 15, 1752, Lt. Col. Robert Monckton took command of Fort Lawrence.

In 1753, Captain George Scott took command of the fort and in May, warriors scalped two British soldiers. Scott made contact with the spy Thomas Pichon. Scott relinquished command of Fort Lawrence in the autumn of 1754 and Captain John Hussey took over command. Preparations were then being made for an attack on Beauséjour, and he was appointed to command one of the two battalions of Massachusetts troops. He played a considerable part in the brief siege.

Fort Edward, Fort Lawrence, and Fort Anne were all supplied by and dependent on the arrival of Captains Cobb, Rogers or Taggart, in one of the government sloops. These vessels took the annual or semi-annual relief to their destination. They carried the officers and their families to and fro as required.

== French and Indian War ==
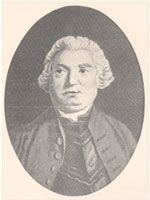
Charles Lawrence

=== Battle of Beausejour ===
The Battle of Fort Beausejour ended Father Le Loutre's War and began the French and Indian War in the region. On June 4, 1755 the British conquest for all of France's North American territory began when a force of British regulars and New England militia attacked Fort Beauséjour from Fort Lawrence under command of Lt. Col. Robert Monckton. The British-led force took control of Fort Beauséjour by June 16, 1755, after which they changed the name to Fort Cumberland.

=== Expulsion of the Acadians ===
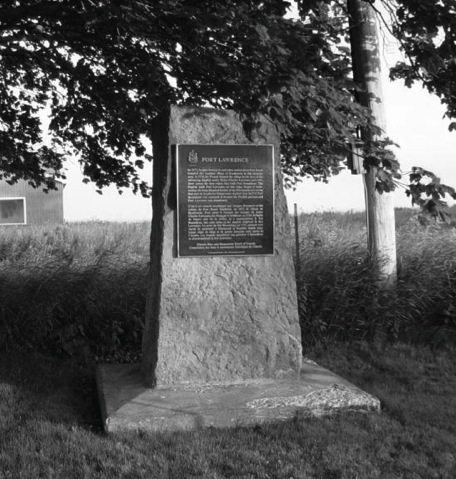
Fort Lawrence Plaque

In the ensuing months, British forces attempted to get Acadians living in the region to sign an oath of allegiance to the British Crown, however the Acadians refused, preferring to stay neutral. In August 1755, the British Expulsion of the Acadians began with the Bay of Fundy Campaign (1755). The order was given by Governor of Nova Scotia, Charles Lawrence, the same military officer who had presided over construction of Fort Lawrence in 1750. Along with Fort Beausejour, Fort Lawrence was also used to imprison male Acadians. The most famous Acadian held here was Joseph Broussard (Beausoleil). On October 1, 1755, the Acadian prisoners at Fort Lawrence escaped. Joseph Broussard was one of the escapees.

Acadian homes were burnt by British forces to prevent their return. As the British army was now using the more substantial facility at Fort Cumberland, British forces decided to demolish the abandoned works at Fort Lawrence to prevent the facility being used as shelter by Acadians who may have escaped to nearby forests. Fort Lawrence was razed by fire on October 12, 1756 only 6 years after its construction.

== Commanding officers ==
- Charles Lawrence (British Army officer)
- Major Southcott Hungerford Luttrell (45th)
- Thomas Collier (military officer), Lascelles (47th) regiment (d.1752)
- Robert Monckton (47th Regiment)
- George Scott (army officer) (1753-1754) (40th Regiment)
- John Hussey (47th Regiment)

== Fort Lawrence National Historic Site ==
The site containing the archaeological remains of Fort Lawrence was designated a National Historic Site of Canada in 1923.

Today the site of Fort Lawrence is a barren field behind a visitor information centre. Plans are in place for a full reconstruction of the fort, however funding from various levels of government has yet to be allocated. Various archaeological explorations from Fort Lawrence have netted numerous artifacts, some of which can be viewed at a display at Fort Beauséjour National Historic Site.

== See also ==
- Military history of Nova Scotia
