= Prescott (Province of Canada electoral district) =

Province of Canada electoral district

Prescott Canada West
Province of Canada electoral district

Defunct pre-Confederation electoral district
- Legislature: Legislative Assembly of the Province of Canada
- District created: 1841
- District abolished: 1867
- First contested: 1841
- Last contested: 1863

Prescott was an electoral district of the Legislative Assembly of the Parliament of the Province of Canada, in Canada West (now Ontario). It was created in 1841, upon the establishment of the Province of Canada by the union of Upper Canada and Lower Canada. Prescott was represented by one member in the Legislative Assembly. It was abolished in 1867, upon the creation of Canada and the province of Ontario.

== Boundaries ==
Prescott electoral district was based on Prescott County (now part of the United Counties of Prescott and Russell). It was located east of Bytown (now Ottawa, Ontario), on the Ottawa River, which formed the border with Canada East (now the province of Quebec).

The Union Act, 1840 had merged the two provinces of Upper Canada and Lower Canada into the Province of Canada, with a single Parliament. The separate parliaments of Lower Canada and Upper Canada were abolished. The Union Act provided that the pre-existing electoral boundaries of Upper Canada would continue to be used in the new Parliament, unless altered by the Union Act itself.

Prescott County had been an electoral district in the Legislative Assembly of Upper Canada, and its boundaries had not been altered by the Union Act. Those boundaries had originally been defined by a statute of Upper Canada in 1798:

That the townships of Hawkesbury, Longueil, with the tract of land in its rear, Alfred and Plantagenet, with such of the Islands in the Ottawa river as are wholly or in greater part opposite thereto, shall constitute and form the County of Prescott.

Since Prescott's boundaries were not changed by the Union Act, those boundaries continued to be used for the new electoral district. Prescott was represented by one member in the Legislative Assembly.

== Members of the Legislative Assembly ==
Prescott was represented by one member in the Legislative Assembly. The following were the members for Prescott.

Parliament	Years	Members	Party
1st Parliament; 1841–1844	1841–1844	Donald McDonald	Unionist; moderate Reformer

== Abolition ==
Prescott electoral district was abolished on July 1, 1867, when the British North America Act, 1867 came into force, creating Canada and splitting the Province of Canada into Quebec and Ontario. It was succeeded by the electoral districts of Prescott in both the House of Commons of Canada and the Legislative Assembly of Ontario.
