= John Knox (British Army officer) =

British Army officer, died 1778

Captain John Knox
- Died: 8 February 1778; Berwick-upon-Tweed
- Military career
- Allegiance: Kingdom of Great Britain
- Branch: British Army
- Rank: Captain
- Unit: 43rd Regiment of Foot
- Conflicts: War of the Austrian Succession; Battle of Lauffeld; French and Indian War; Battle of the Plains of Abraham; Battle of Sainte Foy; Siege of Quebec; Montreal Campaign

John Knox (died 8 February 1778) was an officer in the British Army who took part in the Austrian War of Succession and the Seven Years' War. He served in North America between 1757 and 1760 and is notable for providing historians with the most complete account of these campaigns. Knox narrowly avoided being killed in 1759 when a French soldier's musket twice misfired, and he went on to fight in the Battle of the Plains of Abraham, where he performed in one of the most devastating volleys in military history. Knox also took part in the Battle of Sainte Foy and was present when Montreal surrendered on 8 September 1760.

== Early life ==
Very little is known about his early life. He was born in Ireland, the third son of a Sligo merchant, and served as a volunteer in the British Army before distinguishing himself at the Battle of Lauffeld in 1747. Consequently, he was awarded an ensigncy in the 43rd Regiment of Foot by the Duke of Cumberland.

== North America ==
In 1754 Knox, still with the 43rd, purchased a lieutenancy and three years later left Ireland with his regiment for Halifax, Nova Scotia. The 43rd were initially intended to support the Earl of Loudon's operation against Louisbourg but this expedition never took place as a result of a combination of poor weather conditions and a strong French naval contingent. Nor did Knox's regiment take part in Amherst's successful campaign the following year. Instead, they spent those two years stationed at Fort Cumberland and around Annapolis.

Knox noted in his diary that, "Though we are said to be in possession of Nova Scotia, yet it is in reality of a few fortresses only, the French and the Indians disputing the country with us on every occasion, inch by inch, even within range of our artillery; so that, as I have observed before, when the troops are not numerous, they cannot venture in safety beyond their walls".

=== Quebec ===
In the spring of 1759, the 43rd were sent to join General Wolfe's troops for the assault on Quebec. Serving under James Murray, Knox was present at the Battle of the Plains of Abraham. While surveying the Montmorency Falls on 24 August Knox's journal records how he narrowly avoided being shot when a French soldier's musket misfired. By September, Wolfe was desperate to bring the siege to a conclusion. He called a meeting of his brigadiers and an amphibious assault on the Anse du Foulon was decided upon. Here a narrow pathway provided access to the Plains of Abraham. The landing took place on the night of the 12th-13th. A French-speaking officer, (perhaps Donald MacDonald), fooled the sentry guarding the track, and by morning ten battalions of British troops had formed up on the Plains of Abraham. Knox's regiment was at the centre with the 47th, with orders not to fire until the enemy were within 40 paces. Knox noted how the French released their first full volley at some 136 yards but the enemy's fire was met with "...the greatest intrepidity and firmness". When the British finally returned fire, Knox describes how they did so with "great calmness" and how the resulting discharge was as close and heavy as any performed. This short-range volley was one of the most destructive in military history. A second volley was fired and then the British army charged. The French were routed and the city surrendered five days later.

=== Sainte Foy, 2nd Quebec and Montreal ===
The Duc de Levis, intent on expelling the British, returned to Quebec the following spring with an army of 7,000 men. James Murray felt his depleted force of 4,000 would be unable to hold the city, the defences of which had not been improved over the winter. With insufficient time to entrench, Murray, like Montcalm, decided to go on the offensive and on 28 April 1760 he marched his troops out of the city to do battle with a superior French force. Knox describes how, in order to appear more numerous, certain portions of the British army were drawn up two deep. Murray thought his best chance was to attack the French before they had time to form up; this tactic proved successful at first, due in part to the more numerous British artillery. When the British were required to advance, however, they had to do so without their guns, which had become stuck in the mud and snow. Knox's diary describes how his regiment, the 43rd, together with the 3rd battalion of Americans, captured and briefly held two redoubts before being pushed back. Eventually, the British were forced to retreat to the city, which, despite heavy losses, they were able to hold until reinforcements arrived in May. Levis was then obliged to retire to Montreal. Knox took part in the subsequent Montreal Campaign where, in September, Levis would be compelled to surrender to a much larger British force.

== Later career ==
By the end of 1760, Knox was a captain in an independent company in England. This company briefly formed part of the 99th Foot regiment, before it was disbanded following the Treaty of Paris (1763). It was around this time that Knox, now residing in Gloucester on half-pay, wrote his two-volume book An Historical Journal of the Campaigns in North America for the Years 1757, 1758, 1759 and 1760, published in London in 1769. The work, a composite of Knox's own diary, official documents and operational orders, is today considered one of the most important and complete account of these campaigns. This work was edited by Arthur Doughty and republished in three parts in 1914 as part of the General Series of the Champlain Society.

== Personal life ==
Knox married a well-to-do Irish lady, Jane Carre, in 1751. Her estate, however, was managed by a trustee and Knox never fully benefited from her wealth. Knox and his wife had a son, whom they both outlived.

== Bibliography ==
- Holmes, Richard (2001). Redcoat: The British Soldier in the Age of the Horse and Musket. London: Harper Perennial. ISBN 978-0-00-653152-4.
- Knox, John. Historical Journal of the Campaigns in North America for the Years 1757, 1758, 1759 and 1760 Vol. 1. Edited by Arthur Doughty. Champlain Society
- Knox, John. Historical Journal of the Campaigns in North America for the Years 1757, 1758, 1759 and 1760 Vol. 2. Edited by Arthur Doughty. Champlain Society
- Knox, John. Historical Journal of the Campaigns in North America for the Years 1757, 1758, 1759 and 1760. Vol. 3. Edited by Arthur Doughty. Champlain Society
- Snow, Dan (2009). Death or Victory - The Battle of Quebec and The Birth of Empire. London: Harper Collins. ISBN 978-0-00-728620-1.
