= Fort Vieux Logis =

British fort in present-day Canada

Coordinates: 45°06′47″N 64°16′50″W

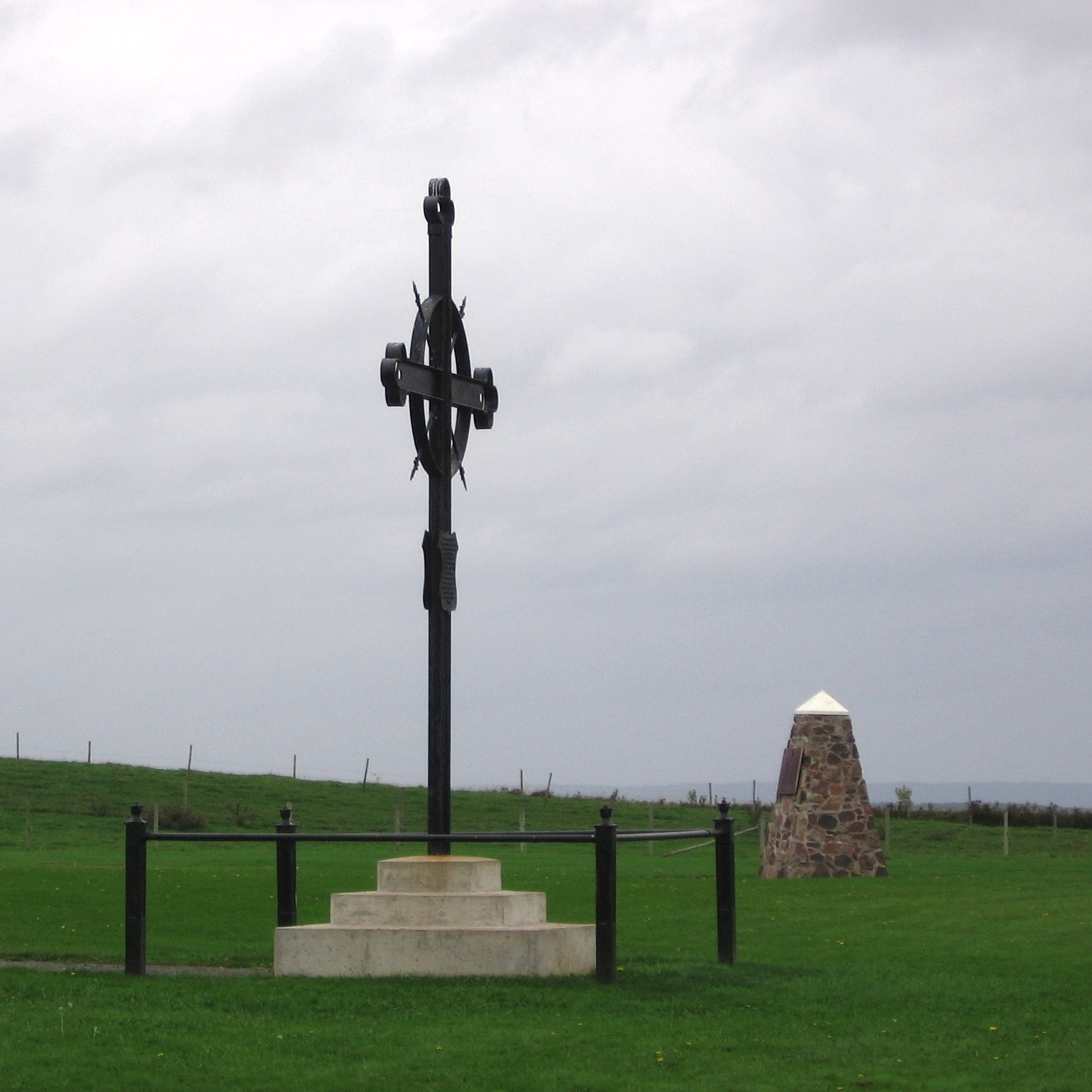
- Established: 1749 - 1754
- Location: Hortonville, Nova Scotia, Canada
- Type: National Historic Site
- Website: Grand Pre National Historic Park

Fort Vieux Logis (later named Fort Montague) was a small British frontier fort built at present-day Hortonville, Nova Scotia, Canada (formerly part of Grand Pre) in 1749, during Father Le Loutre's War (1749). Ranger John Gorham moved a blockhouse he erected in Annapolis Royal in 1744 to the site of Vieux Logis. The fort was in use until 1754. The British rebuilt the fort again during the French and Indian War and named it Fort Montague (1760).

The site of the fort is near the field where the Acadian Cross and the New England Planter's monument are located. Despite archeological efforts to locate it, the exact site of the fort is unknown.

Despite the British Conquest of Acadia in 1710, Nova Scotia remained primarily populated by Catholic Acadians and Mi'kmaq. During King George's War, the British tried to occupy further up the Bay of Fundy, starting with Grand Pre. They built a palisade which was involved with in the Siege of Grand Pre.

== Father Le Loutre’s War ==
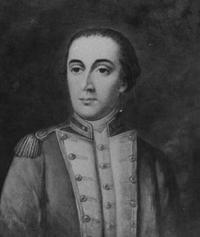
Captain Nicholas Cox, commander (1753-54)

Father Le Loutre's War began when Edward Cornwallis arrived to establish Halifax with 13 transports on June 21, 1749. The British quickly began to build other settlements. To guard against Mi'kmaq, Acadian and French attacks on the new Protestant settlements, British fortifications were erected in Halifax (1749), Bedford (Fort Sackville) (1749), Dartmouth (1750), Lunenburg (1753) and Lawrencetown (1754).

Within 18 months of establishing Halifax, the British also took firm control of peninsula Nova Scotia by building fortifications in all the major Acadian communities: present-day Windsor (Fort Edward); Grand Pre (Fort Vieux Logis) and Chignecto (Fort Lawrence). (A British fort already existed at the other major Acadian centre of Annapolis Royal, Nova Scotia. Cobequid remained without a fort.) The fort was created to help prevent the Acadian Exodus from the region.

The journal of Henry Grace includes a description of Fort Vieux Logis:

Menas [sic] Fort is built with square Timber and placed Piece upon Piece with Blockhouses in it, the same as Pisgate (Fort Edward). There is not much open Land about it, only where the French Neutrals lived.

=== Siege of Grand Pre ===
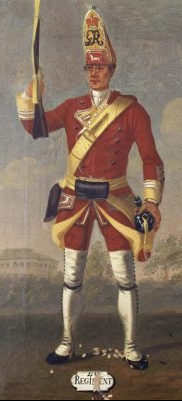
40th Regiment of Foot by David Morier, 1751

On November 27, 1749, 300 of the Wabanaki Confederacy (Mi'kmaq, Maliseet) and Acadians attacked the British Fort Vieux Logis. The fort was under the command of Captain John Handfield. While surveying the fort's environs, Lieutenant John Hamilton and eighteen soldiers (including Captain Handfield's son John) under his command were captured. After the British soldiers were captured, the native and Acadian militias made several attempts over the next week to lay siege to the fort before breaking off the engagement. Gorham’s Rangers was sent to relieve the fort. When he arrived the militia had already departed with the prisoners. The prisoners spent several years in captivity before being ransomed.

In 1750, six British soldiers from the 40th Regiment of Foot tried to desert the fort. Cornwallis sentenced them to death. Two of them were shot. Three of them were hanged and their bodies left to hang in chains.

The first raid on Halifax happened in October 1750, while in the woods on peninsular Halifax; Mi'kmaq scalped two British people and took six prisoner: Cornwallis' gardener, his son were tortured and scalped. The Mi'kmaq buried the son while the gardener's body was left behind. Cornwallis presumed the other six prisoners were also killed and it was not until five months later he discovered they were being held prisoner at Grand Pre. In response, Cornwallis had soldiers from Fort Vieux Logis take ransom the local priest until the six British prisoners were released.

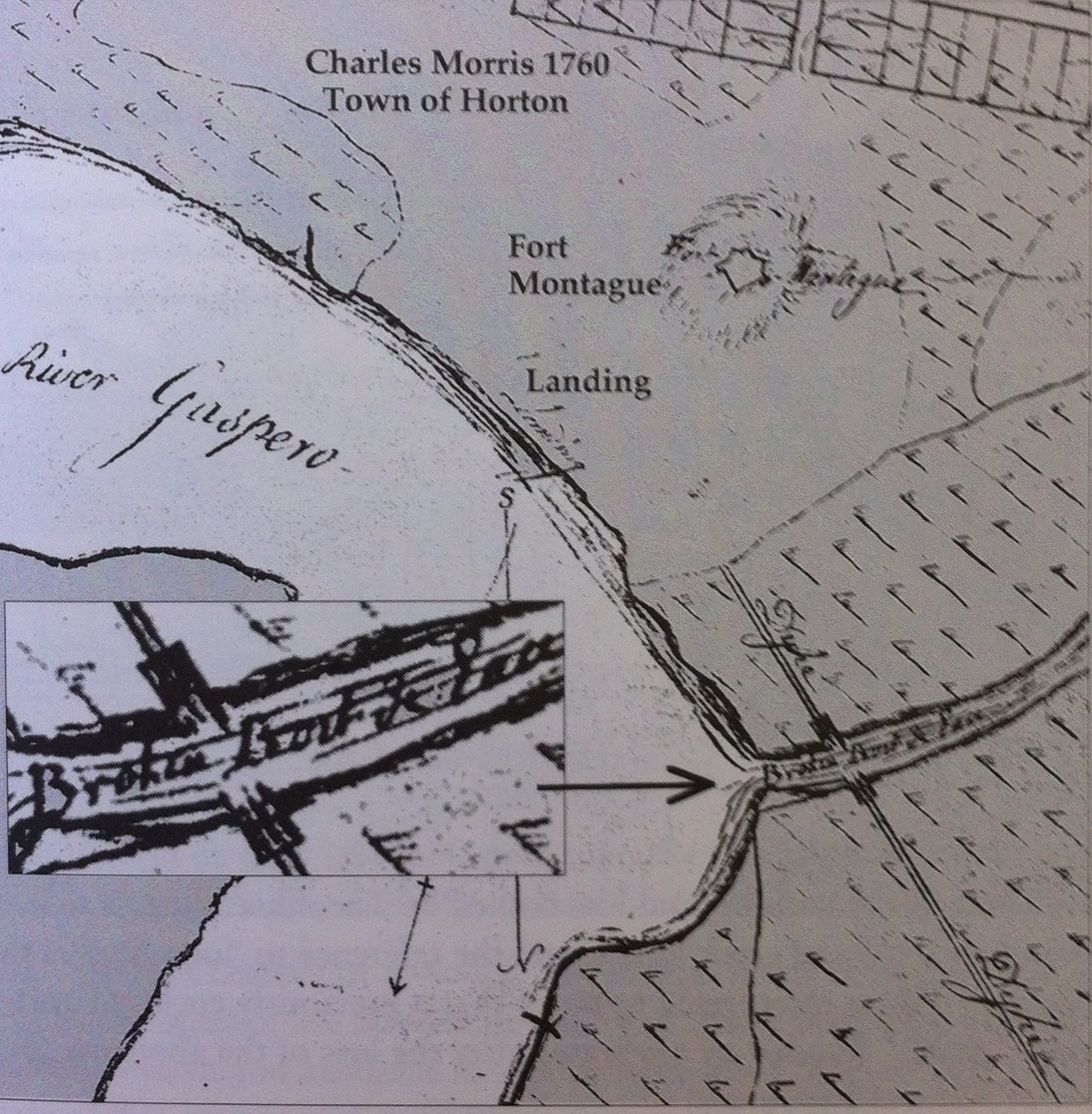
Fort Montague, Charles Morris Map 1760

November 1, 1753, Captain Cox was the commander of Fort Vieux Logis.

The improvised nature of the fort, whose palisade was so low that snow drifts often buried them, and its exposed location, overlooked by nearby hills, led the British to abandon it in 1754. When new British troops were sent to Grand Pre for the Expulsion of the Acadians in 1755, they chose the church at Grand Pre as their base instead.

The blockhouse was rebuilt in 1760 and named Fort Montague, named after Montague Wilmot.

=== Commanders ===
- Captain John Handfield
- Capt Matthew Floyer
- Nicholas Cox, commander (1753–54) (who later became a commander at Fort Edward)

== See also ==
- Military history of Nova Scotia
