= William Alexander (the younger) =

Governor of Nova Scotia

Sir William Alexander (c. 1602 – 18 May 1638) was the founder, in 1629, of the Scottish colony of Nova Scotia with the establishment of Charles Fort, now the site of modern Annapolis Royal, Nova Scotia, Canada. His expedition partner, James Stewart, 4th Lord Ochiltree established a short-lived settlement at Baleine on Cape Breton Island, some 600 km (373 mi) northeast.

== Career ==
Alexander was the son of colonizer and Scottish courtier William Alexander, 1st Earl of Stirling, but predeceased his father. He was a courtier to Henry Frederick, Prince of Wales, and then a Gentleman Usher to Charles I of England. Alexander published An Encouragement to colonies in 1624.

== Charles Fort ==
It was on the site of Charles Fort that the returning French in 1632 built their second settlement known by the name of Port-Royal.

For many years the site of Alexander's settlement, known as Charles Fort or Scots Fort, was thought to be on the hillside overlooking the Habitation. This site, marked by a stone monument and brass plaque, was designated a National Historic Site of Canada in 1951. The plaque has been removed and relocated as the actual site of Charles Fort has been established through archaeological evidence at Annapolis Royal; lying beneath Fort Anne.
