= Ranald MacDonald (disambiguation) =

Ranald MacDonald (1824–1894) was the first native English-speaker to teach the English language in Japan.

Ranald MacDonald may also refer to:

- Ranald MacDonald (bishop) (1756–1832), Scottish Roman Catholic bishop
- Ranald MacDonald (founder of Clanranald), Scottish, founder of the MacDonald of Clanranald
- Ranald Og MacDonald, captured Dunyvaig Castle in 1614
- Ranald Macdonald (1928–1999), Scottish rugby player
- Ranald Macdonald (journalist) (born 1938), Australian journalist, media executive, broadcaster and educator
- Ranald George Macdonald (1788–1873), Scottish clan chief and Member of Parliament
- Ranald Roderick Macdonald (1945–2007), British mathematician and psychologist
- Ranald Macdonald (businessperson) (1860–1928), New Zealand businessperson, motorist, and local politician

== See also ==
- Ronald McDonald (disambiguation)
