= Donald Stone Macdonald =

American Koreanist (1919–1993)

Donald Stone Macdonald (1919 – August 29, 1993) was an American academic who specialized in Korean affairs, in particular the bilateral relations between South Korea and the United States. Macdonald had two careers, both concerning Korea. He was first a public servant at the US Department of State in Korean affairs, once serving as mayor of Kwangju and then became an academic on Korean affairs. His death in 1993 marked the end of almost five decades of involvement in Korea, dating from 1945 and the U.S. military occupation.

== Early life and education ==
Born in 1919 in Boston, Massachusetts in the United States, Macdonald was educated at the Massachusetts Institute of Technology where he earned his B.A. He proceeded to Harvard University where he earned a M. A. in Political Science before moving to Washington, D.C. where he earned his doctorate in political science at the George Washington University.

== Career ==
He then began a career at the State Department in 1945, focusing on Korea. There, he served as the Director of the Korea Desk and in the Bureau of Intelligence and Research, dividing his time between Washington and Seoul. It was to herald the start of 48 years of continuous involvement in Korea, and at one stage, he served as the mayor of Kwangju. During his State Department career, Macdonald received the Department's Superior Honor Award three times, and was given the John Jacobs Rogers Award for Distinguished Service. In addition to posting in South Korea, he served in the Foreign Service in Turkey and Switzerland.

Macdonald taught at East Stroudsburg University in Pennsylvania from 1971 to 1980. In 1983, he created the Korea program at Georgetown University, where he taught until his death. Aside from his formal academic contributions, Macdonald oversaw Korean area studies at the State Department's Foreign Service Institute for a number of years. In the 1960s, he was one of the founders of the Washington Korea Tuesday Luncheon Group, and was a prominent figure in international conferences on Korea. Macdonald was a president of the Mid Atlantic Region of the Association of Asian Studies, and after his term ended he was active on its membership committee and in reforming its governance. He founded and edited the MidAtlantic Bulletin of Korean Studies. He continually worked to expand knowledge of Korea and Asia within the academic community, into the education system and the wider public. Macdonald was prominent in establishing the Wineck Prize for the best high school essay on Asian studies in the mid-Atlantic region, and worked to disseminate knowledge of Korea outside specialist circles.

== Publications ==
Pedagogically speaking, Macdonald's university textbook, The Koreans: Contemporary Politics and Society was the most popular university text on the subject. Macdonald was also the author of U.S.-Korea Relations from Liberation to Self-Reliance, which resulted from a classified study he undertook for the State Department. At the time of his death, he had partially completed a book on Korean politics, for which he had been awarded a Fulbright Scholarship to Korea.

== Non profit ==
Macdonald was a founder of Senior International Resources, a not-for-profit consulting firm. His social and educational concerns were reflected in his donations of time and funds for such activities.
