= Ronald MacDonald =

Ronald MacDonald may refer to:

- Ronald MacDonald (athlete) (1874–1947), Canadian runner
- Ronald MacDonald (bishop) (1835–1912), Canadian Roman Catholic bishop
- Ronald MacDonald (economist) (born 1955), Scottish economist
- Ronald MacDonald (rugby), New Zealand rugby league international and rugby union player
- Ronald St. John Macdonald (1928–2006), Canadian legal academic and jurist
- Ron MacDonald (politician) (born 1955), member of the Canadian House of Commons
- Ronald MacDonald, author, father of Philip MacDonald (1900–1980)
- Ronald Archibald Bosville-Macdonald, 6th Baron Macdonald (1853–1947), 6th Baron Macdonald

== See also ==
- Ranald MacDonald (1824–1894), first man to teach the English language in Japan
- Ronald McDonald (disambiguation)
