= Otho Hamilton =

Canadian politician

Major Otho Hamilton (c.1690 – 26 February 1770) was a military officer of the 40th Regiment of Foot who served on the Nova Scotia Council and as Governor of Placentia.

He was born in Edinburgh, Scotland, one of the 12 children of Thomas and Grizel Hamilton.

In 1710 he joined the British Army as an ensign in the Earl of Portmore’s Regiment of Foot (later the 2nd Regiment of Foot, and was posted to Nova Scotia. In 1717 he transferred to the newly created regiment of Colonel Richard Philipps (later the 40th Regiment of Foot), becoming a lieutenant in 1718, adjutant of the regiment in 1729, captain in 1739 and major in January 1745/46.

He became involved in the government of Nova Scotia, firstly as secretary and then as a member of the Council. He was also co-opted into two commissions to resolve border disputes. In 1744 he was appointed Lieutenant-governor of Placentia, Newfoundland, where he worked to improve the conditions of the colony and the military garrison, remaining there until at least 1764. He was involved in the removal of the Acadians at Annapolis.

By 1768 he had returned to Great Britain and taken up residence in Waterford, Ireland, where he died in 1770. He was the father of Captain John Hamilton who was taken into captivity during the Siege of Grand Pre.

== See also ==
- List of lieutenant governors of Newfoundland and Labrador
