= Donald McDonald (Province of Canada politician) =

Politician from Province of Canada

Member of the Legislative Assembly of the Province of Canada for Prescott
- In office 1841–1844
- Preceded by: New position
- Succeeded by: Neil Stewart

Personal details
- Party: Reformer

Donald McDonald was a member of the Legislative Assembly of the First Parliament of the Province of Canada. He was elected to represent the Prescott electoral district in the first general election of 1841, and served throughout the term of the first Parliament. He supported the union of Upper Canada and Lower Canada into the new Province of Canada. Considered a moderate Reformer, he gradually aligned with Robert Baldwin, the Reform leader dedicated to the establishment of responsible government. McDonald was defeated in the general election of 1844.
