= Donald MacDonald (army officer) =

French soldier (c. 1724–1760)

Captain Donald MacDonald (c. 1724–1760) was a military officer who fought for France, for Charles Edward Stuart in Scotland, and later for Great Britain in Quebec.

== Life ==
MacDonald (sometimes spelt MacDonell) was the second son of Ranald MacDonald, 18th Chief of Clanranald. When still young he was sent to France where he received a commission in the Royal-Ecossais Regiment of the French army. In 1745 he was sent by King Louis XV to assist Charles Edward Stuart in the Jacobite rising. MacDonald was wounded at the siege of Stirling Castle and imprisoned after the surrender of the Jacobite forces. As a French officer he was released from imprisonment and returned to France.

MacDonald took advantage of the amnesty which was granted by Britain to Jacobite officers, and on 12 January 1757 was gazetted a captain in the regiment raised by Simon Fraser, the 78th Fraser Highlanders. In 1758 MacDonald sailed to Louisbourg which was then under siege as part of the Seven Years' War. He was wounded there on the night of 21 July.

MacDonald participated in the subsequent siege of Quebec. On the night of 13 September 1759 he was part of the forlorn hope, the twenty-four volunteers leading the British attempt to climb the cliffs rising above the St. Lawrence River. It was MacDonald who responded in French to the challenge of the French guards, buying time for enough men to gather and overpower the post. This in turn allowed almost 5,000 British troops to climb the cliffs and mass on the Plains of Abraham. During the subsequent winter, MacDonald was given several independent commands, constantly harassing the French outposts surrounding Quebec.

At the Battle of Sainte-Foy, 28 April 1760, MacDonald commanded a company of volunteers on the left flank of the British army and was killed in the action.

There is significant evidence that MacDonald was a harsh officer disliked by his own men as well as by his opponents. He received the nickname "Dòmhnaill Goran" (Donald the Sinister). There is some indication that his wounding at Louisbourg may have been an attempted "fragging" by his own men. When he was killed at Sillery, his body was hacked to pieces.
