= Fort Anne =

Historic fort in Nova Scotia, Canada

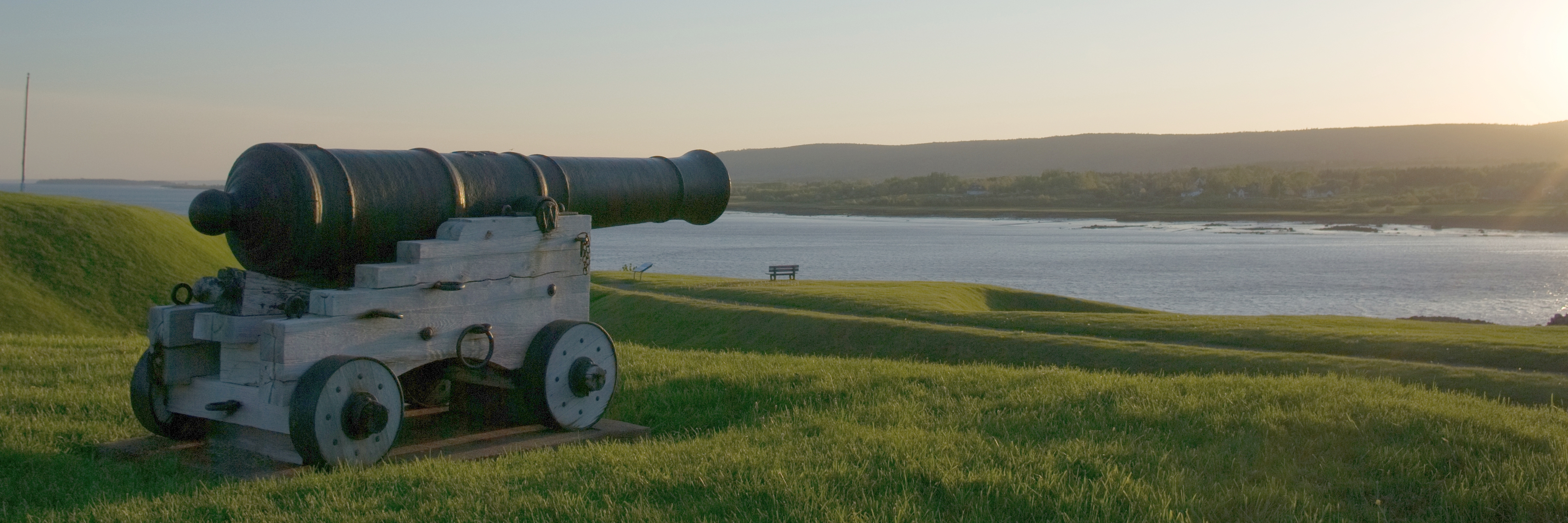
- Fort Anne at sunset
- Former name: Charles Fort (1629–1632); Le Fort du Port Royal (1632–1713)
- Established: August 1, 1629
- Location: Annapolis Royal, Nova Scotia, Canada
- Coordinates: 44.741°N 65.518°W

National Historic Site of Canada
- Official name: Fort Anne National Historic Site of Canada
- Designated: January 30, 1920

Fort Anne is a historic fort protecting the harbour of Annapolis Royal, Nova Scotia. It was built by Scottish settlers in August 1629 as Charles Fort. For the first 120 years of the fort's service period, the settlement of Port Royal, later Annapolis Royal, was the capital of the New France colony of Acadia and British North America colony of Nova Scotia. In 1917, Fort Anne became the first National Historic Site of Canada. Although no longer in active service, it is the oldest extant fort in Canada. Fort Anne has provided more defensive service than any other fort in North America, having been attacked and blockaded at least 19 times over a service period of 225 years, from the Acadian Civil War through to the American Revolutionary War. The fort also contains the oldest military building in Canada and the oldest building administered by Parks Canada, the 1708 powder magazine.

The importance of Port Royal as a settlement site was first recognised by Pierre Dugua, Lieutenant General of New France, in 1604. After the nearby fortified habitation he constructed was destroyed by a raid from Virginia in 1613, a new fort was built on the current site by Scottish settlers in 1629 under the leadership of Sir William Alexander. The new construction was called Charles Fort after Charles I, King of Scotland. The fort was acquired by the French in 1632 and would later pass between the French, English and British until the area was finally ceded to Great Britain in 1713 at the end of Queen Anne's War. The last assault on the fort was from American privateers in 1781 during the American Revolutionary War. Although the possibility existed for attacks during the War of 1812, none occurred.

Fort Anne was acquired by the Dominion Parks Branch, the predecessor of Parks Canada, in 1917 and transitioned to the new designation of National Historic Site of Canada in 1920.

The Fort Anne National Historic Site encompasses not only the current Vauban fort, but also several associated historic sites, including the Garrison Cemetery and the Charles Fort National Historic Site. Construction of the fort required the expropriation of the core of the original Acadian settlement of Port-Royal, including the town windmill, the site of the parish church, and properties owned by Acadia's earliest settlers.

The grounds are open year round. Parks Canada operates a museum in the 1797 Officer's Quarters daily from mid-May until mid-October.

Numerous events take place in and around the fort during the year, normally culminating on Natal Day, the first Monday in August.

== Geography and early history ==
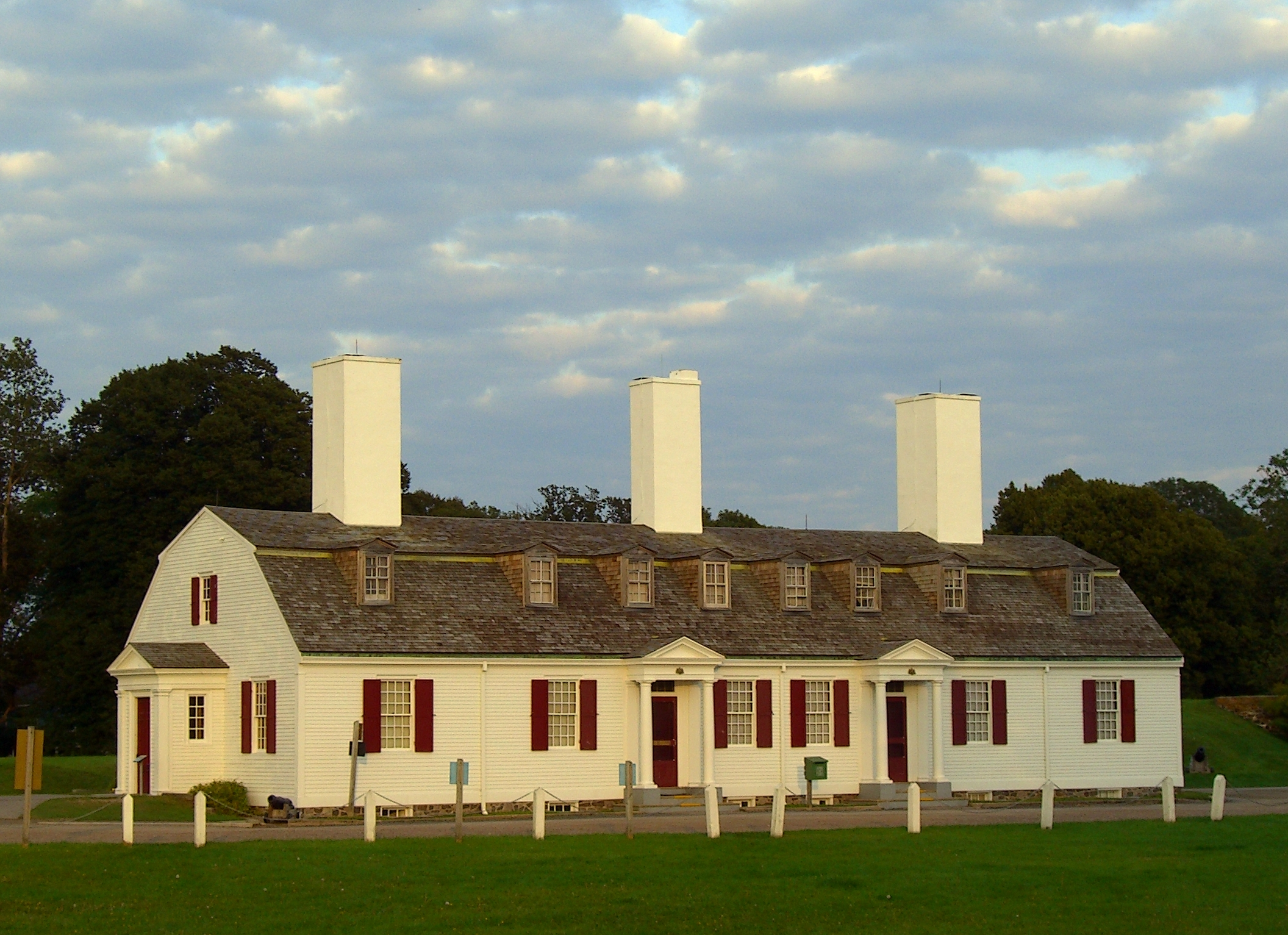
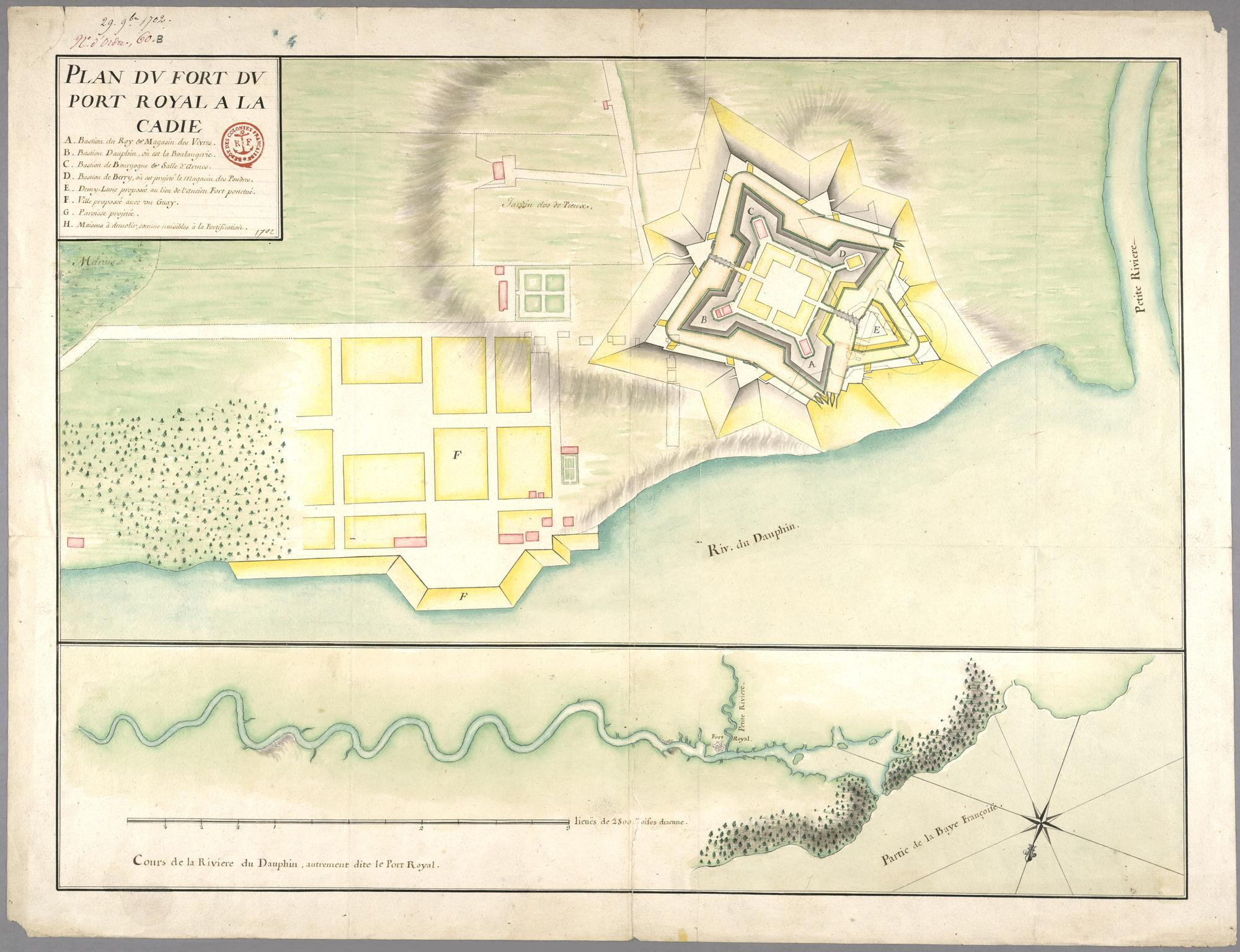
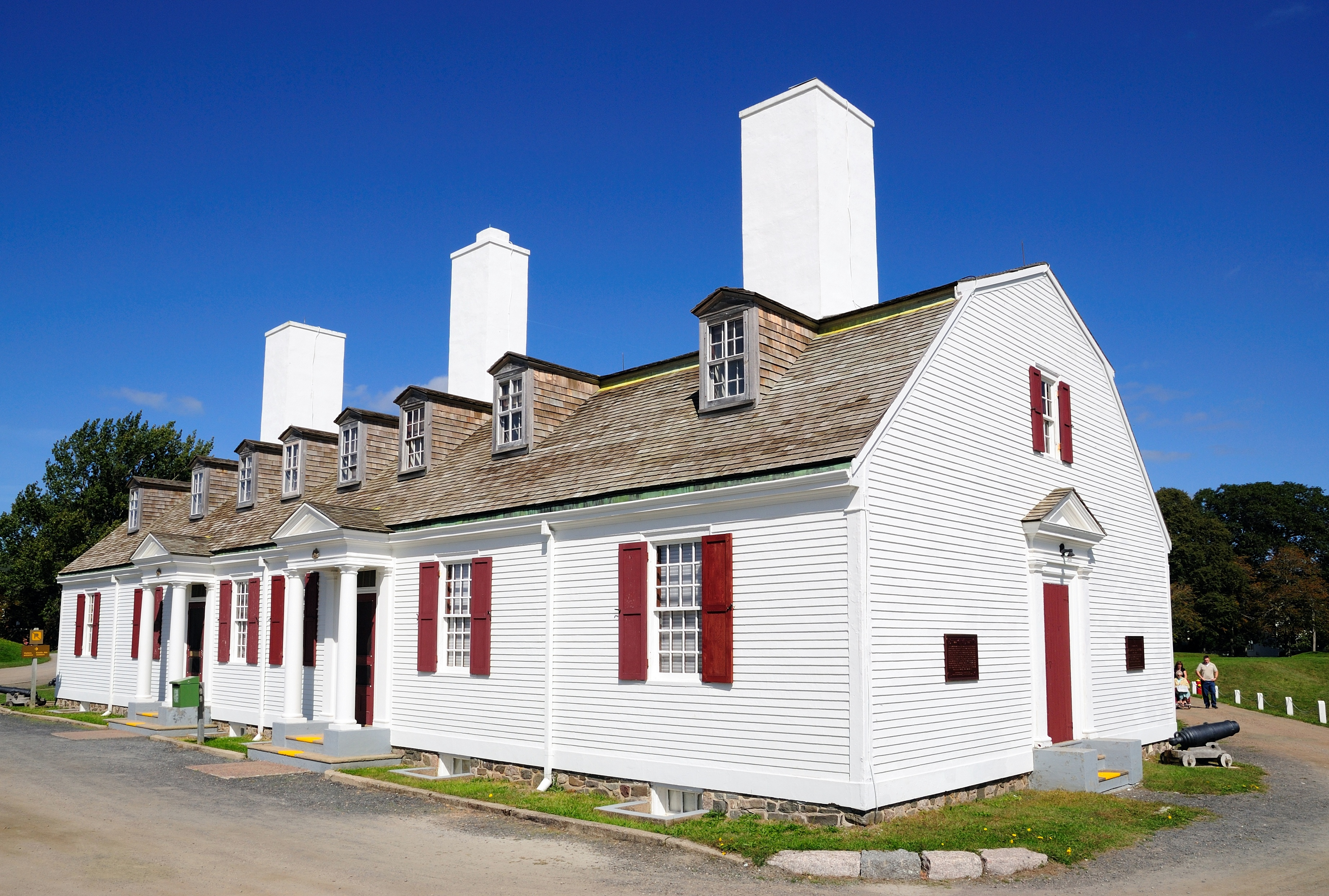
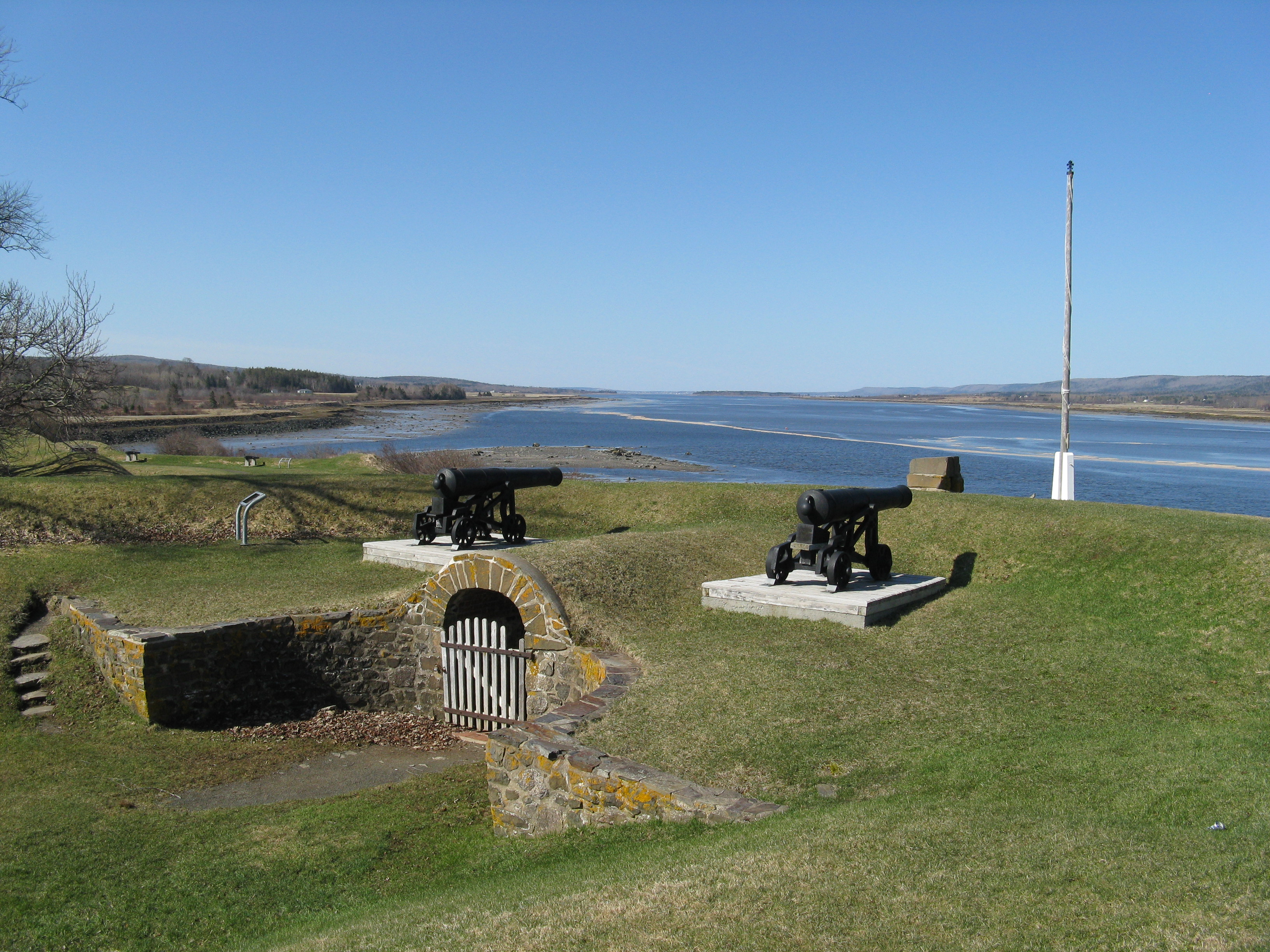
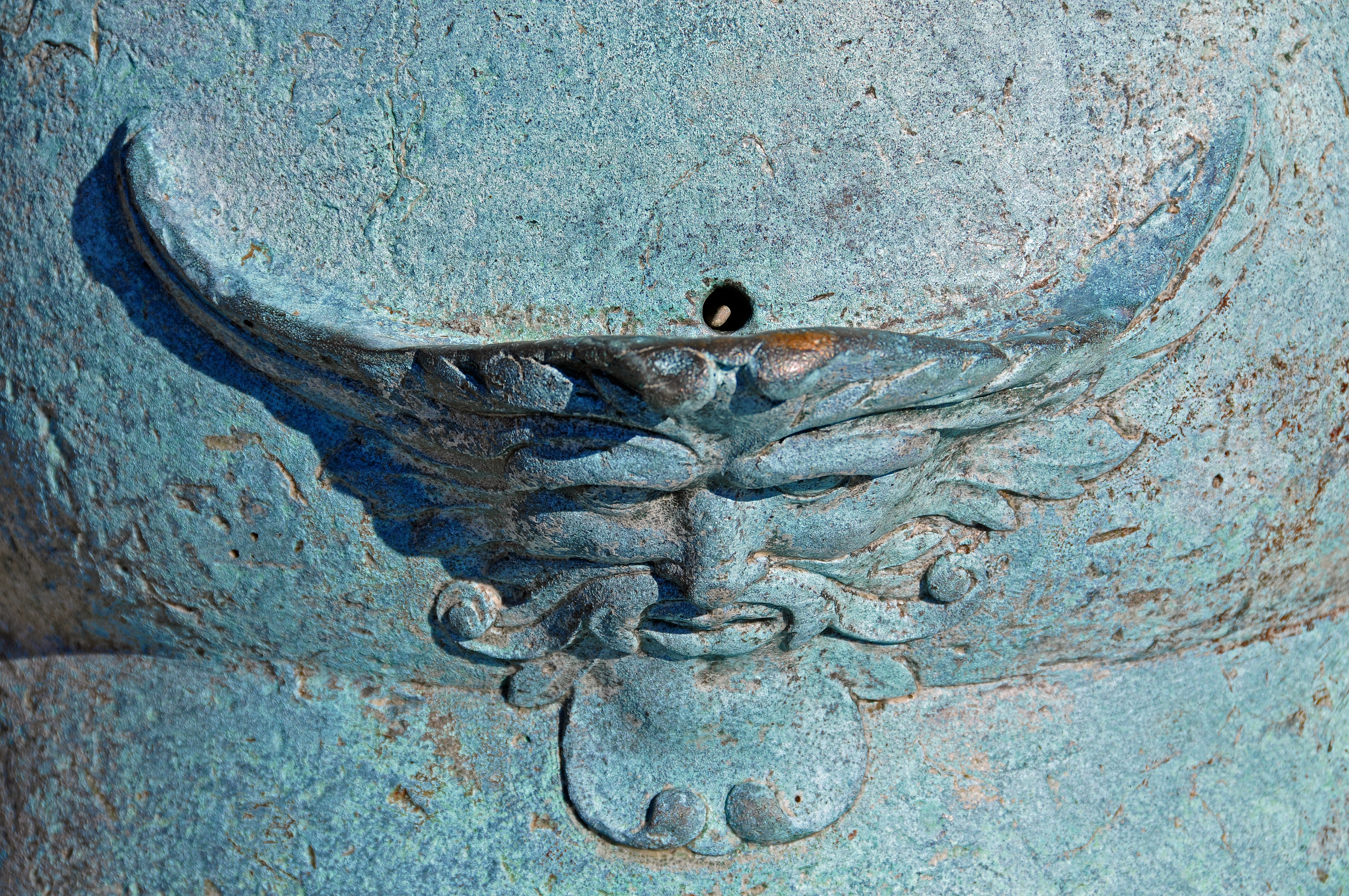
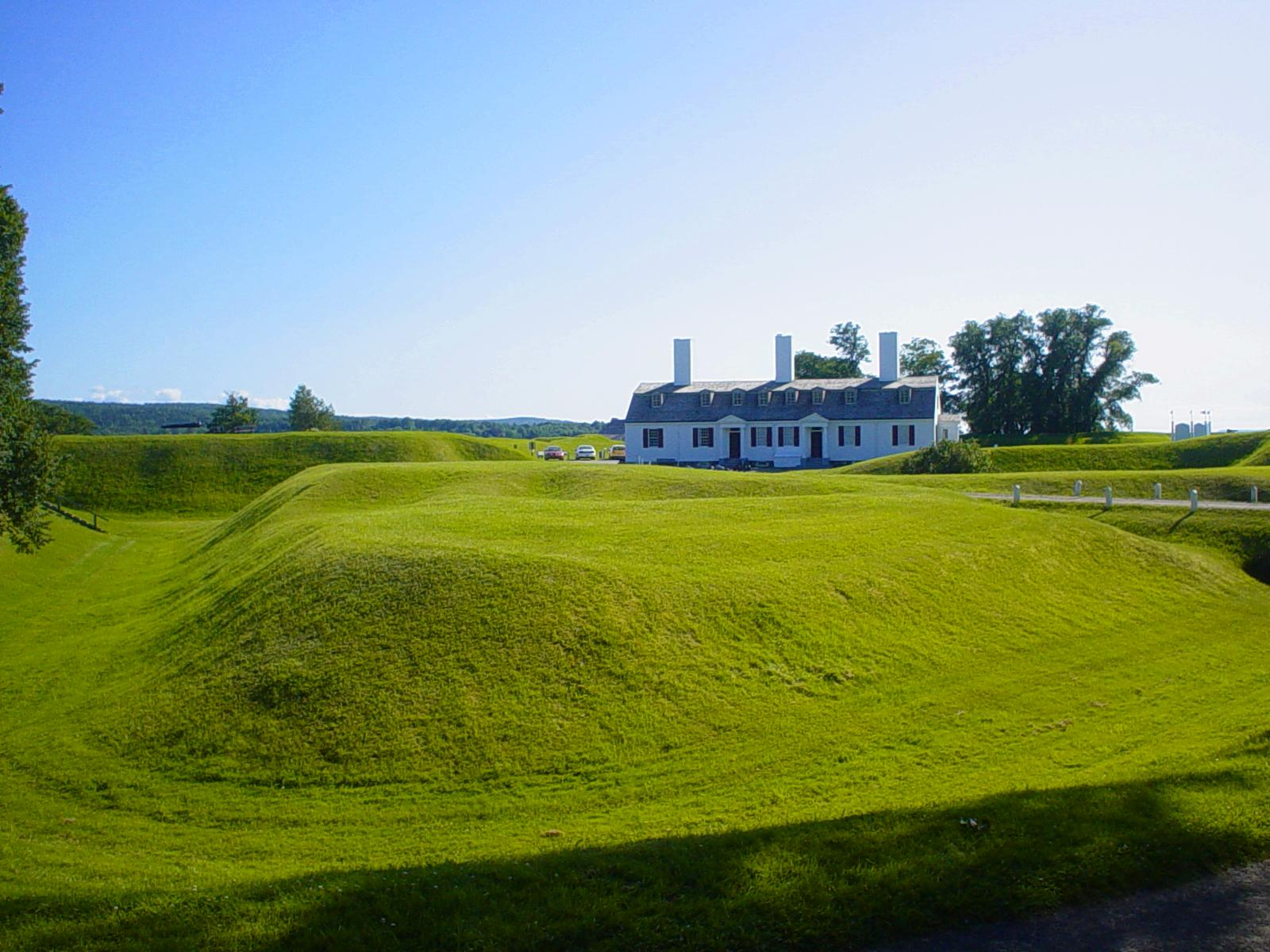
From top and left to right: officer's quarters containing museum, 1702 map, officer's quarters, view from fort looking south, French mortar, earthen ravelin with officer's quarters

The Annapolis Basin was part of a larger areas known as "Kespukwitk" meaning "Land's End" in the Mi'kmaq language and covered the southern peninsula of modern Nova Scotia. Allains Creek, was the site of a traditional Mi'kmaq campsite as it was on a key canoe and portage route across southern Nova Scotia. Nonetheless, Pierre Dugua chose a site on the opposite side of the Annapolis Basin to build his habitation in 1605. When the habitation was destroyed in 1613, it was not rebuilt despite the continued settlement of the area by the French.

== Scottish period (1629–1632) ==
In 1629, the first fort on the site of present-day Fort Anne was constructed by Scottish settlers. Although the Scottish expedition was aware of the French fortified habitation at Port Royal on the other side of the Annapolis Basin, they chose a new site at the confluence of the Annapolis River and Allains Creek. This site received the natural protection of the rivers and was adjacent to an agricultural area that was previously developed by the French. Construction of the new fort began on 1 August 1629 and was completed within a few weeks. According to Richard Guthry, a witness of the time, "The first of August...was the foundation of our fort laid." Although the fort would be redeveloped several times, Charles Fort, through its successor Fort Anne, is arguably the oldest extant European construction in Canada.

Guthry further describes,

"The platt of the fort wes drawen by Captane Ogilvie in forme of a pentagonon, with many horne works good both for offence and defence...befor the latter end of the month the fort with the infinit pains and alacrity both of sea and land men was finished, eight pieces of ordinance planted, four demi culvering, and four minion, out magasene built and stored, the Generals house formed."

== First French period (1632–1654) ==
In 1632, Acadia, along with Quebec and Cape Breton Island, reverted to French control due to the Treaty of Saint-Germain-en-Laye. As a result, Charles Fort was handed over to the French. A new earthwork fort was constructed to replace the Scottish fort by 1643. The fort would be attacked three times over the next 22 years. It repelled the first two attacks by fellow French settlers during the Acadian Civil War, but fell to the English in 1654.

=== Acadian Civil War ===
Battle of Port Royal (1640) - Charles de La Tour attacked Port Royal with two armed ships. Port Royal Governor D'Aulnay's captain was killed, nonetheless La Tour and his men were forced to surrender.

Battle of Port Royal (1643) - In 1643 La Tour tried to capture Port Royal again. D'Aulnay resisted the attack, with seven of his men wounded and three killed. La Tour did not attack the fort, which was defended by twenty soldiers. However, he burned the mill, killed the livestock and seized furs, gunpowder and other supplies.

Battle of Port Royal (1654) - In 1654, 100 New England volunteers and 200 English soldiers attacked approximately 130 defenders of Port Royal. After initial resistance, the outnumbered French surrendered. The English occupied Acadia for the next 16 years with a small garrison.

== English period (1654–1667) ==
The English period lasted 16 years, during which time the fort saw no major action. In 1667, Port Royal was returned to France as a result of the Treaty of Breda. Although under English rule, the population remained majority French.

== Second French period (1667–1713) ==
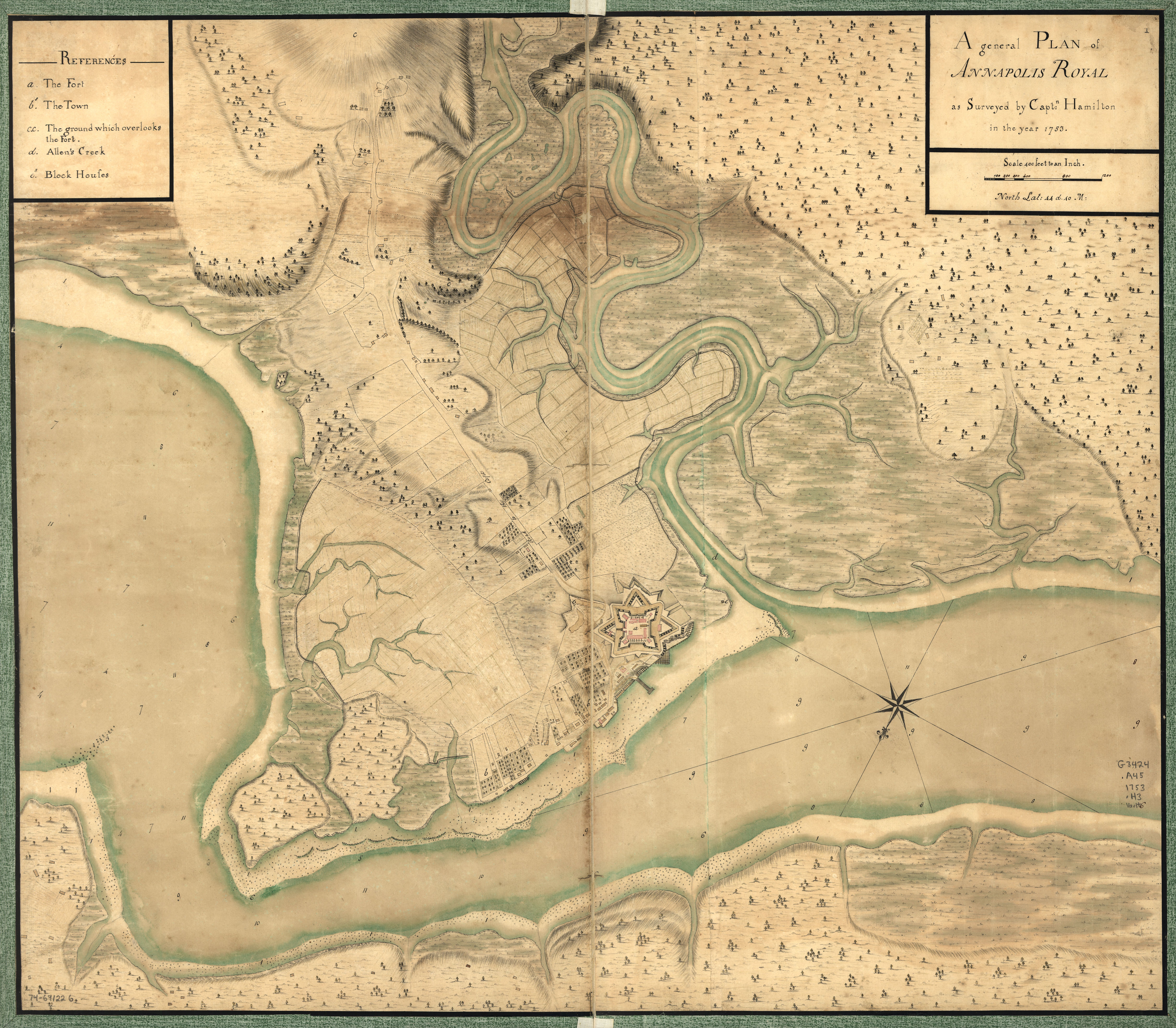
A view of Annapolis Royal in 1753

The second French period lasted 43 years. During King William's War (1688–1697), the fort was attacked three times. In 1689, a completely redesigned fort was begun that was around six times the size of the previous fort established by the Sir William Alexander in 1629 and strengthened by Governor D'Aulnay around 1643. Also around this time, the street layout adjacent the fort were altered to accommodate the massive new project. However, construction was only two weeks underway when all work was halted, leaving Port Royal without a working fort. When soldiers arrived from New England in 1690, it quickly succumbed to their attack, but was only briefly occupied. It was attacked two more times before the end of the war, but there was no territorial expansion by the English.

Work was recommenced on the fort in 1702, approximately on the footprint of the 1689 construction, but this time adhering to a Vauban configuration which remains largely intact to this day. From a defensive perspective, the Vauban star shape and gently sloping walls soften the angle of impact from incoming fire. The low profile of the walls reduce the size of the target. The soft earth has more mass to withstand impacts as well as reduces the quantity of projectiles if impacts occur. From an offensive perspective, the star shape enables more cannons to fire, no matter the angle of attack. Due largely to the revised fort configuration, when hostilities erupted during Queen Anne's War (1702-1713), the fort repelled three initial British attacks. However, It succumbed in 1710 to an overwhelming British force of 2,000 troops and 36 ships. The French made a minor attempt to retake the fort in 1711, but were unsuccessful.

=== King William's War ===
Battle of Port Royal (May 1690) - On 19 May 1690, a large force of New England provincial militia led by Sir William Phips arrived before Port Royal. The Governor of Acadia, Louis-Alexandre des Friches de Menneval, had only 70 soldiers and the fort was not prepared for an attack. Meneval quickly surrendered without resistance not long after the New Englanders arrived. After disagreements on the terms of surrender, the New Englanders plundered the Town and the Fort.

Battle of Port Royal (June 1690) - In June 1690, more soldiers arrived, this time from the Province of New York. They left after burning and looting the settlement.

Raid on Port Royal (1693) - English frigates from New England attacked Port Royal, burning almost a dozen houses and three barns full of grain.

=== Queen Anne's War ===
Blockade of Port Royal (1704) - In July 1704, in retaliation for the Raid on Deerfield, Major Benjamin Church blockaded Port Royal for 14 days. The fort had recently been upgraded in 1702 with a Vauban design, and those inside awaited an attack, which was not forthcoming. Church moved on to conduct the Raid on Grand Pré, Raid on Pisiguit, and Raid on Chignecto. He then returned to Port Royal and after a brief exchange of gunfire, returned to Boston.

Siege of Port Royal (June 1707) - In June 1707, Colonel John March, the most senior officer in Massachusetts was sent to capture Port Royal. Daniel d'Auger de Subercase, the Governor of Acadia, successfully defended the fort.

Siege of Port Royal (August 1707) - In August 1707, a second siege was launched by Colonel Francis Wainwright and lasted eleven days. Subercase and his troops killed sixteen New Englanders and lost three soldiers. This second attack on the fort during Queen Anne's War was unsuccessful.

Siege of Port Royal (1710) - In September 1710, the British returned. This time with an overwhelming force of 36 ships and 2,000 men, and again laid siege to the fort. Subercase and the French held out until October 2 when the approximately 300 defenders of the fort surrendered, ending French rule in Acadia.

Siege of Port Royal (1711) - After the French and Indian success at the nearby Battle of Bloody Creek (1711) an unsuccessful attempt was made by the French to recapture the fort.

== British period (1713–1854) ==
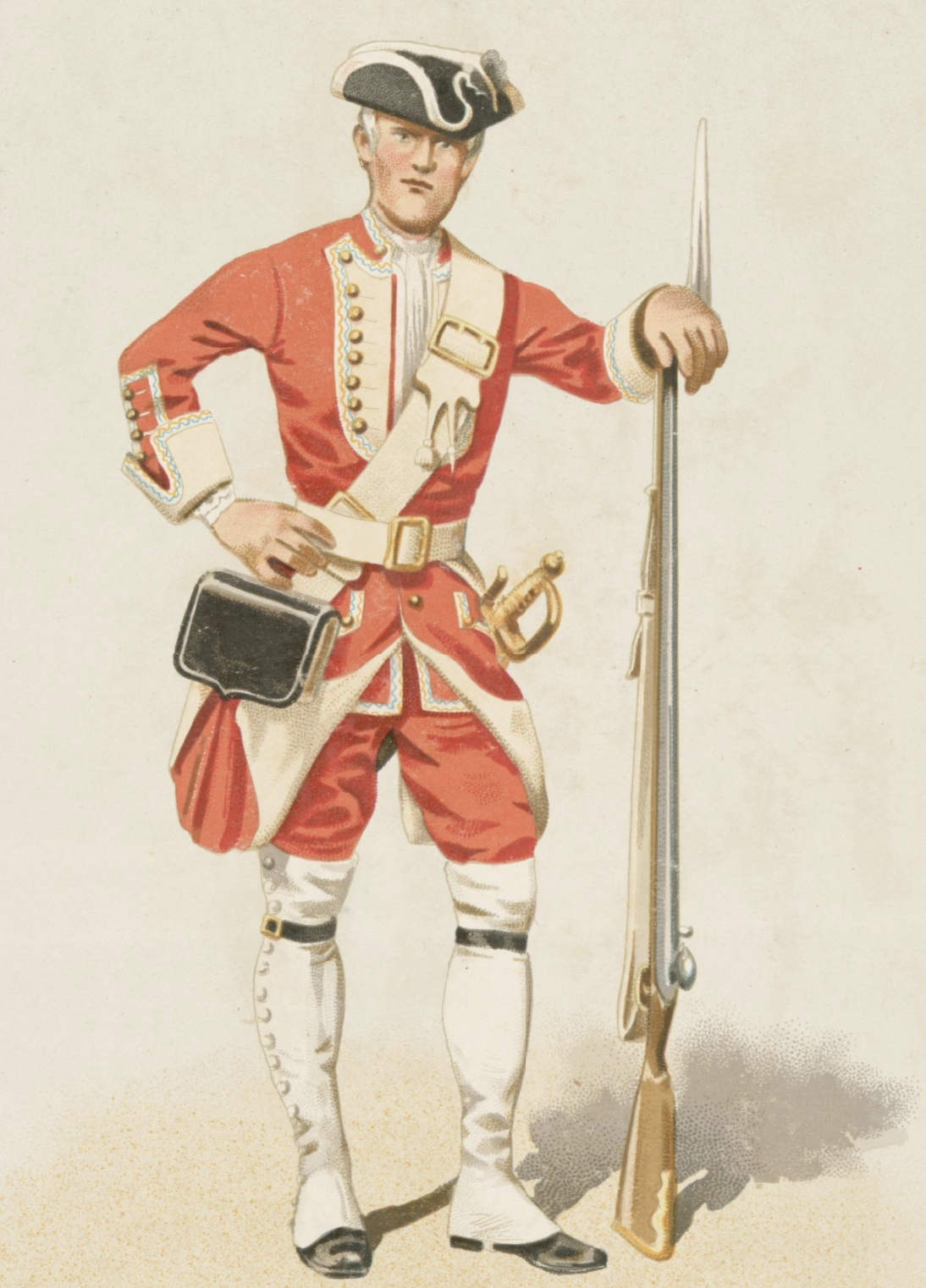
40th Regiment of Foot – raised at Fort Anne (1717)

British control of the fort lasted for 141 years. In 1713, as a result of the Treaty of Utrecht, a large portion of Acadia, including Port Royal, was officially ceded to Great Britain. The British had effectively been in control of the area since 1710. At this time, the town was renamed Annapolis Royal after Queen Anne. During Father Rale's War (1722–1725), the fort was unsuccessfully attacked twice by Mi'kmaq and Maliseet troops, although casualties occurred on both sides. The last major attempt to retake Fort Anne by the French was during King George's War (1744–1748). After 3 failed attempts to retake the fort during the war, the French launched a massive invasion fleet in 1746, the Duc d'Anville expedition, to retake both Port Royal and Louisbourg, which had fallen to the British in 1745. This operation also failed and was the last time the French attempted the Fort's recapture. During the American Revolutionary War (1775–1783), the fort was attacked twice by American privateers, although their interest lay in plunder rather than in conquest.

Although the possibility existed for attacks to occur on Fort Anne during the War of 1812 by American privateers, none occurred.

Upon the completion of the citadel at Halifax in 1854, the British Garrison at Fort Anne was permanently deployed to that location. Although the United Kingdom maintained ownership of Fort Anne until 1883, it no longer saw active service. Eventually, most of the fort's remaining buildings were destroyed or demolished until the Dominion Parks Branch, the predecessor of Parks Canada took interest in the site in 1917.

=== Father Rale's War ===
Blockade of Annapolis Royal (1722) - In response to a New England attack in March 1722, 165 Mi'kmaq and Maliseet troops attempted to lay siege to Annapolis Royal. Under potential siege, in May 1722, Lieutenant Governor John Doucett took 22 Mi'kmaq hostage at Annapolis Royal to prevent the capital from being attacked.

Raid on Annapolis Royal (1724) - In July 1724, 60 Mi'kmaq and Maliseets raided Annapolis Royal, killing a sergeant and a private, wounding four more soldiers, and terrorizing the town. They also burned houses and took prisoners. The British responded by executing one of the Mi'kmaq hostages.

=== King George's War ===
Siege of Annapolis Royal (July 1744) - Le Loutre gathered 300 Mi'kmaq warriors together, and they began their assault on Annapolis Royal on 12 July 1744. The Mi'kmaq outnumbered the New England regulars by three to one. Two New England regulars were captured and scalped. The assault lasted for four days, when the fort was relieved on 16 July by arriving New England soldiers.

Siege of Annapolis Royal (September 1744) - François Dupont Duvivier attacked Annapolis Royal in September 1744 with a locally raised force of 200 Acadians against 250 soldiers at the fort. The siege lasted for a week while both sides awaited reinforcements by sea. The first reinforcements to arrive were from Boston, not Louisbourg, causing Duvivier to retreat.

Siege of Annapolis Royal (1745) - In May 1745, Paul Marin de la Malgue led 200 troops, together with hundreds of Mi'kmaq in another siege against Annapolis Royal. The siege ended quickly when Marin was recalled to assist the defence of Louisbourg (1745).

Siege of Annapolis Royal (1746) - Led by Jean-Baptiste Nicolas Roch de Ramezay, the French laid siege to Annapolis Royal for 23 days, awaiting naval reinforcements. They never received the assistance they required from the ill-fated Duc d'Anville Expedition and were forced to retreat. This was the last major attempt by the French to retake Port Royal.

=== American Revolutionary War ===
Raid of Annapolis Royal (1778) - On 2 October 1778 the 84th Regiment defeated American privateers attempting a raid of Annapolis Royal. Captain MacDonald arrived by sea to find a large privateer ship raiding the port. He destroyed the privateer vessel, which had mounted ten carriage guns.

Raid of Annapolis Royal (1781) - In 1780, the permanent garrison at Fort Anne was deployed to assist British troops in South Carolina. On 29 August 1781, two large American privateer schooners attacked the undefended town. Both the fort and houses in the town were systematically looted. Two town residents were taken as hostages and later released.

== Fort Anne National Historic Site ==
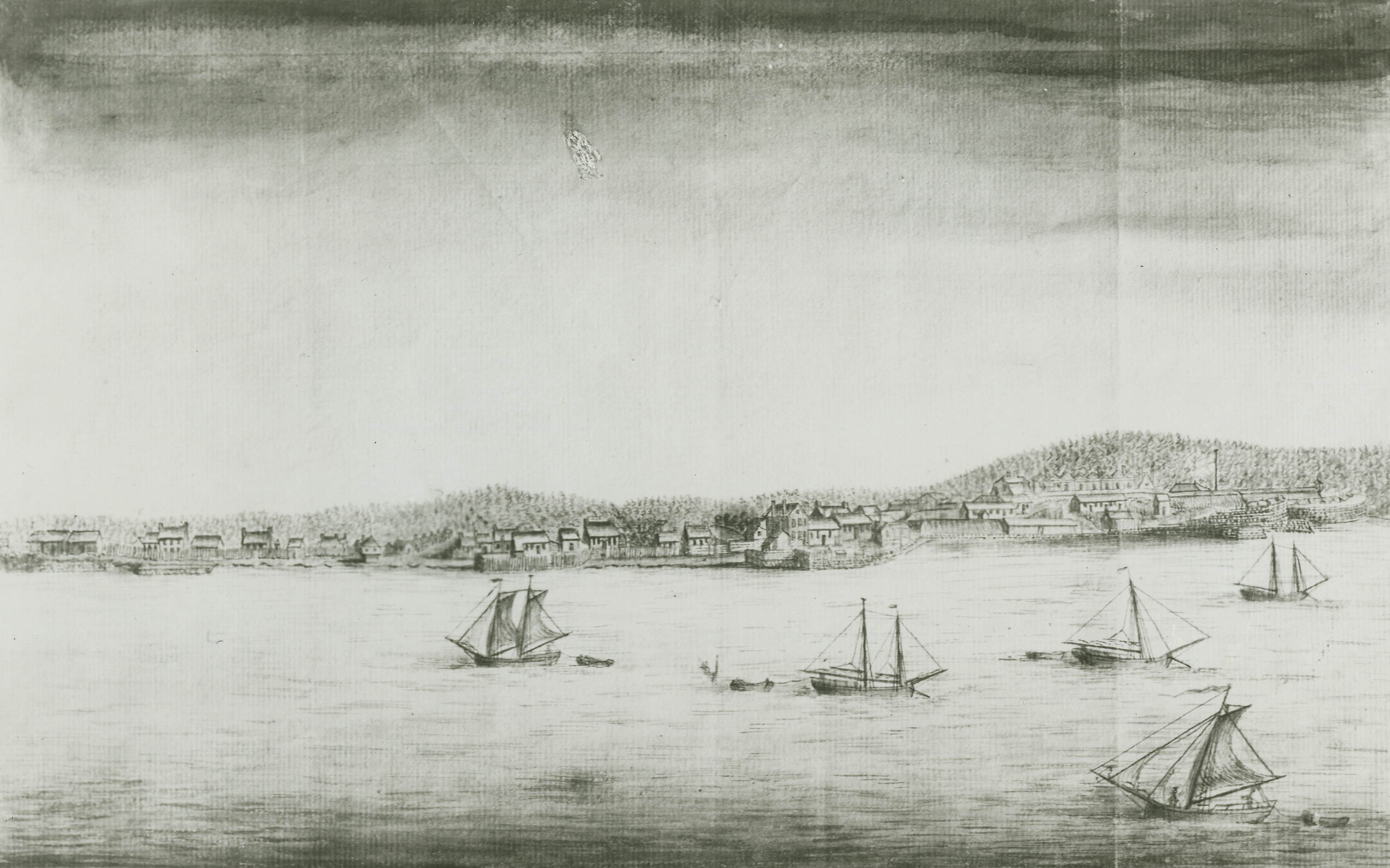
Fort Anne, Annapolis Royal by John Hamilton (c. 1753)

In 1917, Fort Anne was acquired by the Dominion Parks Branch, the predecessor of Parks Canada, and designated a national historic park, bearing the name Fort Anne National Park. Two years later, a new program of National Historic Sites was established and Fort Anne was designated a National Historic Site in 1920.

Fort Anne is sometimes referred to as Canada's "first National Historic Site" or the "first administered national historic site", because it was the first site acquired by the federal government for national historic purposes that has subsequently remained under Parks Canada administration.

== Extant buildings and features ==
- Remains of the Vauban-style French fort (1702–1708) with an underground powder magazine, a parade square well, a covert way well and earthworks
- Powder magazine (1708)
- Shoreline cribwork (1740s)
- Queen's wharf (1740s)
- Dry-stone retaining wall (1760)
- British Officers' quarters (built 1797–1799 and reconstructed 1935) now house the museum with exhibits about the fort's history and historic artifacts from the area. It was the former site of the Lieutenant Governor's house and chapel.
- Sally-port (1800s)
- Acadian cemetery
- British garrison cemetery

== Commanding officers ==
- Sir William Alexander (1629–1630)
- Sir George Home (1630–1632)
- John Doucett (1717–1726)
- Lawrence Armstrong
- Alexander Cosby
- Paul Mascarene
- Henry Daniel (military officer)
- John Handfield (1752–1755)

== Legacy ==
On 28 June 1985 Canada Post issued 'Fort Anne, N.S., circa 1763.' one of the 20 stamps in the "Forts Across Canada Series" (1983 & 1985). The stamps are perforated 12 1/2 x 13 mm and were printed by Ashton-Potter Limited based on the designs by Rolf P. Harder.

== See also ==
- Military history of Nova Scotia
- List of forts
- List of oldest buildings in Canada
