= Lower Sackville, Nova Scotia =

Lower Sackville
- Community
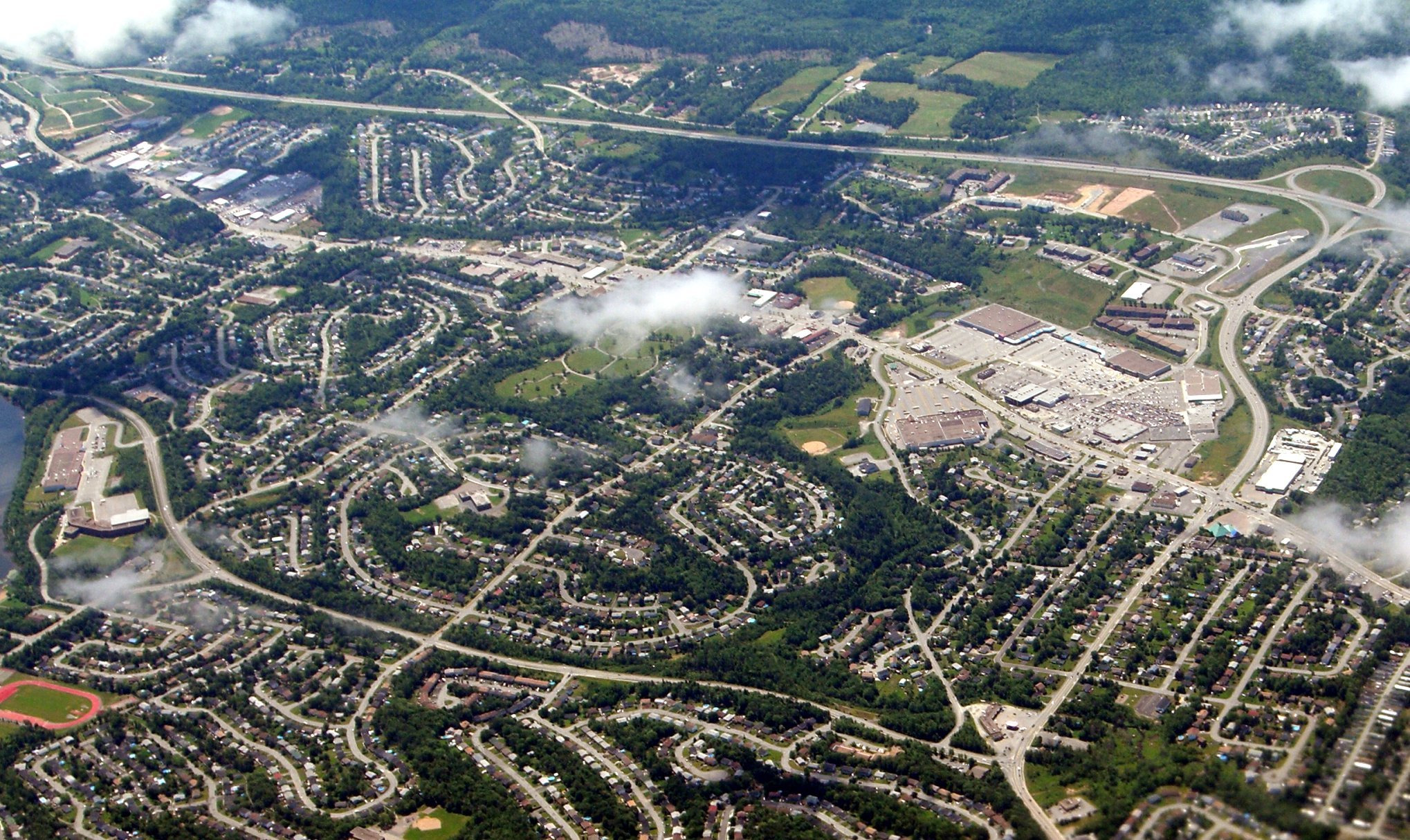
- Aerial view of Lower Sackville

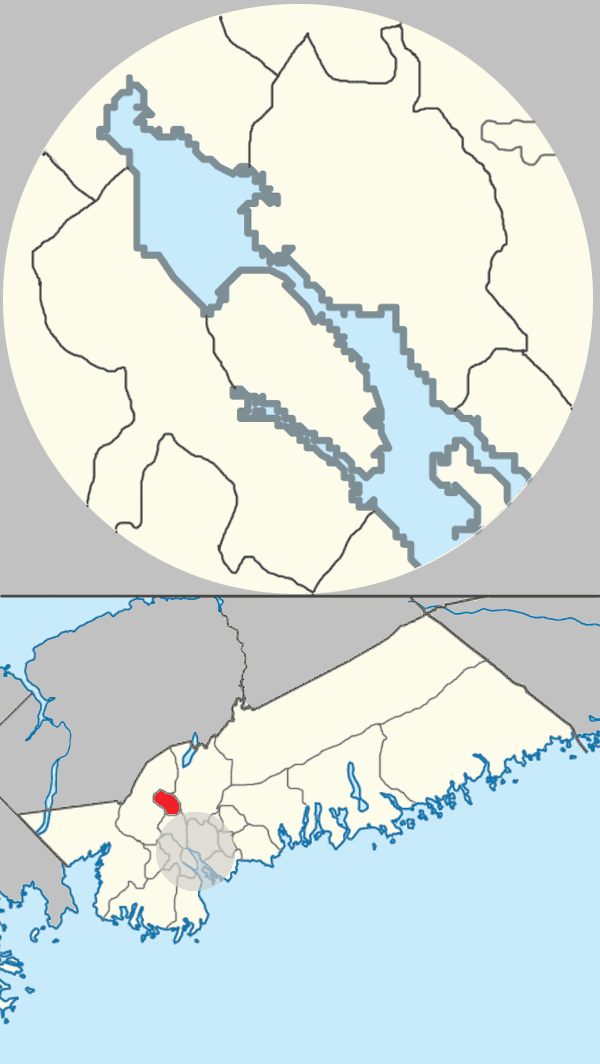
- Map of Sackville planning area in Halifax, Nova Scotia

- Location of Lower Sackville, Nova Scotia
- Coordinates: 44°46′35″N 63°41′44″W
- Country: Canada
- Province: Nova Scotia
- Municipality: Halifax
- Community: Lower Sackville
- Municipal District: District 15 (Lower Sackville)
- Founded: 1749
- Amalgamated with Halifax: April 1, 1996

Area
  - Total: 5.66 km^{2} (2.19 sq mi)

Population (2023)
  - Total: 21,749
  - Density: 2,602/km^{2} (6,740/sq mi)
- Time zone: UTC-4 (AST)
  - Summer (DST): UTC-3 (ADT)
- Canadian Postal code: B4C, B4E, B4G
- Area codes: 782, 902
- Telephone Exchange: 252, 864, 865, 869
- Website: www.sackvillenovascotia.ca

Lower Sackville is a suburban community of the Halifax Regional Municipality, Nova Scotia, Canada.

== History ==
Before European colonization in 1749, the Mi'kmaq lived in this area for thousands of years.

In August 1749, Captain John Gorham, acting on orders from Governor Edward Cornwallis to establish a military fort named Fort Sackville. (The community was named after George Germain, 1st Viscount Sackville.).

In the 1950s and 1960s it was a destination for Haligonians seeking entertainment at a drive-in cinema, a harness racing track (Sackville Downs), and an World War II bomber-plane ice cream parlour. Sackville Downs closed in 1986.

Lower Sackville experienced intensive suburban development from the 1970s onward due to new highway connections as well as a major development scheme by the Nova Scotia Housing Commission, later the Nova Scotia Department of Housing. Suburbanization contributed to a decline in agriculture in the community.

Before amalgamation into the Halifax Regional Municipality in 1996, Lower Sackville was an unincorporated part of Halifax County.

On 1 April 1996, Halifax County was dissolved and all of its places (cities, suburbs, towns, and villages) became communities of a single-tier municipality named Halifax Regional Municipality.

Today, Lower Sackville is a commuter town of Halifax home to many established businesses, parks, and places of interest.

== Geography ==
According to the 2013 Halifax Regional Municipality Urban Forest Master Plan, the community of Lower Sackville covers approximately 566 ha (1,400 acres) of land area.

Lower Sackville is east of Lucasville; north—north-east of Bedford; south-east of Middle Sackville; and south-west of Windsor Junction.

The community is located approximately 18 km (11 mi) from Downtown Dartmouth, approximately 27 km (17 mi) from Downtown Halifax, and approximately 25 km (16 mi) from Halifax Stanfield International Airport.

Some neighbourhoods of Lower Sackville are also known by their tendency to use street names starting with the same letter:

- "C" Section: Cavalier Dr, Cavendish Dr, Cartier Cres, Cabot Cres, Crimson Dr
- "L" Section: Lennox Dr, Lumsden Cres, Lynville Dr, Lydgate Dr
- "N" Section: Nordic Cres, Neilly Dr, Nappan Dr, Newcombe Dr, Nictaux Dr
- "P" Section: Polara Dr, Polara Ct, Phoenix Cres
- "Q" Section: Quaker Cres, Quinn Dr, Queens Ct
- "R" Section: Rogers Dr, Rankin Dr, Riverside Dr, Rothesay Ct
- "S" Section: Smokey Dr, Stokil Dr, Sampson Dr, Saratoga Dr, Saturn Dr, Spinner Cres, Sappire Cres

Other streets are named after the Fathers of Canadian confederation: Brown, Cartier, Chandler, Chapais, Cockburn, Coles, Dickie, Haviland, Howland, Johnson, Langevin, MacDougall, McGee, Mowat, Nelson, Pope, Shea, Steeves, Tache, Tilley, Tilloch, and Wilmot.

== Parks and recreation ==
Arenas

- Sackville Community Arena
- Sackville Sports Stadium (home of the Lakeshore Curling Club)

Community centres

- Acadia Centre
- Kinsmen Community Centre
- Sackville Heights Community Centre

Library

- Sackville Public Library

Museums

- Fultz House

Parks

- Acadia Park
- Sackville Lakes Provincial Park

Pools

- Sackville Sports Stadium

Trails

- Bedford-Sackville Connector

== Demographics ==
The only demographic information that pertains to Lower Sackville is provided by Halifax Regional Council, and pertains to District 15 (Lower Sackville) which shows 32,726 people living within its boundaries.

== Transportation ==
The community is located northwest of the Halifax-Dartmouth urban core. Highway 101, Highway 102, Route 354, and Trunk 1 (called Sackville Drive within Lower Sackville) are highways that connect the community to the rest of the urban area, or beyond.

Lower Sackville is serviced by many Halifax Transit routes, although infrequent routes to central Halifax. The agency operates two transit terminals in the community: Cobequid Terminal in the south, and Sackville Terminal in the north.
