= Fultz House =

(Bennett Daniel) Fultz House
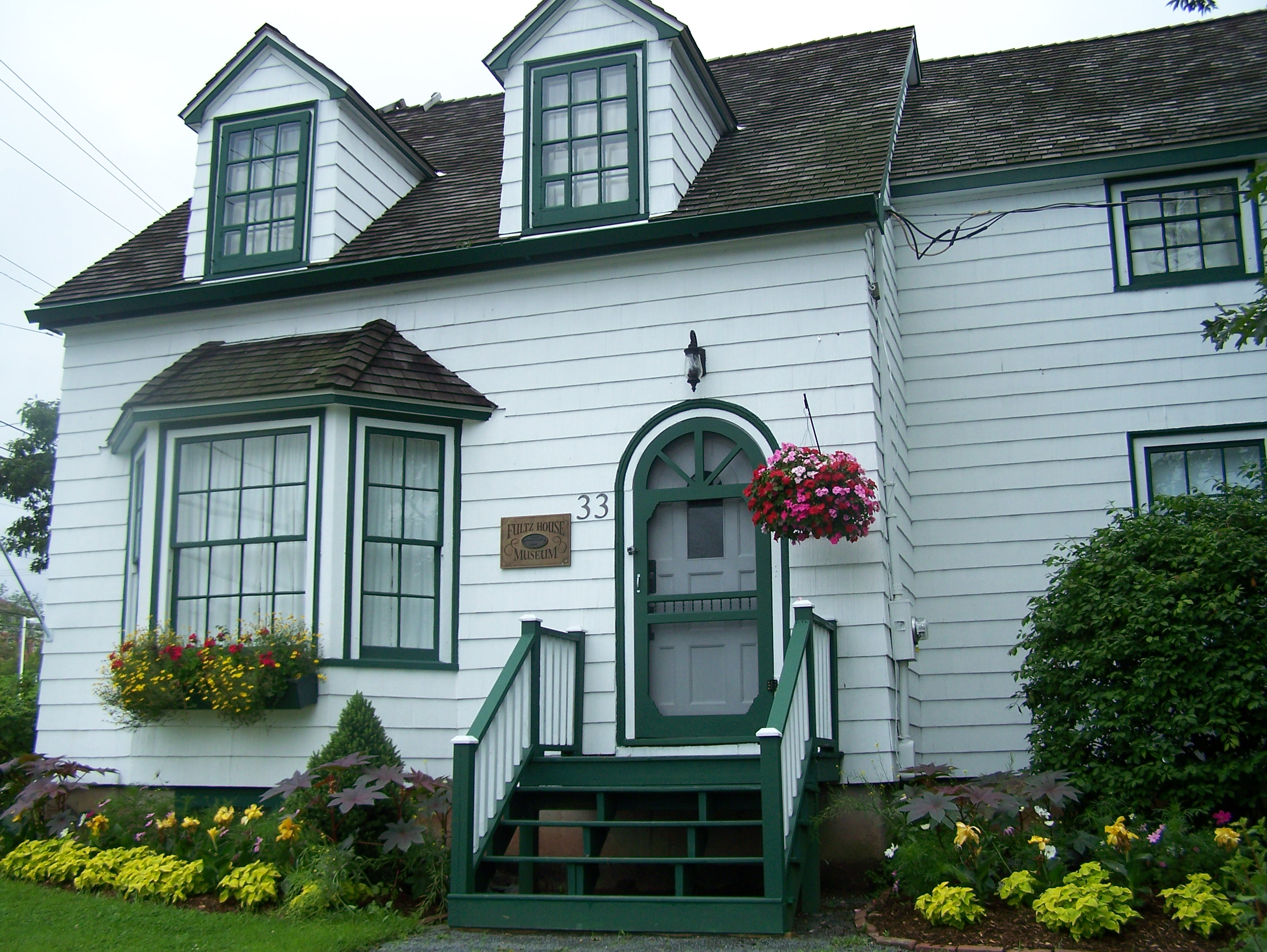
- Fultz House Museum

General information
- Location: 33 Sackville Drive, Lower Sackville, Nova Scotia
- Coordinates: 44.752804°N 63.664922°W
- Construction started: 1863
- Completed: 1865
- Owner: Fultz Corner Restoration Society

Website
- http://www.fultzhouse.ca/

The Bennett Daniel Fultz House is one of the earliest houses in Lower Sackville, Nova Scotia and the community's only museum. It is located on its original land, on the corner of the "Great Roads" leading from Halifax to Truro and to the Annapolis Valley.

== History ==
Lower Sackville was officially created with Fort Sackville in 1749, under Captain John Gorham. The first land grant in the area was given to Colonel Joseph Scott, of the Scott Manor House, located in what is now Bedford. The Manor was completed in the 1770s.

The history of the Fultz Family begins in 1751, when a Johann Fultz left Germany, boarded the Speedwell, and traveled to Halifax. He then (according to records) made his way to Louisbourg. Before its fall in 1758, Johann Fultz, and his wife, whom he married while in Nova Scotia, Elizabeth, brought two children into the world.

One of them, Anthony Fultz, petitioned the Crown in 1809 for land in Sackville after having received some from his father's will in 1801. In 1812 Anthony was successful, and purchased 150 acres (61 ha) of land. Almost immediately afterwards, Fultz's Twelve Mile House began operating on the corner of the "Great Roads", serving as a rest stop for horse-drawn carriages traveling to and from Halifax. The inn was run by Anthony's son, William. The Inn included a 40-by-25-foot (12.2 by 7.6 m) ballroom. It was a popular stop for George Ramsay, 9th Earl of Dalhousie during his period as Governor of Nova Scotia (1816 to 1820). The inn itself burned down in 1890. In spite of this tragedy, the Fultz family persevered.

== Fultz House History ==
In 1858, William's nephew Bennett Daniel Fultz purchased the land opposite the Twelve Mile Inn from his cousin, William Beresford Fultz. In 1863, he began building what is now colloquially known as the Fultz House. Bennett lived in the house from 1865 with his wife Mary and their eight children.

The house was significantly modified prior to the 1900s, with the addition of a summer kitchen and second floor. Bennett and Mary served as masters of a post-office they ran from their kitchen. They died in 1910 and 1928, respectively.

Jane Emily Fultz, the sixth child of Bennett and Mary retired to the family home after the death of her father. When she died in 1947, the connection between the house and the family had finally been broken; the house moved into the possession of another family.

=== The Fultz House Museum ===
In 1979, the Provincial Government of Nova Scotia acquired Fultz House and the surrounding land. Preparations were made to expand the "Great Roads" intersection in order to facilitate traffic. In November of that year, six Sackville community groups joined to form the Fultz Corner Restoration Society; among them were the Sackville Heritage Society (represented by Bob Harvey, a councilor with HRM District 20 today), a garden club, and a sorority. In 1980, the plans for demolition of the house were put on hold, and the house and property were leased to the society that August.

The museum opened during the months of July and August in 1981 and was officially deemed the Fultz House Museum at a grand opening on Canada Day, 1982. Since then, it has served as a gathering place for teas, Canada Day celebrations, and other community events. Descendants of the Fultz family continue to be involved in museum activities.

In 1988, the W.J. Grace cooperage was moved to the site; in 1995, the blacksmith's forge and tools that once belonged to A. J. Smeltzer were moved to the site. The entirety of the Fultz House site became the property of the society in 1990, and in 2008, the society was granted additional land in the form of 17 Sackville Drive, hand-delivered by Premier Rodney MacDonald.

This prized community museum is open from 10am-5pm on all days of the week throughout the months of July and August. Through provincial and federal funding the museum is able to keep history alive through the employment of a summer staff made up of post-secondary students. Admission to the museum is free of charge.

== See also ==
- List of historic places in Halifax, Nova Scotia
