= Jason Nett =

Jason Nett is a Canadian composer, producer, and guitarist born in New Westminster, British Columbia. He was the resident composer for the Vancouver Island Symphony. In 2022, Jason Nett's orchestral arrangement of composer Modest Mussorgsky's piano suite "Pictures at an Exhibition" created for VISO's "The Pictures Project", premiered at The Port Theatre in Nanaimo BC. He also works as a music producer and performs internationally.

Jason Nett's commissioned works are frequently performed in Vancouver's "classical" community by orchestras, chamber ensembles, choirs etc.(listed below). Nett fuses the classical styles of composers like Bach and Beethoven with influences from Rock and Jazz. Nett's music integrates an emphasis on vibrant rhythm in many of his works. About his Vancouver Island commissioned work, Sonic Blue, Jason Nett says, "The piece is very up-tempo, very rhythmic, something you would find in blues-rock guitar today..."

One of his largest works is the opera "Legends," which was written for the Vancouver Island Symphony's Youth and Education concert series. The show "tell[s] the story of the last 150 years on central Vancouver Island, including the contributions of First Nations, Chinese immigrants and Scottish and English coal miners." The production was awarded a Vancouver Celebration Grant for its contribution to the community.

Nett's latest work is a ballet titled "The Same River Twice." This piece was performed, in Newfoundland, in Gros Morne's Summer Music 2010 program in a show called "Splash!" organized by David Maggs. The show took place "in a dory floating between the two banks of the Glynmill Inn pond near where the stream empties into it," featuring keyboard, cello, percussion and voice. Beyond the music was "a series of dancers moving to choreography arranged by Amy Andrews," "a theatrical element played out by local actor Jim Parsons" and supported by an "audio technician Louis McDonald and lighting guru Harry Tibbo."

== Selected works ==
Ballet
The Same River Twice – keyboard, cello, percussion, voice, Gros Morne Summer Music

Orchestral
Sol – full orchestra, Vancouver Symphony
Symphonia Brevis – full orchestra, Vancouver Symphony
Sonic Blue – full orchestra, Vancouver Island Symphony
Tungstein – amplified orchestra w/electric guitar soloist, Plastic Acid Orchestra

Opera
Legends – full orchestra with singers, Vancouver Island Symphony

Choral
Native Spirit Song – SATB, British Columbia Boy's Choir

Chamber
Who We Really Are – brass ensemble, Vertical Orchestra
In the Mouth of Madness – chamber orchestra, Aventa Ensemble
Trio #1 and 2 – guitar, violin, flute, Jason Nett Ensemble

Guitar Quartets
The Journey I, II, III – Vancouver Guitar Quartet
Road Rage – Jason Nett Guitar Quartet
Excerpts From A Diary #1 I, II, III – Jason Nett Guitar Quartet
Revolution – Jason Nett Guitar Quartet
When I Think of You – Jason Nett Guitar Quartet
Searching for the Devine – Jason Nett Guitar Quartet
O’Canada – Jason Nett Guitar Quartet
