= Fort Sackville =

Fort Sackville may refer to:

- Fort Sackville (Nova Scotia), Canada
- Fort Sackville, a fort of Vincennes, Indiana, United States
