= Bedford, Nova Scotia =

District of Halifax, Nova Scotia, Canada

Bedford
- Administrative district and former town
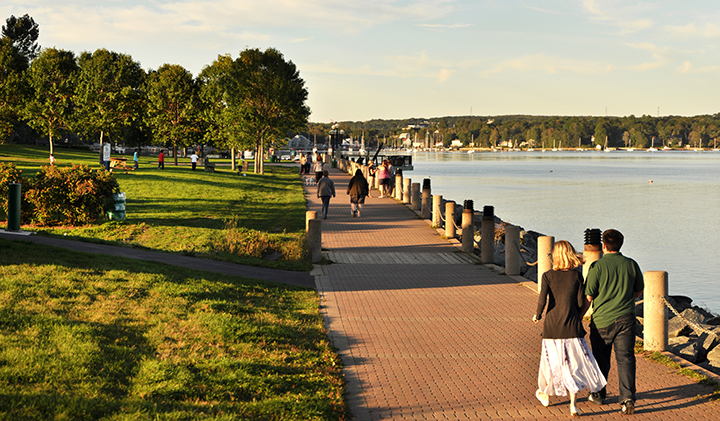
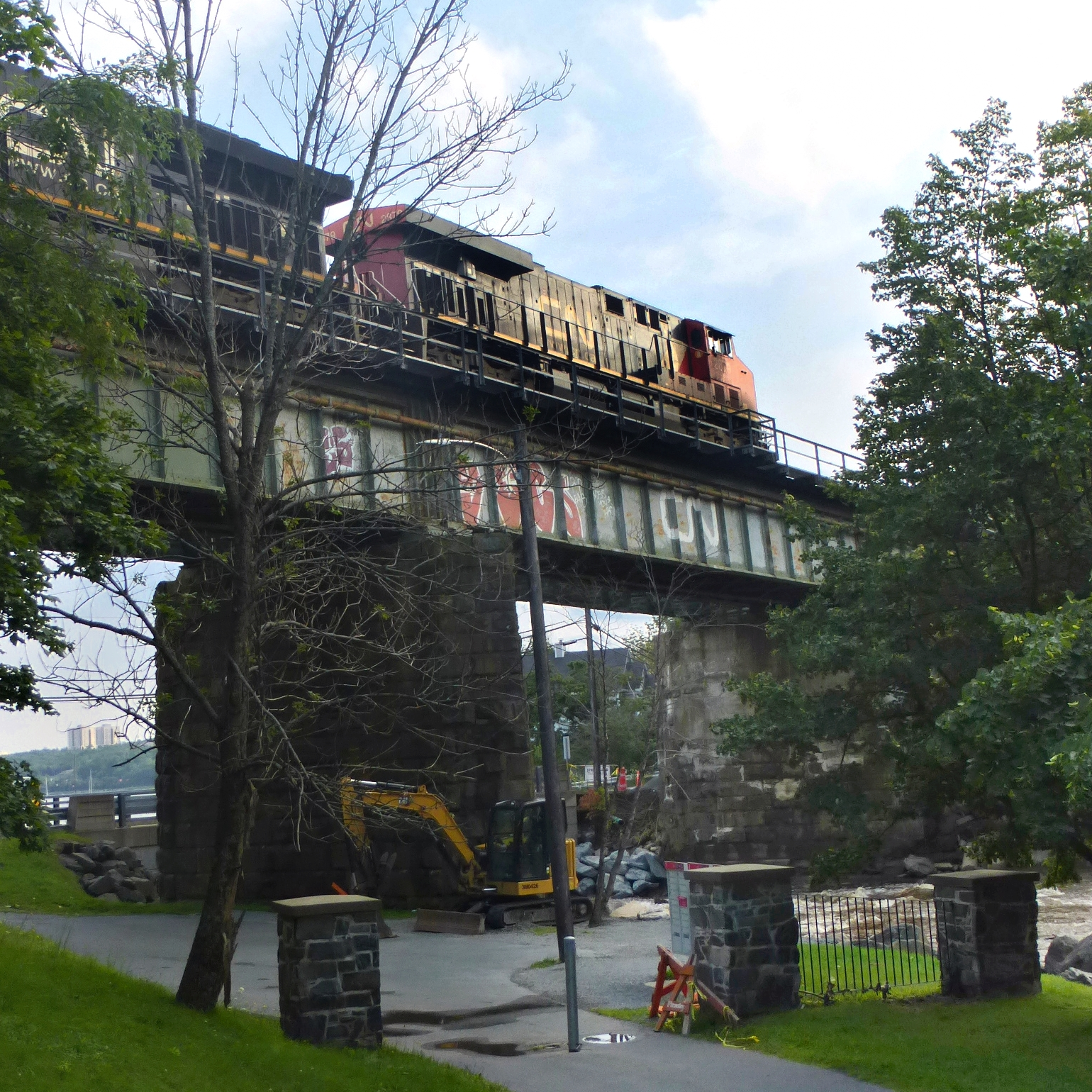
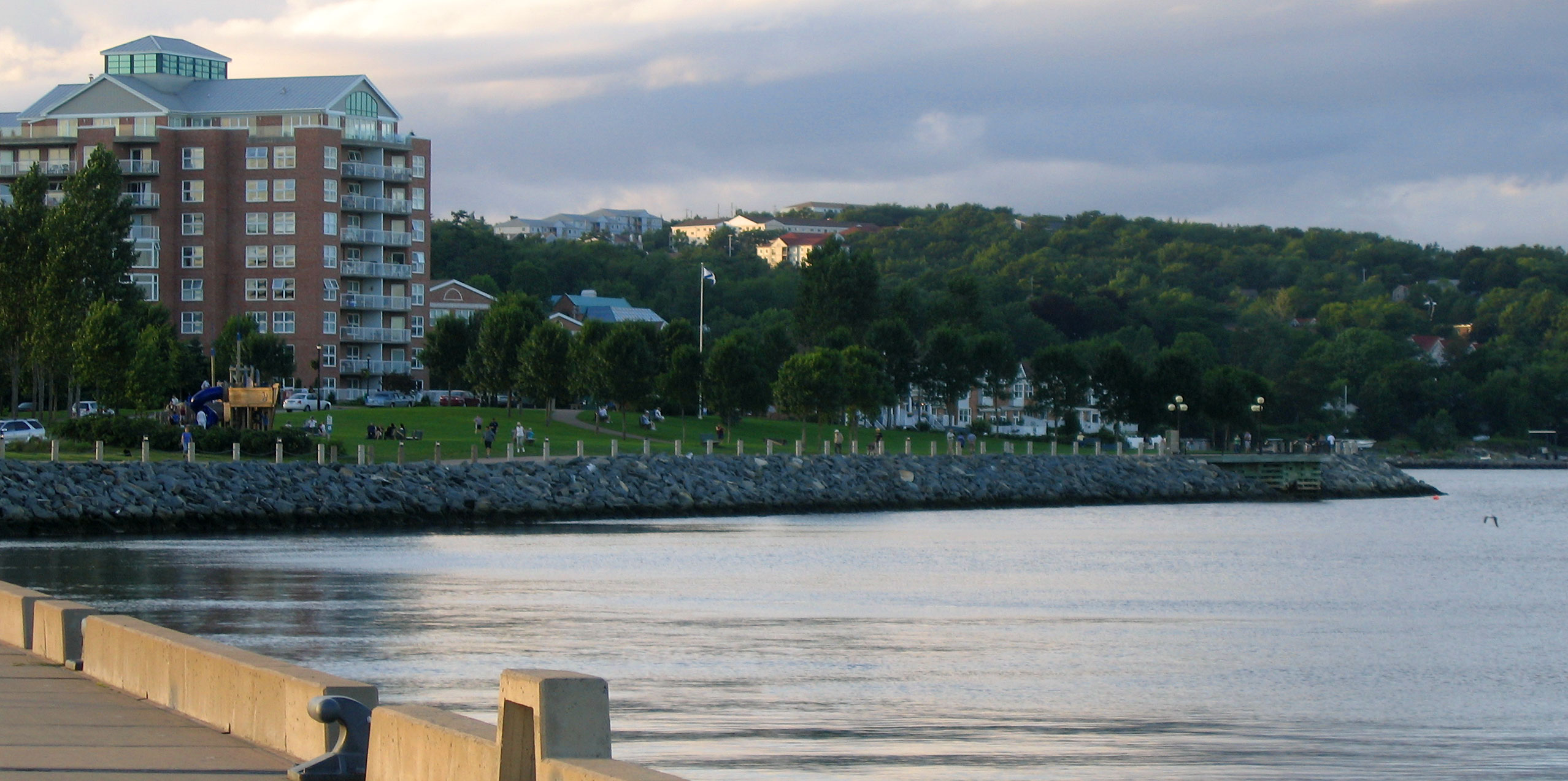
- From top, left to right: DeWolf Park, CN Bridge over Fish Hatchery Park, The Bedford Waterfront
- Nickname: "B-Town”
- Location of Bedford, Nova Scotia
- Coordinates: 44°43′56″N 63°39′24″W
- Country: Canada
- Province: Nova Scotia
- Municipality: Halifax Regional Municipality
- Founded: 1750
- Incorporated: July 1, 1980 (Township)
- Amalgamation: April 1, 1996

Government
  - Councillor: Jean St-Amand
  - MPs, and MLAs: Braedon Clark (L); Lena Diab (L); Tim Outhit (PC); Damian Stoilov (PC)

Area
  - Total: 39.79 km^{2} (15.36 sq mi)
- Highest elevation: 107 m (351 ft)
- Lowest elevation: 0 m (0 ft)

Population (2021)
  - Total: 36,354
  - Density: 914/km^{2} (2,370/sq mi)
- Time zone: UTC-4 (AST)
  - Summer (DST): UTC-3 (ADT)
- Postal code span: B4A, B4B
- Area codes: 782, 902

Bedford (2021 population: 36,354) is a former town and now district of Halifax, Nova Scotia, Canada. It is situated on the north west shore of the Bedford Basin in the central area of the municipality. It borders the neighbouring communities of Hammonds Plains to the west, Sackville to the north, Dartmouth to the east, and mainland Halifax to the south. Bedford was named in honour of John Russell, 4th Duke of Bedford, Secretary of State for the colonies in 1749.

== History ==
The area of Bedford has evidence of Indigenous peoples dating back thousands of years. Petroglyphs are found at Bedford Petroglyphs National Historic Site. The Bedford area is known as Kwipek to the Mi'kmaq.

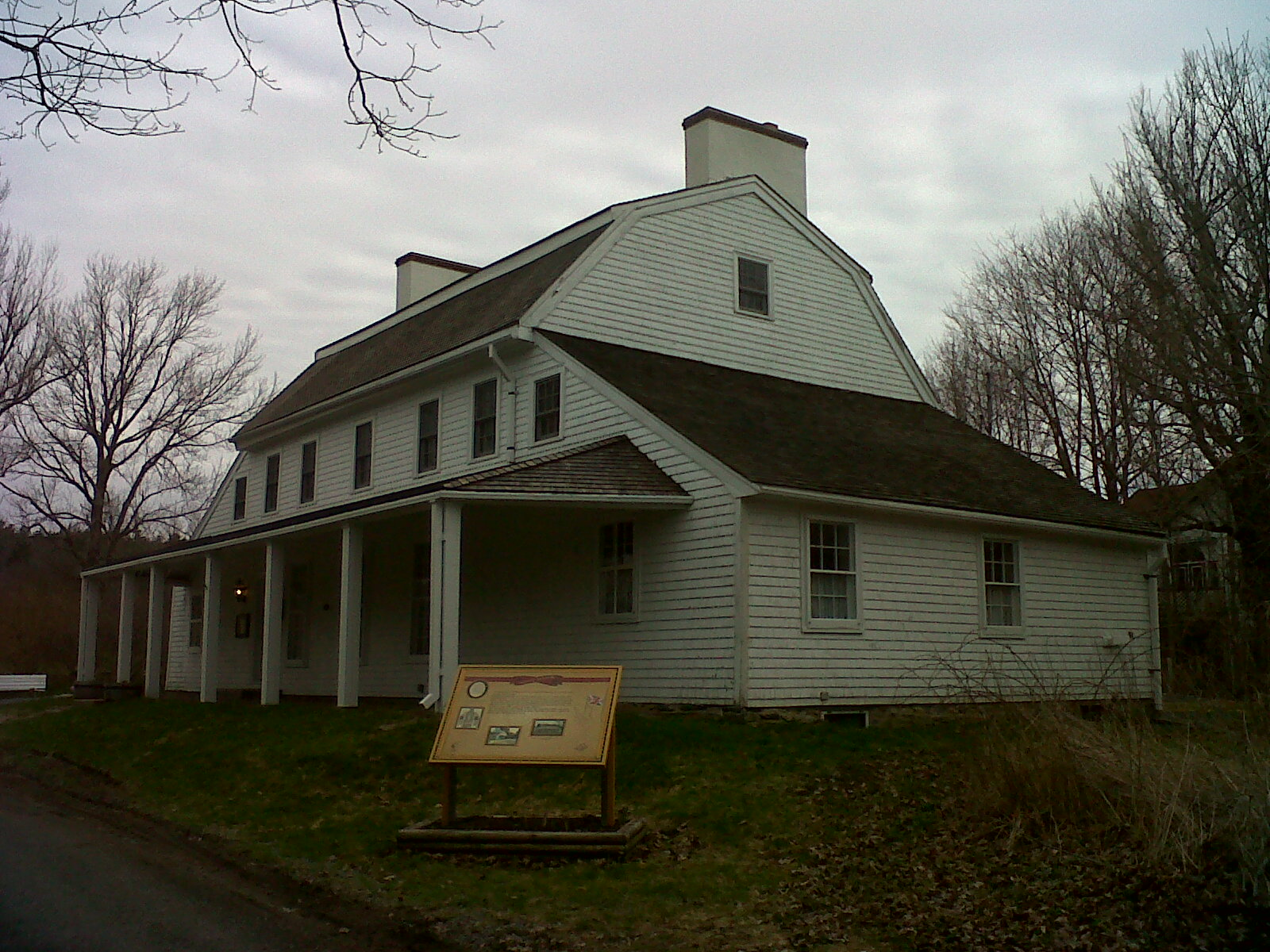
Scott Manor House (built 1770)

On 21 July 1749, Father Le Loutre's War began when Edward Cornwallis arrived to establish Halifax with 13 transports. The British quickly began to build other settlements. To guard against the Acadians, the French, and the Mi'kmaq, British fortifications were erected in Halifax (1749), Bedford (Fort Sackville) (1749), Dartmouth (1750), Lunenburg (1753) and Lawrencetown (1754).

The history of Bedford began when Governor Edward Cornwallis organised his men and began the construction of a road leading to Minas Basin on the Bay of Fundy after establishing the garrison at Halifax. To protect it, he hired John Gorham and his Rangers to erect a fort on the shore of Bedford Basin. It was named Fort Sackville after Lionel Sackville, 1st Duke of Dorset. The area around the fort became known as Sackville until the mid-1850s, when it became Bedford.

In 1752, among the first to receive a large land grant was military officer George Scott in the Fort Sackville area. Scott later participated in the Expulsion of the Acadians, specifically the St. John River Campaign (1758). His brother, Joseph, was paymaster at the Halifax Garrison in the 1760s, received two grants in 1759 and 1765. And built Scott Manor House in 1770.

Anthony Holland established the Acadian Paper Mill on the Basin around 1819 to provide paper to produce the Halifax newspaper Acadian Recorder.

When the railway went through the station named Millview, Moirs, Son and Co., a Halifax chocolate manufacturer, moved a part of the factory to Bedford. The Moirs Mill generating station built in the early 1930s to supply the electricity required to run the factory.

A map of the Bedford area of HRM.

On 1 July 1980, Bedford was incorporated as a town. The Town only had two Mayors from 1 July 1980 until 1 April 1996; the first Mayor of Bedford was Francene Cosman. The second and final Mayor of Bedford was Peter J. Kelly. Peter J. Kelly would later serve as Mayor of the Municipality of Halifax, from 2000 to 2012.

On 1 April 1996, Halifax County was dissolved and all of its places (cities, suburbs, towns, and villages) were turned into communities of a single-tier municipality named Halifax Regional Municipality. Subsequently, Bedford was turned into a community within the new Municipality of Halifax.

== Geography ==
Bedford is approximately 18 km (11 mi) from Downtown Halifax. Bedford covers 3,979 hectares (39.79 km^{2}) of land area. As Bedford is quite centralized in the municipality its borders are formed by the community boundaries it shares with its neighbours. To the north are the communities of Lower Sackville, Lakeview and Waverley and Dartmouth are to the east, Halifax and Timberlea to the south and finally Hammonds Plains to the west.

The Town of Bedford before amalgamation.

Topographically, the area is situated over bedrock, with a high proportion of rockland and exposed bedrock ridges, dotted with many lakes and wetlands. In these ridge terrains, soils are typically dry, shallow, and coarse, and often degraded by a history of repeated wildfire.

Bedford has several large lakes including: Marsh Lake, Sandy Lake, Kearney Lake and Paper Mill Lake, the latter being the secondary tributary of the Bedford Basin.

The main tributary of the Bedford Basin estuary is the Sackville River. The river has been heavily affected by ongoing development within its watershed and a chronic loss of riparian zones along its shores, especially in downtown Bedford, where the impervious surfaces of shopping centres and strip malls dominate the landscape. The secondary tributary of the Basin flows Paper Mill Lake then through Moirs Mill Pond adjacent to a commercial shopping district at the intersection of the Bedford Highway and Hammonds Plains Road. Both areas are composed almost entirely of impervious surfaces where contaminated stormwater and surface runoff are unable to permeate into the ground and instead flow directly into the Bedford Basin.

The developed area of Bedford’s shore line is mainly long the Bedford Bay portion of the basin. It consists of a public waterfront boardwalk through a 1 km portion of DeWolf Park and follows along to Lions Park and along Shore Drive. Its eastern shore consists of a "blast buffer zone" that surrounds Canadian Forces Ammunition Depot Bedford; this is the Royal Canadian Navy’s weapons magazine for its Atlantic fleet.

== Culture ==
=== Traditions ===
Bedford Days has occurred annually at the end of June and beginning of July for almost 50 years. Currently, most of the events take place at DeWolf Park. There is an opening celebration, a Canada Day celebration, free pancake-breakfast, dog show, Kids' Extravaganza, Kids' Triathlon, Movies in the Park, the Rubber Duck Dash, and the Scott Manor House Tea Party.

The Light Up Bedford Parade is an annual parade that has been held since 1998 and takes place on the Sunday following the Light Up Halifax Parade, which usually is mid-November. It runs along the Bedford Highway from Bedford Place Mall and ends at DeWolf Park. At the park there is Christmas carol singing, contests-and-prizes, and a hot chocolate stand. At the conclusion of the parade, a Christmas Tree is lit. In addition to bringing the community together to celebrate the beginning of the Christmas season, the parade serves as a fundraiser for the Turkey Club Society—which raises funds to ensure residents of Municipality of Halifax are able to provide a Christmas dinner for their families.

== Demographics ==
Although a well-established community, Bedford has not had demographic information released from the 2006, 2011, 2016, and the 2021 Canadian Censuses.

Historical population
Year	Pop.	±%
1981	6,777	—
1986	8,010	+18.2%
1991	11,618	+45.0%
1996	13,638	+17.4%
2001	16,102	+18.1%
From 1996 onward, Bedford became a community of the Municipality of Halifax; Source:
