= Greenvale School =

Former public school in Dartmouth, Nova Scotia

Coordinates: 44.6692°N 63.5649°W

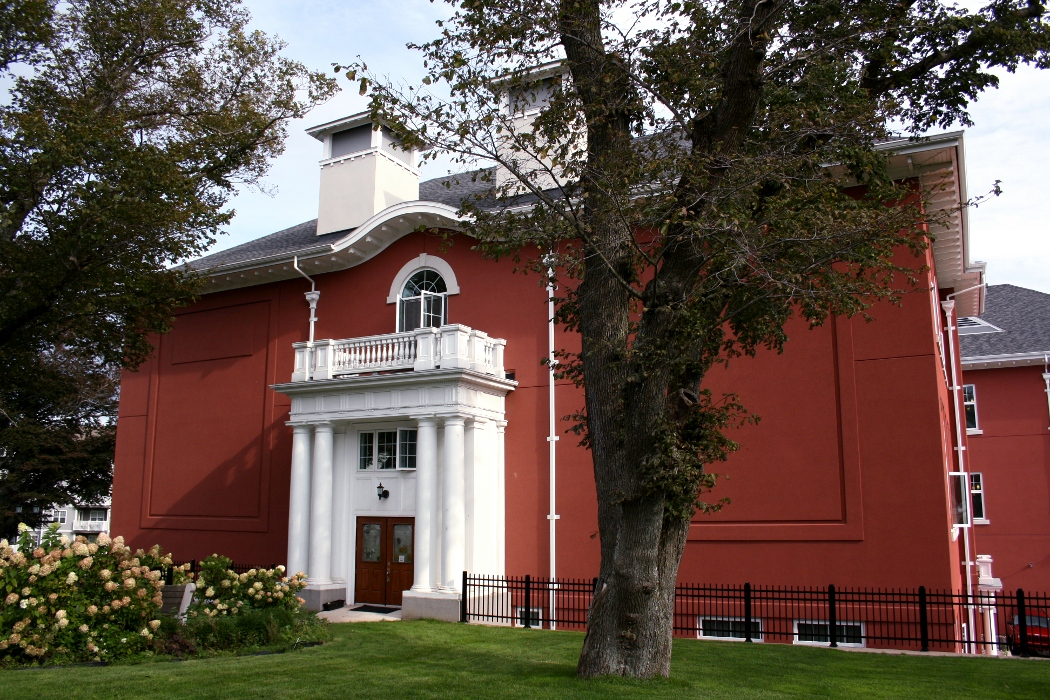
- Greenvale School building (photo c. 21st century)

Location
- 130 Ochterloney Street; Dartmouth; Nova Scotia; Canada

Information
- Type: Kindergarten to Secondary school
- Established: 1891 (wooden), 1915 (brick)
- Closed: 1980
- Principal: Various (see article)
- Grades: K–12
- Gender: Co-educational (from 1891)
- Campus: Rural
- Area: Dartmouth
- Architect: Andrew R. Cobb (1915)
- Architectural style: Beaux-Arts
- Designations

Nova Scotia Heritage Property Act
- Type: Municipally Registered Property
- Designated: July 21, 1988

Greenvale School was a Canadian public school located in Dartmouth, Nova Scotia.

== History ==
"Greenvale," the former property of David Falconer in Dartmouth, Nova Scotia, was listed for sale in 1889 after his death. Greenvale School, an educational institution, was built by John T. Walker on the same site and opened on May 1, 1891.

The early teachers included Vice Principal Miss E. Hume, Miss M. Hamilton, Miss B. Hume, and Miss J. Findlay.

Plans for an addition were introduced in 1894, and by October, Greenvale School's second storey—serving grades 4 and 5 and the high school—was completed. The wooden building housed nine classrooms, among them domestic science and kindergarten. Canada's earliest kindergarten class was established at Greenvale School.

The original Greenvale School, Dartmouth's largest at the time, was destroyed by fire in January 1914, displacing 459 students. As a result of the Greenvale fire, other schools had to adjust their teaching staff and session schedules. The Board of School Commissioners in Dartmouth approved the construction of its first brick school buildings.

The new brick school, built in 1915, was a five-storey Beaux Arts Revival-style structure by prominent local architect Andrew R. Cobb. This was among the first two Dartmouth schools not constructed of wood. It was formally opened on May 10, 1915. Speeches were given by a number of prominent citizens interested in schoolwork, the chairman and members of the school board, and the mayor and members of the town council. At the time, it was one of the most modern schools in Nova Scotia.

After being damaged in the 1917 Halifax Explosion, Greenvale was promptly repaired and reopened. Alongside Edgemere House, it served as one of two temporary mortuary sites for Dartmouth residents killed in the explosion.

The building was transferred to the former City of Dartmouth by the Dartmouth School Board in February 1987. It was listed in the Canadian Register of Historic Places on July 21, 1988.

Greenvale School was converted into a multiple-unit building known as the Greenvale Lofts.

== Principals ==
Past principals of Greenvale School:

- W. C. Stapleton

== See also ==
- List of historic places in Halifax, Nova Scotia
