= Scott Manor House =

Historic house in Nova Scotia, Canada

Coordinates: 44.7293°N 63.6602°W

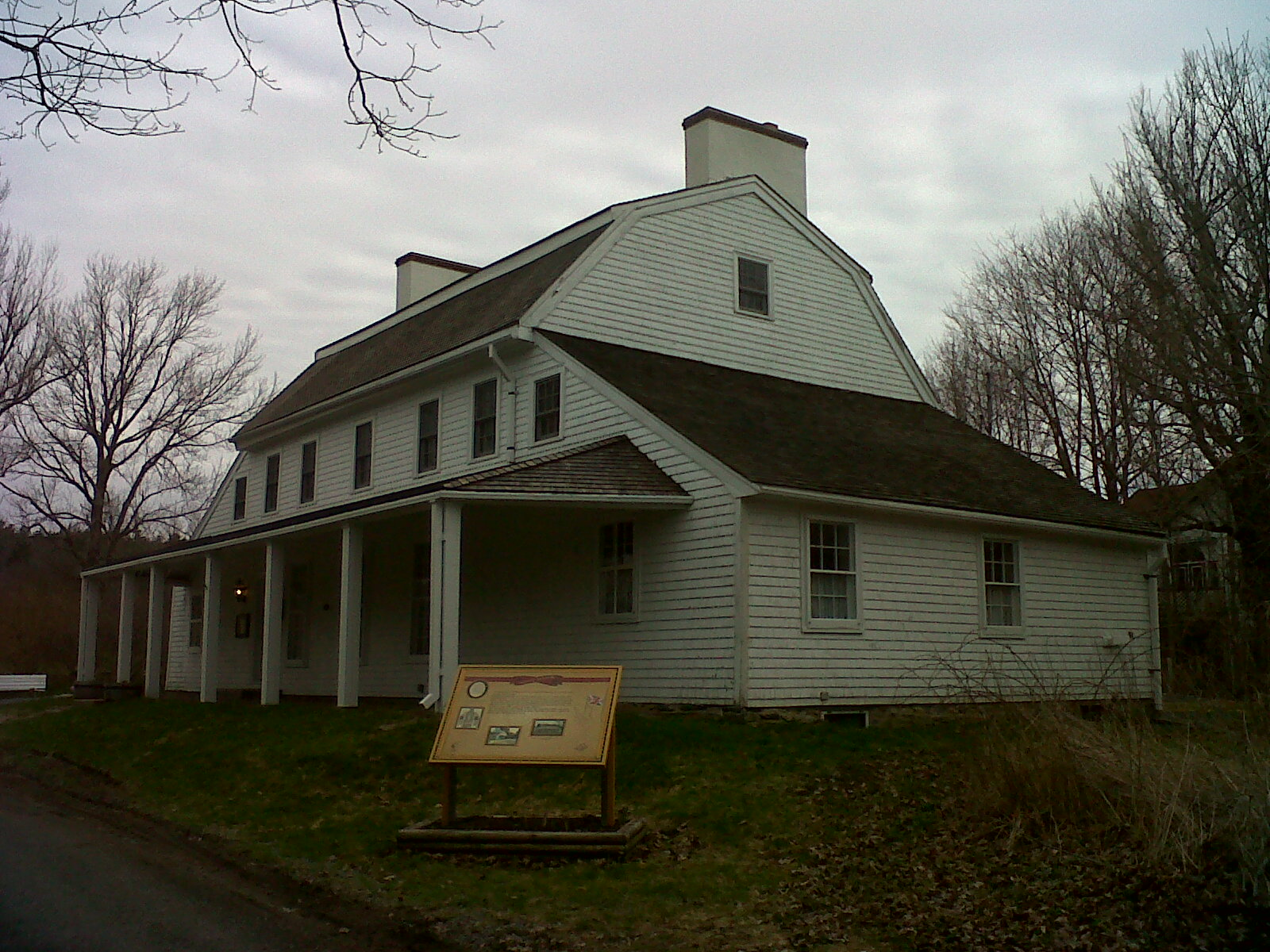
Scott Manor House (built between 1769 and 1772 on the land of Captain George Scott adjacent to Fort Sackville)

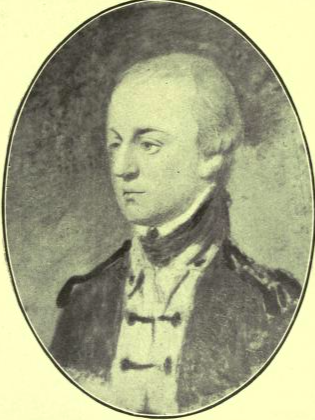
Lt. Col Joseph Scott, Nova Scotia

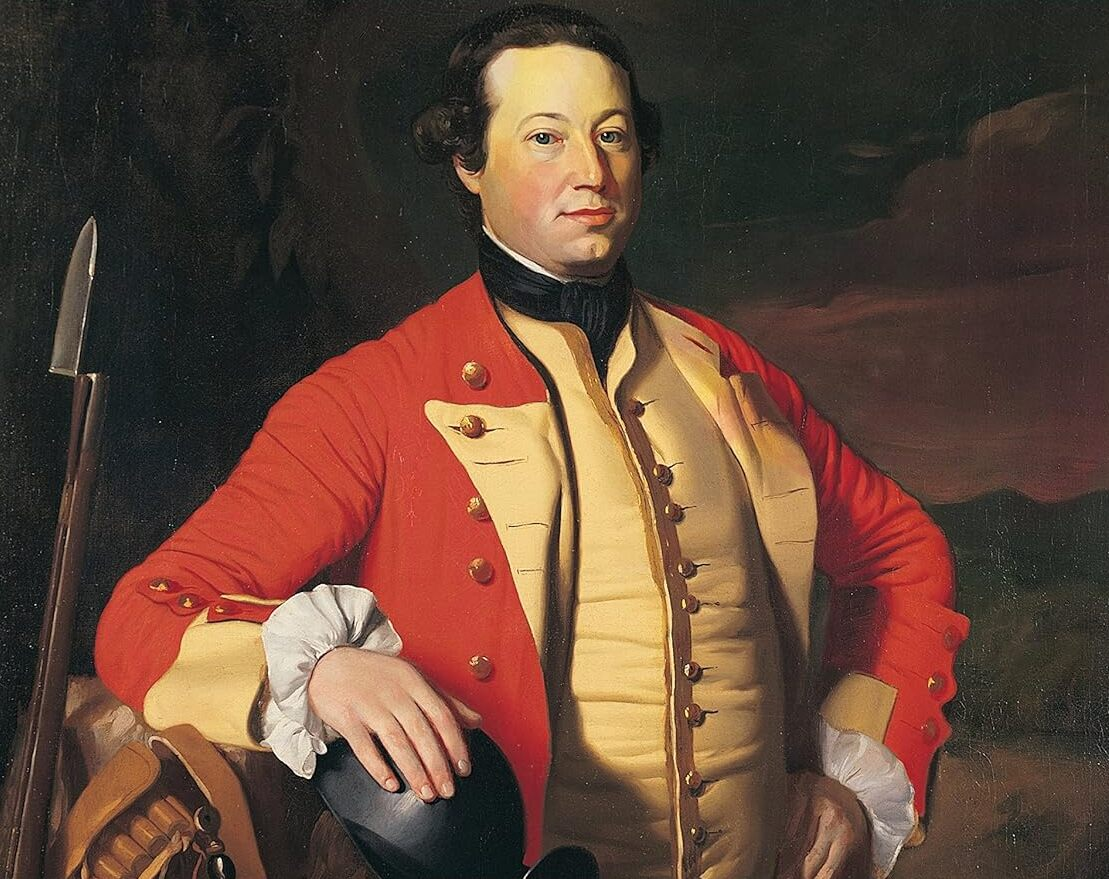
Captain George Scott owned property on which his brother Joseph Scott built the Scott Manor House

Scott Manor House was built sometime between 1769 and 1772 and is now a museum in Bedford, Nova Scotia. It is the second oldest house in the Halifax Regional Municipality, after the Morris House, and was built by Joseph Scott on the land once owned by his brother Captain George Scott. The house was built next to Fort Sackville, which was under the command of Joseph Scott (1760).

== See also ==
- History of the Halifax Regional Municipality
- List of historic places in Halifax, Nova Scotia
- List of oldest buildings and structures in Halifax, Nova Scotia
- Fultz House

== Other reading ==
- Brian Cuthertson and Gillis Architects. Joseph Scott and the Scott Manor House. Halifax Regional Municipality. 2002
- Bedford’s buried history. Chronicle Herald. 24 May 2013
- Scott Manor House - Canada's Historic Places
- Scott Manor House - Official Site
