= Andrew R. Cobb =

Canadian-American architect (1876–1943)

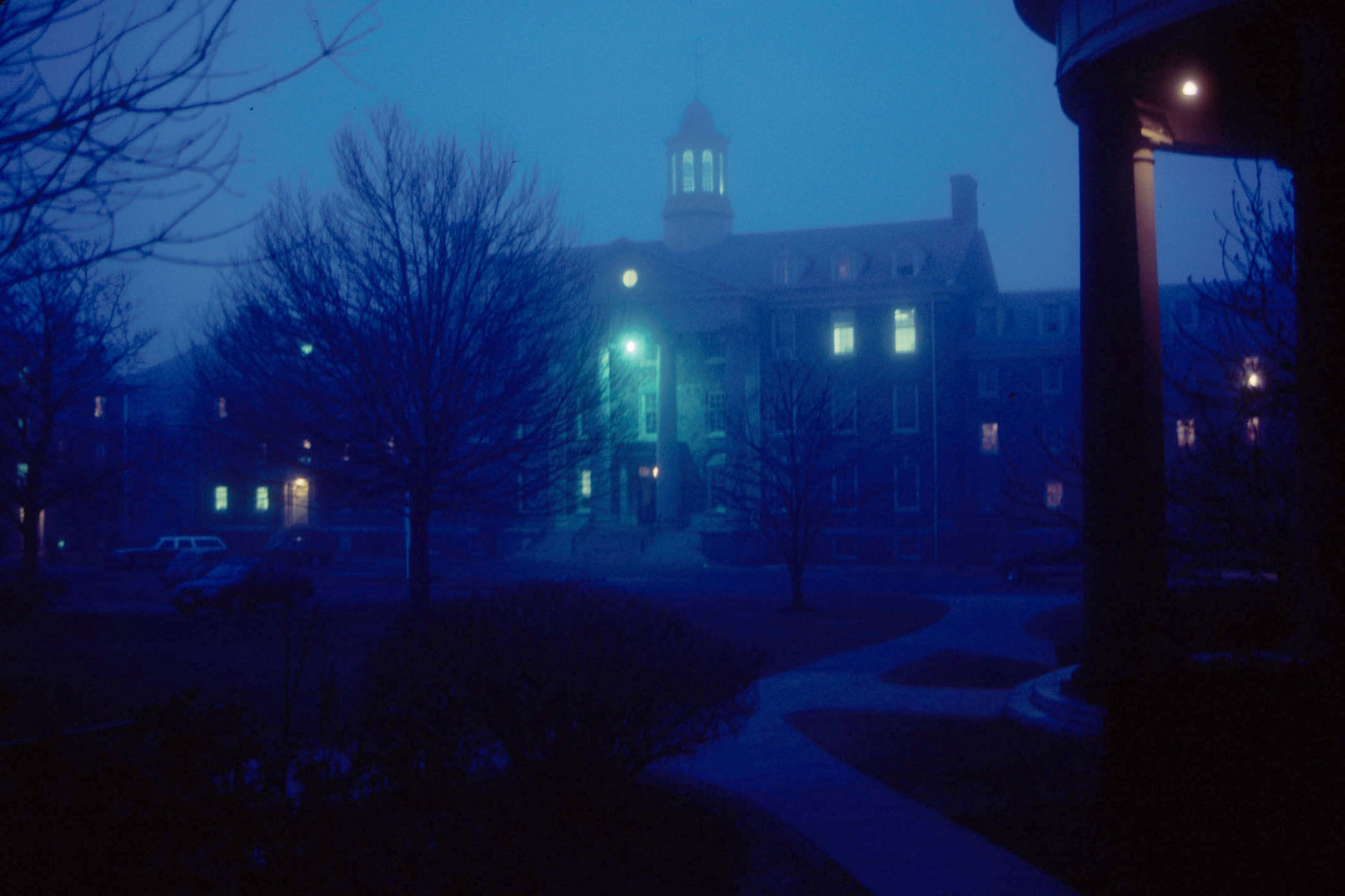
The Arts and Administration building at King's College, Halifax. The structure was designed by Andrew Cobb in 1928.

Andrew Randall Cobb, ARCA, FRIBA (13 June 1876 – 2 June 1943) was a Canadian-American architect based in Nova Scotia.

In his day, Cobb was one of the most renowned architects in Atlantic Canada. He is one of the first élèves of the École des Beaux Arts to practice architecture in the region and his homes and buildings are famous for their exterior aesthetic appeal, comfortable interiors, well-crafted details and built-in furniture.

Andrew Cobb was born in Brooklyn, New York, son of an American father and a Canadian mother. He was 14 when his father died, and he moved to his mother's home province of Nova Scotia, settling in Greenwich, Kings County. He completed his schooling in nearby Horton Academy and later attended Acadia University. He won a scholarship to the School of Architecture at the Massachusetts Institute of Technology where he earned BSc and MSc degrees (1904).

He worked in Cleveland, Ohio for the next few years, contributing to the design of, among other projects, the Cuyahoga County Court House. He spent 1907, 1908, and 1909 in Paris where he attended the École des Beaux Arts. During his vacations, he "toured the Continent", spending time in Italy, France and England studying architecture.

Returning to Halifax from Paris he entered into a partnership with Halifax-born architect Sydney P. Dumaresq. The partnership was dissolved in 1912 by which time both men had established sufficient reputations to strike out on their own.

He worked mainly in Nova Scotia and was busy until he was killed at the age of 68. He and three others were killed instantly when the city bus on which they were travelling was struck by a car.

Cobb's work and career was documented by Halifax historian Janet Kitz in a 2014 biography, Andrew Cobb: Architect and Artist.

== Major works ==
- Dingle Tower, Halifax, 1911 (with Sydney Dumaresque)
- Dalhousie University's Studley Campus and the University of King's College campus (1913–1928) plans and many of the buildings
  - Dalhousie University's Studley Campus buildings include the Science Building, 1913–15; MacDonald Memorial Library, 1914–15; Shirreff Hall Women's Residence, 1920; Arts Building, 1921–22; Medical Science Laboratory, 1921–22; Provincial Archives Building (now the Chase Building), 1929; Gymnasium Building, 1931.
  - University of King's College buildings include main building and chapel, 1928; dormitory, 1931.
- Acadia University, Wolfville, Nova Scotia, including:
  - Raynor Hall Residence, 1916
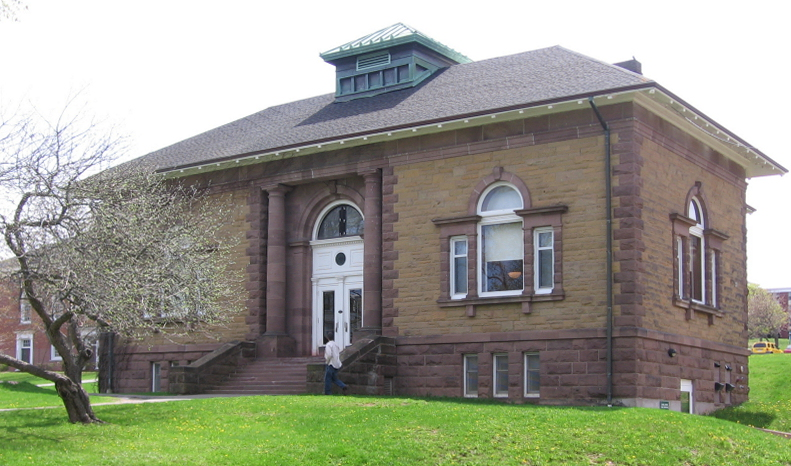
  - Emmerson Hall, Acadia University, was originally built 1913 as Emerson Memorial Library and shows strong Beaux Arts influences. It was erected to honour the memory of the Reverend R. H. Emmerson (1826-1857), father of the former premier of New Brunswick, H. R. Emmerson.
    Emmerson Hall, built in 1913, is particularly interesting for the variety of building stones used. In 1967 Emmerson Hall was converted to classrooms and offices for the School of Education. It is a registered Heritage Property.
  - Horton House, designed by Cobb in the Georgian style, and built by James Reid of Yarmouth, Nova Scotia was opened in 1915 as Horton Academy. Today, Horton House is a co-educational residence.
- Neptune Theatre, Halifax, built in 1915 it was originally known as the Strand Theatre and is reputed to be the first vaudeville house in Canada designed and built specifically as a theatre.

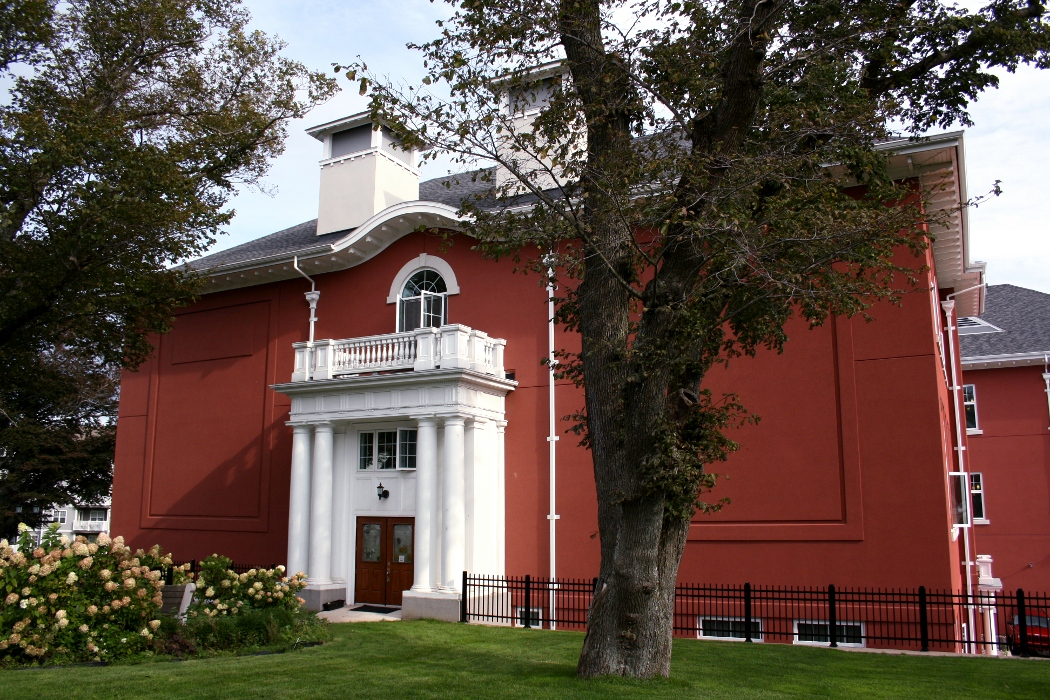
Greenvale School, now converted for residences.

- Dartmouth, Nova Scotia buildings
  - Greenvale School, Dartmouth, built in 1915 after a fire had destroyed the previous school in 1914. Built by Rhodes and Curry of Amherst, Nova Scotia, it was used as an infirmary and a sanctuary for the homeless after the Halifax Explosion. Dozens of trees were planted surrounding the building and they are now protected as heritage trees. Greenvale School has a list of firsts, including the first kindergarten class in Canada. It was Dartmouth's first high school in 1934.
- First Baptist Church of Dartmouth, built in 1922, (replacing the original church, which was built in 1843 and destroyed in the 1917 explosion). The stones used are rubble stone and the walls are 30-inches thick, which enabled the building to withstand the concussions of another explosion (at the military magazine) in July 1945 without damage.
- Corner Brook, Newfoundland - the largest commission of his career, he designed worker housing for the Newfoundland Pulp and Paper Company, which was constructing what was, up to that time, the largest project ever undertaken in the history of paper making. Many of the structures were inspired by the Arts and Crafts Movement. Townsite, as the development was known, contained over 175 houses and was laid out by Thomas Adams.
  - The Glynmill Inn, designed in 1923. Constructed by the English firm of Armstrong-Whitworth Co., is certainly the town's best-known building. Designed as a staff residence for Armstrong-Whitworth supervising employees. Cobb designed the Tudor-style house and in his honor the street leading to it was named Cobb Lane. A spot was reserved for the inn on the outskirts of Corner Brook between the townsite and the mill. Glynmill Inn is the finest building of its type in Western Newfoundland, and one of the best examples of a Tudor-inspired building in the province. The original Tudor Style half-timbering is still in place. The interior design was influenced by the Craftsman Style and remains relatively intact with few alterations.
- 710 Prince Street, Truro, Nova Scotia, built 1924. This is an example of a well-designed and well-crafted Tudor Revival House.
- Mount Allison University, Sackville, New Brunswick
  - Mount Allison Centennial Hall is the second oldest building on the University's central campus. Originally built in 1883 it housed administrative offices and college classrooms as well as a chapel and the college library. In March 1933 the building suffered extensive damage in a fire. After the fire, the foundation and some walls remained standing and Cobb incorporated them into the reconstructed building which officially opened in January 1934. It is currently in excellent condition and an extensive project was completed in recent years on the foundation to prevent deterioration due to water infiltration to ensure that the building remains that way over the long term.
  - Mount Allison Science Building: In the early 1930s, Cobb was selected to design Mount Allison's Science Building (now known as the Biology Building.) The University has done extensive work on the exterior in recent years to ensure that the building can be maintained over the long term. Work has included installation of a 50-year roof, re-pointed stonework, and land contour work to ensure that water flows away from and not towards the building as it had done previously. Mount Allison has also done three major projects on the inside of the building in recent years, including most recently a project to renew one of the research laboratories in the building.
  - Memorial Hall (originally Memorial Library, renamed the University Centre in 1970), Mount Allison University, Sackville, New Brunswick was constructed in 1927 in the Tudor Revival style. The original set of brass plaques that were located in the building have been moved to the Wallace McCain Student Centre and registered with the Canadian Forces' National Inventory of Canadian Military Memorials (#13002-004). In May 2011, the New Brunswick government issued notice of its intention to designate the building a Provincial Heritage Place, giving it protection from alteration or destruction; then, following a submission from the university, the Minister withdrew his notice, claiming that neither the building's heritage value nor its memorial nature met provincial criteria for provincial designation. The government has so far refused to release the evidence on which it based its decision, citing "privacy and financial issues". In October 2011, it was reported in the Argosy newspaper that the university refused a donation from philanthropist and alumna Joan Carlisle-Irving the previous August of $5 million to preserve Memorial Hall, which was the amount the university claimed was needed to restore the building. The University categorically denied that it was ever offered a donation from a donor to retain the building. The building was demolished in November 2011.

== Other contributions ==
- First president of the Nova Scotia Association of Architects (1932).
- Founding member and twice president of the Nova Scotia Museum of Fine Arts (later the Art Gallery of Nova Scotia)
- Fellow, Royal Institute of British Architects.
- Associate, Royal Canadian Academy of Arts (1942).
