= Joseph Scott (merchant) =

Canadian merchant and politician

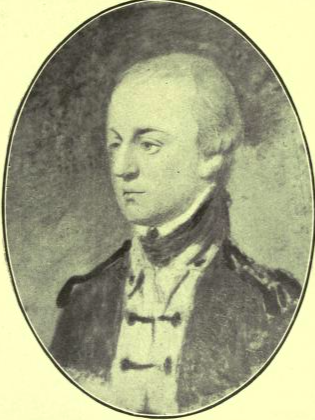
Lt. Col Joseph Scott, Volunteer Militia

Joseph Scott (1728 – September 29, 1800) was a soldier, merchant, government office holder, and political figure in Nova Scotia. He was a member of the 2nd Nova Scotia House of Assembly from 1759 to 1760. He built the Scott Manor House.

Joseph was born at Ballingarry, County Tipperary, Ireland in 1728, the third child of eight children born to John and Mary Scott. His grandfather Jeremiah came to Ireland with William III's invading English forces in 1690 and fought at the Battle of the Boyne. He later acquired a land grant in Ballingarry and developed it into a successful estate.

Scott served as quartermaster in one of the regiments raised by Governor Shirley of Massachusetts and arrived in Nova Scotia aboard the British vessel London as part of Edward Cornwallis' expedition to establish Halifax in 1749. In 1750 Scott wed Mary Morris, the daughter of Charles Morris and had four children with her; (Joseph, Susanna, William and Rose). Unfortunately Mary and her four children died prior to 1763 as on January 4, 1763, he married Margaret Ramsey Cottnam. They had a daughter (Elizabeth) and son (Michael).

By 1752 he had established himself as a merchant selling "wines, rum, Irish butter, soap, and coffee", etc. and invested in several other businesses. During this early period Scott acquired several government positions. In 1752 he was named Justice of the Peace, a judge in the Inferior Court of Common Pleas, in 1754 Surveyor of Lumber, and from 1761 to 1763 was the Paymaster for the Halifax garrison. He may even have acted as Commander of Fort Sackville for a short period around 1770.

Scott acquired his first grant of land in 1759, a parcel of 850 acres in Bedford/Sackville. This move to the Bedford area coincided closely with the establishment of peace with the Mi'kmaq in Nova Scotia after the defeat of the French at Louisbourg and Quebec. At this time he entered into the lumbering business, establishing several sawmills and a gristmill on his lands. He acquired an additional grant of 7000 acres enabling him to expand his lumbering business as the "...government was most anxious to encourage the shipment of lumber to England...". His Bedford/Sackville lands grew to encompass approximately 12,000 acres. In time his holdings expanded into current day Hants County. Evidence of this is found in his Will where upon his death he left to his wife the "George Field" estate consisting of 8000 acres around the old Acadian settlement of Les Cing Maisons, the area today known as St. Croix and Ardoise. In 1767 he inherited all his brother George Scott's Nova Scotia properties. It was on sixteen acres from this land parcel next to Fort Sackville that he built the Scott Manor House sometime between 1769 and 1772.

As a man of some influence Scott became involved in the political life of the fledgling colony. In 1758 he supported the colonists in their effort to end the military government and replace it with a representative assembly. He was elected to the new Nova Scotia Assembly, serving from 1759 to 1760. In 1776 Scott lobbied along with others for the removal of Governor Francis Legge from office.

He died in Sackville.
