= List of historic places in Halifax, Nova Scotia =

This article is a list of historic places in Halifax, Nova Scotia listed on the Canadian Register of Historic Places, all of which are designated as historic places either locally, provincially, federally or by more than one level of government. References to municipalities in the chart are to communities located within Halifax.

For historic places located elsewhere in Nova Scotia, see the List of historic places in Nova Scotia.

== List of historic places ==
Name	Address	Coordinates	Government recognition (CRHP №)	Wikidata ID	Image
Admiral's House	770 Young Avenue; Halifax NS	44°37′48″N 63°34′26″W	Federal (4756)	Q115331732	More images
Admiralty House National Historic Site of Canada	20 CFB Stadacona (2725 Gottingen St. at CFB Halifax); Halifax NS	44°39′28″N 63°35′29″W	Federal (2629, (15292)	Q6765797	More images
Alexander Lawlor House	38 King Street; Dartmouth NS	44°39′55″N 63°33′58″W	Dartmouth municipality (4124)	Q104591480	More images
Lorne Terrace	Building S-52 CFB Stadacona; Halifax NS	44°39′32″N 63°35′24″W	Federal (9501)	Q137177190	More images
Alexander James House (Evergreen House)	26 Newcastle Street; Dartmouth NS	44°40′00″N 63°33′36″W	Dartmouth municipality (3075)	Q130548975	More images
Anderson House	2519-2523 Brunswick Street; Halifax NS	44°39′27″N 63°35′18″W	Halifax municipality (2473)	Q137177262	More images
Honourable William Annand House	1226 Hollis Street; Halifax NS	44°38′27″N 63°34′10″W	Halifax municipality (4236)	Q136529062	More images
Art Gallery of Nova Scotia	1741 Hollis Street; Halifax NS	44°38′55″N 63°34′22″W	Nova Scotia (2853)	Q131740202	More images
Province House	1726 Hollis Street; Halifax NS	44°23′07″N 63°20′33″W	Federal (14222), Halifax municipality (1682)	Q3408310	More images
Dominion Public Building	1713 Bedford Row; Halifax NS	44°38′54″N 63°34′20″W	Federal (4336)	Q5291067	More images
Battery and Magazine	Shore Road and Purcell's Cove Road; Halifax NS	44°35′43″N 63°33′14″W	Federal (2015)	Q137325423	More images
Battery Command Post	Highest point of Fort McNab; Halifax NS	44°36′01″N 63°30′51″W	Federal (9741)	Q137843209	Upload Photo
Officer's Mess Building 1	Royal Artillery Park; Halifax NS	44°38′41″N 63°34′40″W	Federal (11276)	Q137360805	More images
Building No. 4	9 Grove Street, Nivens Avenue, French Cable Wharf, DREA; Dartmouth NS	44°40′16″N 63°35′28″W	Federal (7843)	Q137843215	Upload Photo
Caldwell House	1714 Robie Street; Halifax NS	44°38′38″N 63°35′19″W	Nova Scotia (3138), Halifax municipality (5326)	Q130549688	More images
Cambridge Military Library	Sackville Street; Halifax NS	44°38′38″N 63°34′34″W	Federal (3994)	Q16890066	More images
Carroll Building S-17	CFB Halifax; Halifax NS	44°39′39″N 63°35′38″W	Federal (9840)	Q137325184	More images
Casemates	Fort McNab; Halifax NS	44°36′00″N 63°30′55″W	Federal (11040)	Q137830378	More images
Cast Iron Façade / Coomb's Old English Shoe Store National Historic Site of Canada	1883-1885 Granville Street; Halifax NS	44°38′57″N 63°34′28″W	Federal (1393)	Q22978872	More images
Cavalier Building	Halifax Citadel; Halifax NS	44°38′49″N 63°34′50″W	Federal (2989)	Q137830386	More images
Christ Church	50 Wentworth Street; Dartmouth NS	44°40′03″N 63°34′05″W	Dartmouth municipality (4583)	Q136500211	More images
Clam Harbour Archaeological Site - BeCr-04	Clam Harbour Provincial Park; Clam Harbour NS	44°43′N 62°52′W	Nova Scotia (14895)	Q137843395	Upload Photo
Cleverdon Building	1709 Barrington Street; Halifax NS	44°34′28″N 63°34′26″W	Halifax municipality (1510)	Q137176962	More images
Cole Harbour Meeting House	1436 Cole Harbour Road; Cole Harbour NS	44°40′21″N 63°28′12″W	Nova Scotia (6651)	Q137843224	Upload Photo
Cole Harbour Farm	471-475 Poplar Drive; Dartmouth NS	44°40′21″N 63°29′59″W	Nova Scotia (6559), Dartmouth municipality (4204)	Q130549241	More images
Command Post	York Redoubt NHS; Halifax NS	44°35′30″N 63°33′27″W	Federal (6239)	Q137843234	Upload Photo
Fire Command Post	York Redoubt NHS; Halifax NS	44°38′N 63°33′W	Federal (3203)	Q137831331	More images
Commanding Officer's Residence	5425 Sackville Street; Halifax NS	44°38′38″N 63°34′34″W	Federal (11106)	Q137843381	More images
Commander's Residence	830 Young Avenue, CFB Halifax; Halifax NS	44°39′39″N 63°35′33″W	Federal (4755)	Q137843401	Upload Photo
Counterscarp Gallery	Halifax Citadel; Halifax NS	44°38′49″N 63°34′50″W	Federal (2991)	Q137843495	More images
Cookhouse, Building 626	York Redoubt NHS; Halifax NS	44°35′30″N 63°33′27″W	Federal (4419)	Q137843499	More images
Crystal Crescent Archaeological Site, Borden Number BcCv-01 to 03	Crystal Crescent Provincial Park; Sambro Island NS	44°27′N 63°37′W	Nova Scotia (6514)	Q137843612	Upload Photo
Currie Building, S37	CFB Halifax; Halifax NS	44°39′39″N 63°35′33″W	Federal (9581)	Q137843509	More images
Defensive Casemates 5-6	Halifax Citadel; Halifax NS	44°38′49″N 63°34′50″W	Federal (4395)	Q137843615	More images
Defensive Casemates 51 and 52	Halifax Citadel; Halifax NS	44°38′49″N 63°34′50″W	Federal (4406)	Q137843618	More images
Defensive Casemates 57 and 58	Halifax Citadel; Halifax NS	44°38′49″N 63°34′50″W	Federal (4407)	Q137843622	More images
Dingle Tower	260 Dingle Road; Halifax NS	44°37′49″N 63°35′50″W	Federal (12262), Halifax municipality (2447)	Q23019149	More images
Dingle Tower and Sir Sanford Fleming Park	260 Dingle Road; Halifax NS	44°37′49″N 63°35′50″W	Halifax municipality (3079)	Q14875769	More images
Dockyard Terrace	Buildings 77, 78 and 79 HMC Dockyard Terrace; Halifax NS	44°39′27″N 63°34′54″W	Federal (11261)	Q137843518	More images
Elledge McElmon House	52 King Street; Dartmouth NS	44°39′57″N 63°34′00″W	Dartmouth municipality (4135)	Q104591503	More images
Elsie Hume House	8502 No. 3 Highway; Black Point NS	44°39′12″N 63°59′00″W	Nova Scotia (7823)	Q130634190	Upload Photo
Former Artillery Stores, Building 91	Fort Charlotte, Georges Island; Halifax NS	44°38′28″N 63°33′33″W	Federal (4413)	Q137843645	Upload Photo
Former Artillery Stores, Building 629	York Redoubt NHS; Halifax NS	44°35′30″N 63°33′27″W	Federal (4405)	Q137843652	More images
Former Field Forge Storage Building No. 90	Fort Charlotte, Georges Island; Halifax NS	44°38′28″N 63°33′34″W	Federal (4414)	Q137843661	Upload Photo
Former Guardhouse / Fire Engine House / Coal Stores, Building 114	Fort Charlotte, Georges Island; Halifax NS	44°38′28″N 63°33′34″W	Federal (4418)	Q137843667	Upload Photo
Former Guardroom and Prisoners' Quarters	Fort Charlotte, Georges Island; Halifax NS	44°38′28″N 63°33′33″W	Federal (4415)	Q137843669	Upload Photo
Former Hampton Gray Memorial School, Building 14	CFB Shearwater; Halifax NS	44°38′17″N 63°29′53″W	Federal (4227)	Q137845638	Upload Photo
Former Stores Building 110 (Carpenter Shop and Smithy)	Georges Island; Halifax NS	44°38′28″N 63°33′32″W	Federal (2831)	Q137845647	Upload Photo
Fort McNab National Historic Site of Canada	McNabs Island; Halifax NS	44°36′06″N 63°30′54″W	Federal (15810)	Q23010219	More images
Fultz House	33 Sackville Drive; Lower Sackville NS	44°45′10″N 63°39′54″W	Lower Sackville municipality (7120)	Q5508489	More images
Gas House	Sambro Island NS	44°28′N 63°35′W	Federal (4426)	Q137843530	More images
Georges Island National Historic Site of Canada	Georges Island; Halifax NS	44°38′29″N 63°33′33″W	Federal (7619)	Q3559232	More images
Government House National Historic Site of Canada	1451 Barrington Street; Halifax NS	44°38′35″N 63°34′19″W	Federal (12641), Nova Scotia (2161)	Q5588906	More images
Grace Hiltz House	47 Wentworth Street; Dartmouth NS	44°40′03″N 63°34′06″W	Dartmouth municipality (3080)	Q103211519	More images
Greenvale School	130 Ochterloney Street; Dartmouth NS	44°40′09″N 63°33′54″W	Dartmouth municipality (3366)	Q103289254	More images
Gun Emplacement, Magazine and Crew Shelter 2	Fort McNab; Halifax NS	44°36′01″N 63°30′53″W	Federal (9920)	Q137845673	Upload Photo
Gun Emplacement, Magazine and Crew Shelter 1	Fort McNab; Halifax NS	44°36′01″N 63°30′58″W	Federal (9921)	Q137845684	More images
Gun Emplacements 3 and 4, Radar Building, Left Magazine and Crew Shelter	Fort McNab; Halifax NS	44°35′59″N 63°30′52″W	Federal (9955)	Q137845691	Upload Photo
Halifax Citadel National Historic Site of Canada	5161 George Street; Halifax NS	44°38′50″N 63°34′49″W	Federal (7622)	Q321867	More images
Halifax Court House National Historic Site of Canada	5250 Spring Garden Road; Halifax NS	44°38′37″N 63°34′26″W	Federal (12832), Nova Scotia (1677)	Q5642159	More images
Halifax Defense Complex, Georges Island, Fort Charlotte, South, Southeast and Southwest Caponiers	Fort Charlotte, Georges Island; Halifax NS	44°38′28″N 63°33′34″W	Federal (4417)	Q137845699	Upload Photo
Halifax Dockyard National Historic Site of Canada	Barrington and Upper Water Streets; Halifax NS	44°39′32″N 63°35′02″W	Federal (16146)	Q7374530	More images
Halifax Public Gardens National Historic Site of Canada	Spring Garden Road; Halifax NS	44°38′34″N 63°34′49″W	Federal (2633), Halifax municipality (3221)	Q4901477	More images
Halifax Waterfront Buildings National Historic Site of Canada	Upper Water Street; Halifax NS	44°39′01″N 63°34′24″W	Federal (1614), Halifax municipality (1536)	Q16843488	More images
Henry House	1222 Barrington Street; Halifax NS	44°38′25″N 63°34′15″W	Federal (12665), Nova Scotia (4490), Halifax municipality (3383)	Q14816526	More images
Henry Elliot House	99 Ochterloney Street; Dartmouth NS	44°40′06″N 63°34′00″W	Dartmouth municipality (7119)	Q117384828	More images
James Austin House	287 Portland Street; Dartmouth NS	44°40′09″N 63°33′23″W	Dartmouth municipality (3467)	Q103843714	More images
James McKenzie House	5675 North Street; Halifax NS	44°39′21″N 63°35′36″W	Halifax municipality (7092)	Q136484624	More images
James Orman House	34 King Street; Dartmouth NS	44°39′55″N 63°33′57″W	Dartmouth municipality (4878)	Q105948272	More images
James Simmonds House	51-53 Pleasant Street; Dartmouth NS	44°40′06″N 63°33′33″W	Dartmouth municipality (5325)	Q106596470	More images
John Salisbury House	42 Summit Street; Dartmouth NS	44°40′12″N 63°33′20″W	Dartmouth municipality (4770)	Q130742364	More images
Johnstone Chittick House	149 Prince Albert Road; Dartmouth NS	44°40′27″N 63°33′37″W	Dartmouth municipality (3853)	Q136500274	More images
Joseph Howe Austen House	37 Pleasant Street; Dartmouth NS	44°40′07″N 63°33′37″W	Dartmouth municipality (3712)	Q103965215	More images
Laboratory, former Building 92	Fort Charlotte, Georges Island; Halifax NS	44°38′29″N 63°33′35″W	Federal (4412)	Q137845704	Upload Photo
Lighthouse	Entrance to St. Margaret's Bay; Peggys Cove NS	44°29′28″N 63°55′08″W	Federal (2921)	Q1821453	More images
Terence Bay Lighthouse	Sandy Cove Road; Terence Bay NS	44°27′36″N 63°42′20″W	Federal (20721)	Q28375827	More images
Lower Battery	Fort Charlotte, Georges Island; Halifax NS	44°38′N 63°33′W	Federal (3163)	Q137845755	Upload Photo
Main Magazine, Building 611	York Redoubt NHS; Halifax NS	44°35′45″N 63°33′20″W	Federal (4420)	Q137845762	More images
Main Magazine and Tunnel Complex, Building 89 Classified Federal Heritage Building	Fort Charlotte, Georges Island; Halifax NS	44°38′27″N 63°33′32″W	Federal (3164)	Q137845773	Upload Photo
Married Officers Quarters, former Building 125 Recognized Federal Heritage Building	Georges Island; Halifax NS	44°38′28″N 63°33′32″W	Federal (2830)	Q137845779	Upload Photo
Mary Queen of Scots House	1266 Queen Street; Halifax NS	44°38′25″N 63°34′29″W	Halifax municipality (6751)	Q131862419	More images
Maugher's Beach Light Tower	McNabs Island; Halifax NS	44°36′08″N 63°32′01″W	Federal (16003)	Q28375733	More images
Moirs Ltd. Power House	926 Bedford Highway; Bedford NS	44°42′51″N 63°40′41″W	Nova Scotia (2755), Bedford municipality (3150)	Q136812933	More images
Murray Building (S-15)	CFB Halifax; Halifax NS	44°39′39″N 63°35′33″W	Federal (9518)	Q137845879	More images
Mystery House	95 King Street; Dartmouth NS	44°40′02″N 63°34′11″W	Dartmouth municipality (3482)	Q136528579	More images
North Caponiers, Building 82A & 82B	Fort Charlotte, Georges Island; Halifax NS	44°38′28″N 63°33′34″W	Federal (4416)	Q137846309	Upload Photo
North Expense Magazine	Halifax Citadel; Halifax NS	44°38′49″N 63°34′50″W	Federal (4408)	Q137846494	More images
Northeast Salient	Halifax Citadel; Halifax NS	44°38′49″N 63°34′50″W	Federal (4409)	Q137846553	More images
Officers' Married Quarters	5425 Sackville Street; Halifax NS	44°38′38″N 63°34′37″W	Federal (11111)	Q137846515	More images
Oil Stores and Artificers Shop	Fort McNab; Halifax NS	44°36′02″N 63°30′54″W	Federal (9952)	Q137846531	Upload Photo
Old Burying Ground National Historic Site of Canada	1460 Barrington Street; Halifax NS	44°38′36″N 63°34′22″W	Federal (9982), Nova Scotia (6787)	Q7083564	More images
Owl Drug Store	71 Portland Street; Dartmouth NS	44°39′57″N 63°34′00″W	Dartmouth municipality (3355)	Q136528560	More images
Pier 21 National Historic Site of Canada	1055 Marginal Road; Halifax NS	44°38′18″N 63°33′56″W	Federal (7648)	Q512474	More images
Prince of Wales Tower National Historic Site of Canada	Tower Road; Halifax NS	44°37′17″N 63°34′11″W	Federal (7471, (3175)	Q7244404	More images
Quaker House	57-59 Ochterloney Street; Dartmouth NS	44°40′01″N 63°34′06″W	Nova Scotia (2577), Dartmouth municipality (3066)	Q16899015	More images
Ralston Building	1557 Hollis Street; Halifax NS	44°38′45″N 63°34′17″W	Federal (9515)		Upload Photo
Range Finder Bunker	York Redoubt NHS; Halifax NS	44°35′32″N 63°33′00″W	Federal (11658)	Q137846661	More images
Redan	Halifax Citadel; Halifax NS	44°38′49″N 63°34′50″W	Federal (2996)	Q137846673	More images
Robert Innes House	7 Newcastle Street; Dartmouth NS	44°40′02″N 63°33′40″W	Dartmouth municipality (3624)	Q103964264	More images
St. John's Anglican Church	8 Church Road; Peggys Cove NS	44°29′42″N 63°54′56″W	Peggys Cove municipality (3320)	Q7588575	More images
St. Mary's Basilica National Historic Site of Canada	1508 Barrington St. (at Spring Garden Rd.); Halifax NS	44°38′39″N 63°34′24″W	Federal (12131)	Q908976	More images
St. Patrick's Roman Catholic Church	2263 Brunswick Street; Halifax NS	44°39′15″N 63°34′58″W	Nova Scotia (15335)	Q16900626	More images
St. Paul's Anglican Church	71 St. Paul's Lane; French Village NS	44°37′38″N 63°55′26″W	French Village municipality (8045)	Q137846697	Upload Photo
Samuel Greenwood House	63 King Street; Dartmouth NS	44°39′58″N 63°34′04″W	Dartmouth municipality (4123)	Q104591445	More images
Scott Manor House	15 Fort Sackville Road; Bedford NS	44°43′45″N 63°39′36″W	Nova Scotia (2987), Bedford municipality (3143)	Q14875767	More images
Searchlights 690, 691, 692	York Redoubt NHS; Halifax NS	44°35′30″N 63°33′27″W	Federal (4404)	Q137846709	More images
Searchlight Emplacement Building 16	McNab's Island; Halifax NS	44°35′45″N 63°30′42″W	Federal (10396)	Q137846730	More images
Sir Sandford Fleming Barn	30-32 Dingle Road; Halifax NS	44°37′49″N 63°35′50″W	Nova Scotia (2451), Halifax municipality (9372)	Q137846750	More images
Sir Sandford Fleming Cottage	30 Dingle Road; Halifax NS	44°37′52″N 63°36′11″W	Nova Scotia (3848), Halifax municipality (2455)	Q136815627	More images
South Caponier	York Redoubt NHS; Halifax NS	44°35′30″N 63°33′27″W	Federal (4421)	Q137846765	More images
South Expense Magazine	Halifax Citadel; Halifax NS	44°38′49″N 63°34′50″W	Federal (4425)	Q137846935	More images
Southeast Salient	Halifax Citadel; Halifax NS	44°38′N 63°35′W	Federal (3173)	Q137847130	More images
Sterns' Corner	81 Alderney Drive; Dartmouth NS	44°39′52″N 63°34′06″W	Dartmouth municipality (3859)	Q136812869	More images
The Teachery	9 Spring Street; Bedford NS	44°43′38″N 63°40′00″W	Bedford municipality (3381)	Q137847290	Upload Photo
Thomas Boggs-Lawrence Hartshorne House	53 Ochterloney Street; Dartmouth NS	44°40′00″N 63°34′07″W	Dartmouth municipality (3424)	Q131905349	More images
Thurso House	289 Portland Street; Dartmouth NS	44°40′09″N 63°33′23″W	Dartmouth municipality (5085)	Q106357317	More images
Town Clock on Citadel Hill	Brunswick Street; Halifax NS	44°38′51″N 63°34′39″W	Federal (4260)	Q1725585	More images
Van Steenburgh and Polaris Buildings at The Bedford Institute of Oceanography	Baffin Boulevard; Dartmouth NS	44°40′58″N 63°36′41″W	Federal (4261)	Q137847304	Upload Photo
Victoria Road United Baptist Church	36 Victoria Road; Dartmouth NS	44°40′09″N 63°34′01″W	Dartmouth municipality (3852)	Q133462271	More images
Wellington House	Building S12, Barrington Street (CFB Halifax); Halifax NS	44°39′42″N 63°35′37″W	Federal (16584)	Q115331511	More images
West Ravelin Guardhouse	Halifax Citadel; Halifax NS	44°38′49″N 63°34′50″W	Federal (4410)	Q137847326	More images
West Curtain Wall	Halifax Citadel; Halifax NS	44°38′49″N 63°34′50″W	Federal (4411)	Q137847334	More images
William Black Memorial United Church	10515 Peggy's Cove Road; No. 333 Highway; Glen Margaret NS	44°35′11″N 63°54′55″W	Nova Scotia (9465)	Q137162786	Upload Photo
William Walker House	119 Prince Albert Road; Dartmouth NS	44°40′21″N 63°33′44″W	Dartmouth municipality (3566)	Q136500244	More images
York Manuel Fish Shed and Store	32 Lobster Lane; Peggys Cove NS	44°29′37″N 63°54′58″W	Nova Scotia (14684)	Q137181100	More images
York Redoubt National Historic Site of Canada	Shore Road and Purcell's Cove Road; Halifax NS	44°35′43″N 63°33′14″W	Federal (7746)	Q8055521	More images
Leadley House	47 North Street; Dartmouth NS	44°40′05″N 63°34′07″W	Dartmouth municipality (6718)	Q136500203	More images
Charles A. Robson House	64 Queen Street; Dartmouth NS	44°40′02″N 63°33′58″W	Dartmouth municipality (7252)	Q117508462	More images
James-Robson House	62 Queen Street; Dartmouth NS	44°40′01″N 63°33′58″W	Dartmouth municipality (7253)	Q136814508	More images
Wesley Forbes House	41 Pleasant Street; Dartmouth NS	44°40′07″N 63°33′37″W	Dartmouth municipality (7254)	Q117508868	More images
90-92 Ochterloney Street	90-92 Ochterloney Street; Dartmouth NS	44°40′04″N 63°34′01″W	Dartmouth municipality (10385)	Q136484650	More images
Oakwood House	88A Crichton Avenue; Dartmouth NS	44°40′34″N 63°33′46″W	Dartmouth municipality (3354)	Q137847347	More images
70 Victoria Road	70 Victoria Road; Dartmouth NS	44°40′14″N 63°34′11″W	Dartmouth municipality (8074)	Q136528528	More images
Local Council of Women of Halifax House	989 Young Ave; Halifax NS	44°38′03″N 63°34′32″W	Halifax municipality (3109)	Q115332034	More images
South Magazine and Shifting Room Classified Federal Heritage Building	Halifax Citadel; Halifax NS	44°38′59″N 63°34′46″W	Federal (3169)	Q137847448	More images
Bengal Lancers Property	1690 Bell Road; Halifax NS	44°38′43″N 63°35′00″W	Halifax municipality (3316)	Q103276214	More images
Thorndean	5680 Inglis Street; Halifax NS	44°38′03″N 63°34′31″W	Nova Scotia (7288), Halifax municipality (3380)	Q117509304	More images
Carlton Victorian Streetscape	1452-1489 Carlton Street; Halifax NS	44°38′25″N 63°35′05″W	Halifax municipality (3584)	Q137847459	Upload Photo
James Rose House	6201 Shirley Street; Halifax NS	44°38′41″N 63°35′43″W	Halifax municipality (3824)	Q136814450	More images
Smith Victorian Streetscape	5214-5250 Smith Street; Halifax NS	44°38′12″N 63°34′14″W	Halifax municipality (3851)	Q137847486	More images
Tower Victorian Streetscape	1041-1105 Tower Road; Halifax NS	44°38′07″N 63°34′41″W	Halifax municipality (4011)	Q137847497	More images
5651 - 5691 Inglis Street	5651-5691 Inglis Street; Halifax NS	44°38′05″N 63°34′31″W	Federal (3953)	Q137847511	More images
5721 - 5765 Inglis Street	5721-5765 Inglis Street; Halifax NS	44°38′03″N 63°34′38″W	Halifax municipality (4117)	Q136528818	More images
Oakland Lodge	1124 Robie Street; Halifax NS	44°38′06″N 63°35′05″W	Halifax municipality (4138)	Q104591526	More images
Senator William Dennis House	1731 Rosebank Avenue; 6503 Jubilee Road; Halifax NS	44°38′26″N 63°36′04″W	Halifax municipality (4923)	Q136497156	More images
The Bower	5918 Rogers Drive; Halifax NS	44°37′43″N 63°34′46″W	Nova Scotia (5224), Halifax municipality (6849)	Q137177026	More images
Universalist Unitarian Church of Halifax	5500 Inglis Street; Halifax NS	44°38′06″N 63°34′22″W	Nova Scotia (5768)	Q107302325	More images
Wright Building	1672-74 Barrington Street; Halifax NS	44°38′49″N 63°34′26″W	Halifax municipality (10700)	Q136816275	More images
George Wright House	989 Young Avenue; Halifax NS	44°38′03″N 63°34′32″W	Nova Scotia (7324)	Q115332034	More images
Fernwood National Historic Site of Canada	700 Franklyn Street; Halifax NS	44°37′34″N 63°34′40″W	Federal (7603)	Q23009412	More images
Fort Massey United Church	1181 Queen Street; Halifax NS	44°38′20″N 63°34′24″W	Nova Scotia (7704)	Q115330460	More images
1606 Bell Road	1606 Bell Road; Halifax NS	44°38′41″N 63°34′52″W	Halifax municipality (10631)	Q136500389	More images
Former City Club	1580 Barrington Street; Halifax NS	44°38′45″N 63°34′25″W	Halifax municipality (1390)	Q136497181	More images
Sievert's Tobacco Building	1573 Barrington Street; Halifax NS	44°38′45″N 63°34′23″W	Halifax municipality (1392)	Q136497210	More images
Colwell Building	1673 Barrington Street; Halifax NS	44°38′49″N 63°34′25″W	Halifax municipality (1507)	Q136802806	More images
Shaw Building	1855-1859 Hollis Street; Halifax NS	44°38′59″N 63°34′25″W	Halifax municipality (1534)	Q137177053	More images
Former Church of England Institute	1588 Barrington Street; Halifax NS	44°38′45″N 63°34′25″W	Halifax municipality (2369)	Q131139884	More images
Macara-Barnstead Building	1796-1798 Granville Street; Halifax NS	44°38′56″N 63°34′27″W	Halifax municipality (2459)	Q137177309	More images
St. Paul's Church (Halifax) National Historic Site of Canada	1747 Argyle Street; 1 St. Paul's Hill; Halifax NS	44°38′51″N 63°34′28″W	Federal (12134), Nova Scotia (3065)	Q1547982	More images
Grand Parade	1790 Argyle Street; Halifax NS	44°38′54″N 63°34′30″W	Halifax municipality (3146)	Q5594872	More images
The Benjamin Wier House	1459 Hollis Street; Halifax NS	44°38′38″N 63°34′15″W	Nova Scotia (3157), Halifax municipality (3888)	Q110974280	More images
Geldert (Old Bowes)	5136-5138 Prince Street; Halifax NS	44°38′51″N 63°34′20″W	Halifax municipality (3208)	Q137847558	More images
Imperial Oil Building	1860 Upper Water Street; Halifax NS	44°38′59″N 63°34′25″W	Halifax municipality (3209)	Q137177095	More images
Old Fire Station	1679 Bedford Row; Halifax NS	44°38′51″N 63°34′19″W	Halifax municipality (3211)	Q136500429	More images
VIA Rail Station	1161 Hollis Street; Halifax NS	44°38′23″N 63°34′06″W	Federal (4521)	Q3095762	More images
Royal Bank Building	5509 - 5513 Young Street; Halifax NS	44°39′45″N 63°35′56″W	Halifax municipality (3438)	Q137177365	More images
The Bank of Nova Scotia	1709 Hollis Street; Halifax NS	44°38′52″N 63°34′21″W	Nova Scotia (6287), Halifax municipality (3251)	Q131905181	More images
Bollard House	1597 Dresden Row; Halifax NS	44°38′41″N 63°34′43″W	Nova Scotia (3971), Halifax municipality (3275)	Q136500340	More images
Mitchell House	1684 Lower Water Street; Halifax NS	44°38′52″N 63°34′18″W	Halifax municipality (3276)	Q136817821	More images
Lenoir Building	1659-1663 Hollis Street; Halifax NS	44°38′50″N 63°34′20″W	Halifax municipality (3294)	Q136500409	More images
Harrington MacDonald-Briggs Building	1865 Hollis Street; 1866 Upper Water Street; Halifax NS	44°38′59″N 63°34′26″W	Halifax municipality (3375)	Q137847576	More images
Fishwick & Company Building	1861 Hollis Street; Halifax NS	44°38′59″N 63°34′26″W	Halifax municipality (3379)	Q137847594	More images
Granville Mall Streetscape	1854-1895 Granville Street; Halifax NS	44°38′59″N 63°34′29″W	Halifax municipality (3398)	Q137847622	More images
P. Martin Liquors Building	1870 Upper Water Street; Halifax NS	44°39′00″N 63°34′25″W	Halifax municipality (3433)	Q137177493	More images
Edward Goreham House	5170-5172 Bishop Street; Halifax NS	44°38′35″N 63°34′16″W	Halifax municipality (3451)	Q137177615	More images
Charles H. Willis House	5178-5180 Bishop Street; Halifax NS	44°38′35″N 63°34′17″W	Halifax municipality (3452)	Q136815585	More images
William Fraser House	5182-5184 Bishop Street; Halifax NS	44°38′35″N 63°34′17″W	Halifax municipality (3468)	Q137177638	More images
Joseph Seeton House	1253 Barrington Street; Halifax NS	44°38′28″N 63°34′15″W	Halifax municipality (3530)	Q26220639	More images
Halliburton House	5184 Morris Street; Halifax NS	44°38′30″N 63°34′15″W	Halifax municipality (3621)	Q136815154	More images
Lithgow House	5172 Morris Street; Halifax NS	44°38′30″N 63°34′14″W	Halifax municipality (3622)	Q137847630	More images
Pryor-Binney House	5178 Morris Street; Halifax NS	44°38′30″N 63°34′14″W	Halifax municipality (3623)	Q137847645	More images
People's Bank Building	5159 Duke Street; Halifax NS	44°38′59″N 63°34′25″W	Halifax municipality (3735)	Q136497203	More images
Story-Wilson House	5270 Morris Street; Halifax NS	44°38′28″N 63°34′23″W	Halifax municipality (3854)	Q137179712	More images
Halifax Academy	1649 Brunswick Street; Halifax NS	44°38′45″N 63°34′34″W	Nova Scotia (5767), Halifax municipality (3896)	Q39054268	More images
South Park Victorian Streetscape	1263-1283 and 1293 South Park Street; Halifax NS	44°38′22″N 63°34′41″W	Halifax municipality (4008)	Q136500250	More images
Ellen (Allie) Ahern House	5308 South Street; Halifax NS	44°38′21″N 63°34′24″W	Halifax municipality (4181)	Q136499787	More images
Robertson's Hardware & Warehouse	1675 Lower Water Street; Halifax NS	44°38′52″N 63°34′17″W	Halifax municipality (4886)	Q105949061	More images
Alex Mclean House	1328-1332 Hollis Street; Halifax NS	44°38′33″N 63°34′13″W	Halifax municipality (5324)	Q131144269	More images
National Film Board Building	1572 Barrington Street; Halifax NS	44°38′43″N 63°34′26″W	Halifax municipality (5553)	Q131903445	More images
Pacific Building	1537 Barrington Street; Halifax NS	44°38′42″N 63°34′22″W	Halifax municipality (5640)	Q136818130	More images
Prince and Hollis Buildings	5136-38 Prince Street; 5140 Prince Street; 5144 Prince Street; 1695 Hollis Street; Halifax NS	44°38′51″N 63°34′21″W	Nova Scotia (6642)	Q137847658	More images
William DeBlois House	1346 Hollis Street; Halifax NS	44°38′34″N 63°34′14″W	Halifax municipality (6785)	Q136816026	More images
St. Mary's Basilica	5221 Spring Garden Road; Halifax NS	44°38′40″N 63°34′24″W	Nova Scotia (7218)	Q908976	More images
Grafton Street Methodist Church	1544 Grafton Street; Halifax NS	44°38′41″N 63°34′30″W	Nova Scotia (7332)	Q115331245	More images
Morse's Teas	1877-79 Hollis Street; Halifax NS	44°39′00″N 63°34′26″W	Halifax municipality (7955)	Q136816345	More images
Nova Scotia Furnishings	1668 Barrington Street; Halifax NS	44°38′48″N 63°34′26″W	Halifax municipality (7957)	Q136497188	More images
G.M. Smith Building	1715-19 Barrington Street; Halifax NS	44°38′51″N 63°34′27″W	Halifax municipality (7993)	Q137179735	More images
St. Matthew's Manse	1355 Barrington Street; Halifax NS	44°38′34″N 63°34′18″W	Halifax municipality (8015)	Q136816355	More images
W. M. Brown Building	1549-51 Barrington Street; Halifax NS	44°38′43″N 63°34′23″W	Halifax municipality (8069)	Q136816136	More images
1724 Granville Street	1724 Granville Street; Halifax NS	44°38′52″N 63°34′25″W	Halifax municipality (10536)	Q131139770	Upload Photo
Black-Binney House National Historic Site of Canada	1472 Hollis Street; Halifax NS	44°38′36″N 63°34′14″W	Federal (10583), Halifax municipality (6850)	Q23011176	More images
Keith Hall and Brewery	1475 Hollis Street; 1496 Lower Water Street; Halifax NS	44°38′41″N 63°34′17″W	Halifax municipality (11003)	Q137847700	More images
Building 6	Royal Artillery Park; Halifax NS	44°38′42″N 63°34′35″W	Federal (11269)	Q137847804	More images
Halifax City Hall National Historic Site of Canada	1841 Argyle Street; Halifax NS	44°38′56″N 63°34′30″W	Federal (12061), Halifax municipality (3277)	Q1352771	More images
Granville Block National Historic Site of Canada	Granville, Hollis and Duke Streets; Halifax NS	44°38′59″N 63°34′28″W	Federal (12463)	Q23011167	More images
S.S. Acadia National Historic Site of Canada	1675 Lower Water Street; Halifax NS	44°38′53″N 63°34′12″W	Federal (12741)	Q5014257	More images
HMCS Sackville National Historic Site of Canada	1655 Lower Water Street; Halifax NS	44°38′51″N 63°34′12″W	Federal (14548)	Q5630909	More images
Jonathan McCully House National Historic Site of Canada	2507 Brunswick Street; Halifax NS	44°39′27″N 63°35′17″W	Federal (1144)	Q23015905	More images
Africville National Historic Site of Canada	Seaview Park; Halifax NS	44°40′28″N 63°37′10″W	Federal (1153)	Q2826181	More images
Charles F. Dewolf House	2125 Brunswick Street; Halifax NS	44°39′11″N 63°34′53″W	Halifax municipality (1545)	Q136528618	More images
Ott-Beamish Cottage	2229 Brunswick Street; Halifax NS	44°39′14″N 63°34′57″W	Halifax municipality (1966)	Q136499924	More images
David Starr House	2415 Brunswick Street; Halifax NS	44°39′22″N 63°35′09″W	Halifax municipality (2380)	Q136499682	More images
West-Hawkins House	2421 Brunswick Street; Halifax NS	44°39′23″N 63°35′10″W	Halifax municipality (2456)	Q136499957	More images
James West House	2461-2463 Brunswick Street; Halifax NS	44°39′24″N 63°35′13″W	Halifax municipality (2457)	Q136499717	More images
Fraser House	2223 Brunswick Street; Halifax NS	44°39′14″N 63°34′57″W	Halifax municipality (2458)	Q136499808	More images
Halifax Forum	2901 Windsor Street; Halifax NS	44°39′20″N 63°36′17″W	Halifax municipality (3142)	Q5642175	More images
Smyth House	2237 Brunswick Street; Halifax NS	44°39′14″N 63°34′58″W	Halifax municipality (3247)	Q136499650	More images
Huestis House	2275 Brunswick Street; Halifax NS	44°39′16″N 63°35′00″W	Halifax municipality (3248)	Q131842587	More images
Hennessey Place Hydrostones	5520-5532 Hennessey Place; Halifax NS	44°39′44″N 63°35′59″W	Halifax municipality (3377)	Q136528504	More images
Fleming House	2549-2553 Brunswick Street; Halifax NS	44°39′28″N 63°35′19″W	Halifax municipality (3378)	Q131912415	More images
Halifax Relief Commission Building	5555 Young Street; Halifax NS	44°39′42″N 63°35′59″W	Halifax municipality (3439)	Q136818051	More images
Hydrostone Market	5515-5547 Young Street; Halifax NS	44°39′44″N 63°35′58″W	Halifax municipality (3565)	Q132334831	More images
West-Vaux House	2427-2429 Brunswick Street; Halifax NS	44°39′23″N 63°35′10″W	Halifax municipality (3585)	Q136499893	More images
West-Webster House	2138 Brunswick Street; Halifax NS	44°39′10″N 63°34′55″W	Nova Scotia (3679)	Q136499619	More images
Walden Square	5419 Portland Place; Halifax NS	44°39′08″N 63°34′52″W	Halifax municipality (3731)	Q137179768	More images
St. Mark's Church	5522 Russell Street; Halifax NS	44°39′40″N 63°35′51″W	Halifax municipality (3826)	Q136815171	More images
Avery House	2370 Moran Street; Halifax NS	44°39′07″N 63°35′24″W	Halifax municipality (3849)	Q137177162	More images
Universalist Church	2146 Brunswick Street; Halifax NS	44°39′11″N 63°34′55″W	Nova Scotia (3897)	Q137847812	Upload Photo
West-Buley House	2146 Brunswick Street; Halifax NS	44°39′11″N 63°34′55″W	Nova Scotia (7394)	Q137847835	More images
Princess Place Victorian Townhouses	2323-2337 Princess Place; Halifax NS	44°39′06″N 63°35′27″W	Halifax municipality (4010)	Q137847863	More images
Churchfield Barracks	2046-2068 Brunswick Street; Halifax NS	44°39′06″N 63°34′49″W	Halifax municipality (4122)	Q137847874	More images
Henry Busch House	2575-2581 Creighton Street; Halifax NS	44°39′23″N 63°35′29″W	Halifax municipality (4162)	Q137847886	Upload Photo
Stone House	25049 Highway no. 7 Port Dufferin NS	44°54′17″N 62°23′45″W	Port Dufferin municipality (7093)	Q137847893	Upload Photo
St. George's Anglican / Round Church National Historic Site of Canada	2222 Brunswick Street; Halifax NS	44°39′14″N 63°34′59″W	Federal (4446), Nova Scotia (6566), Halifax municipality (3403)	Q14875774	More images
Little Dutch (Deutsch) Church National Historic Site of Canada	2393 Brunswick Street; Halifax NS	44°39′21″N 63°35′08″W	Federal (12462), Nova Scotia (6482), Halifax municipality (3252)	Q15242497	More images
West-Osler House	2140 Brunswick Street; Halifax NS	44°39′10″N 63°34′55″W	Nova Scotia (7395)	Q136499602	More images
Hydrostone District National Historic Site of Canada	Hydrostone neighbourhood Halifax NS	44°39′47″N 63°36′09″W	Federal (7625)	Q7741200	More images
Church of Holy Redeemer	2128 Brunswick Street; Halifax NS	44°39′10″N 63°34′54″W	Halifax municipality (7956)	Q137847906	More images
5522 North Street	5522 North Street; Halifax NS	44°39′24″N 63°35′30″W	Halifax municipality (10382)	Q136484569	More images
5516 North Street	5516 North Street; Halifax NS	44°39′25″N 63°35′30″W	Halifax municipality (10387)	Q136484504	More images
2548 Gottingen Street	2548 Gottingen Street; Halifax NS	44°39′25″N 63°35′26″W	Halifax municipality (10574)	Q136499703	More images
5355 Russell Street	5355 Russell Street; Halifax NS	44°39′45″N 63°35′44″W	Halifax municipality (10701)	Q136484488	More images
Halifax Drill Hall National Historic Site of Canada	2667 North Park Street; Halifax NS	44°39′06″N 63°35′13″W	Federal (13395, (3160)	Q5642122	More images
Akins House National Historic Site of Canada	2151 Brunswick Street; Halifax NS	44°39′12″N 63°34′55″W	Federal (13963)	Q23011174	More images
Chebucto School	6199 Chebucto Road; Halifax NS	44°39′01″N 63°35′52″W	Halifax municipality (3479)	Q131871490	More images
Pineo House (Caribou Lodge)	6 Armada Drive; Halifax NS	44°40′26″N 63°38′50″W	Halifax municipality (3376)	Q130743104	More images
D'Anville's Encampment National Historic Site of Canada	Centennial Park, Bedford Highway; Halifax NS	44°40′29″N 63°38′48″W	Federal (14826)	Q23009404	More images
Mont Blanc Anchor Site	110 Spinnaker Drive; Halifax NS	44°38′16″N 63°36′58″W	Halifax municipality (2582)	Q96003590	More images
11 St. Margaret's Bay Road	11 St. Margaret's Bay Road; Halifax NS	44°38′30″N 63°37′22″W	Halifax municipality (10926)	Q137179791	More images
St. Augustine's Chapel	68 Parkhill Road; Halifax NS	44°37′43″N 63°35′50″W	Halifax municipality (2383)	Q137843607	Upload Photo
Building S-27	CFB Halifax; Halifax NS	44°39′32″N 63°35′38″W	Federal (2930)	Q137848468	Upload Photo
Rose Bank Cottage	268 Highway 357; Musquodoboit Harbour NS	44°47′48″N 63°09′31″W	Nova Scotia (3408)	Q137162338	Upload Photo
Musquodoboit Harbour Railway Museum	7895 Highway 7 Musquodoboit Harbour NS	44°54′14″N 62°24′01″W	Musquodoboit Harbour municipality (5334)	Q106596475	More images
Lighttower	Sambro Island NS	44°26′00″N 63°34′00″W	Federal (3204)	Q7409095	More images
Mackey House	1137 Ketch Harbour Road; Ketch Harbour NS	44°29′31″N 63°33′10″W	Nova Scotia (15383)	Q137843604	Upload Photo
Lock #5, Shubenacadie Canal	53 Kings Road; Wellington NS	44°51′50″N 63°37′26″W	Nova Scotia (1788)	Q136802783	Upload Photo
St. James United Church	43 Old Taylor Head Road; Spry Bay NS	44°50′19″N 62°34′59″W	Spry Bay municipality (7249)	Q137843599	Upload Photo
Memory Lane Heritage Village	28 Clam Harbour Road; Lake Charlotte NS	44°45′50″N 62°56′46″W	Lake Charlotte municipality (8044)	Q104970790	More images
782 East Chezzetcook Road	782 East Chezzetcook Road; East Chezzetcook NS	44°43′14″N 63°14′08″W	East Chezzetcook municipality (8046)	Q137843591	Upload Photo
Dorey House	15 Dorey Lane; Queensland NS	44°38′21″N 64°01′02″W	Queensland municipality (7250)	Q137843587	Upload Photo
MacPhee House	22404 Highway 7 Sheet Harbour NS	44°55′39″N 62°32′37″W	Sheet Harbour municipality (10927)	Q6722070	Upload Photo
1991 Prince Arthur Street	1991 Prince Arthur Street; Halifax NS	44°38′28″N 63°36′32″W	Halifax municipality (10459)	Q136815356	More images

== See also ==
- History of Nova Scotia
- History of the Halifax Regional Municipality
- List of National Historic Sites of Canada in Nova Scotia
- List of oldest buildings and structures in Halifax, Nova Scotia
