= Glynmill Inn =

Hotel and historic structure

Coordinates: 48.94905°N 57.9401°W

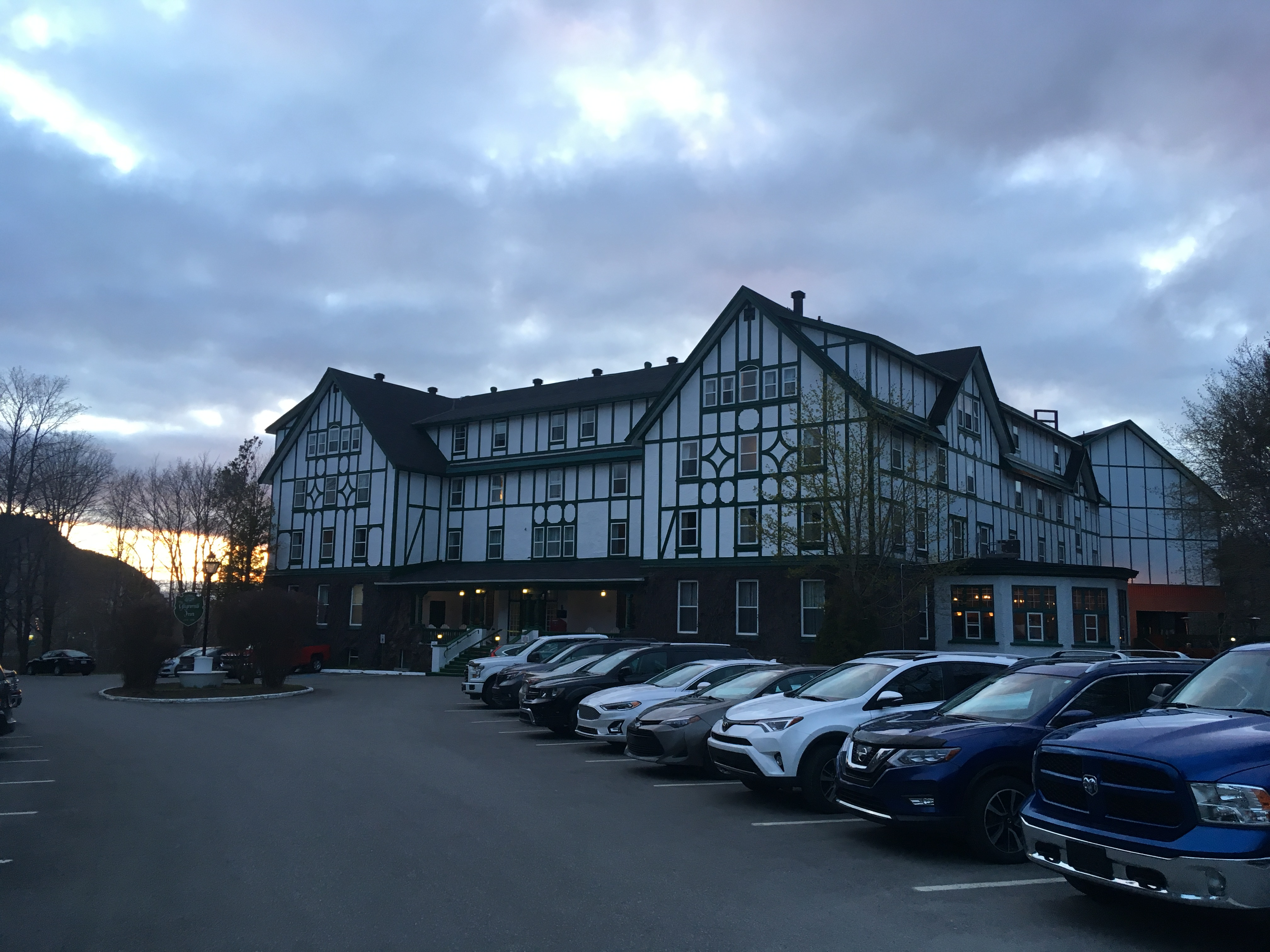
The Glynmill Inn

The Glynmill Inn is a hotel and historic structure located in Corner Brook, Newfoundland and Labrador.

== History ==
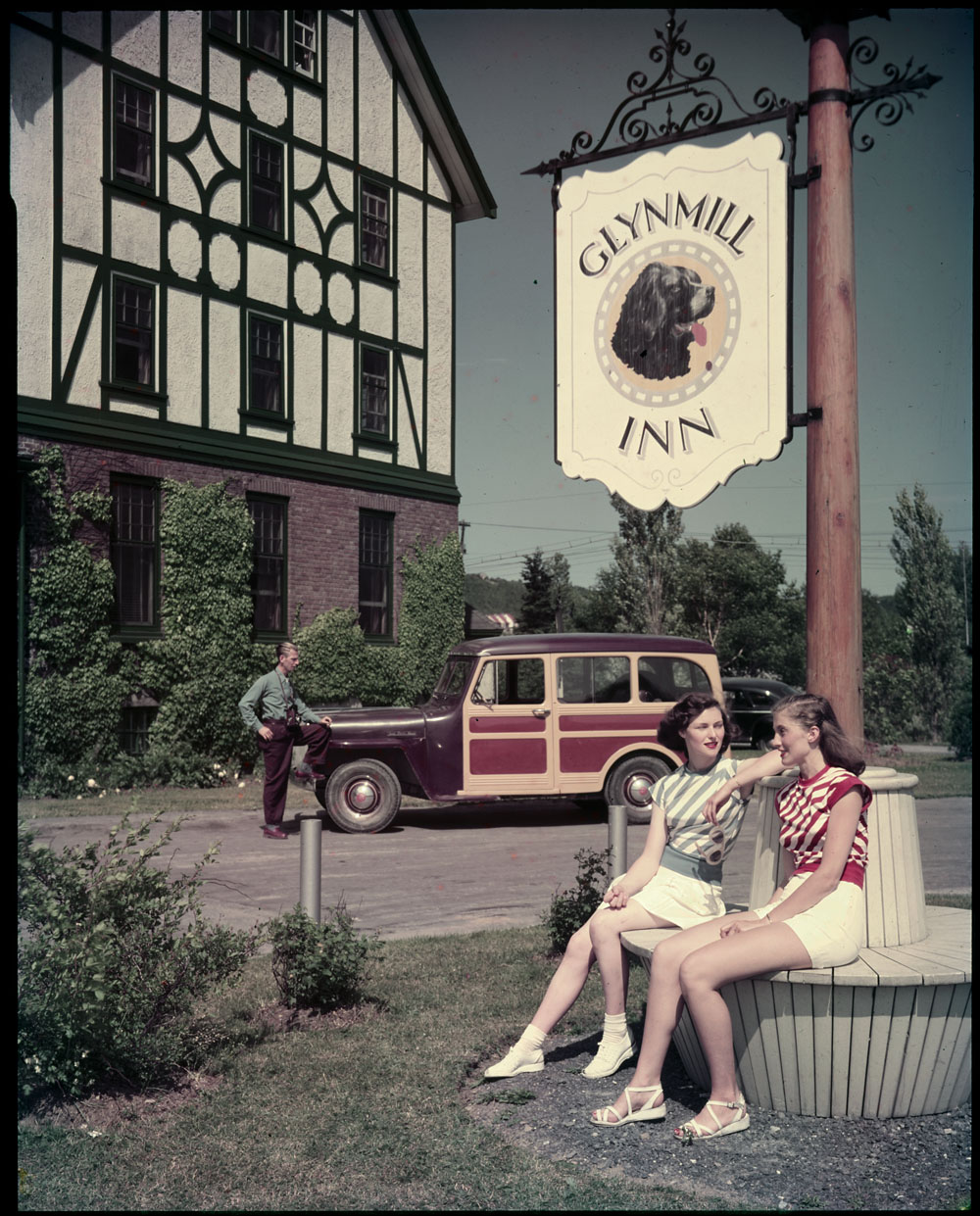
The inn shown circa 1949

The Glynmill Inn was designed and built in 1923 by the prominent Atlantic Canadian architect Andrew R. Cobb. Originally constructed to house employees and senior staff during the construction of the paper mill in Corner Brook, it was converted into a hotel in 1925.

Architecturally, the Glynmill Inn has been recognized as a prominent example of the Tudor Revival style in Newfoundland. In 1974, an additional wing was built onto the rear of the building.

The Inn has played a prominent role in the history of Corner Brook, both architecturally and culturally. In 2001, it was recognized as a Heritage Structure in Newfoundland and Labrador.
