= George Scott (British Army officer) =

British Army officer and colonial administrator

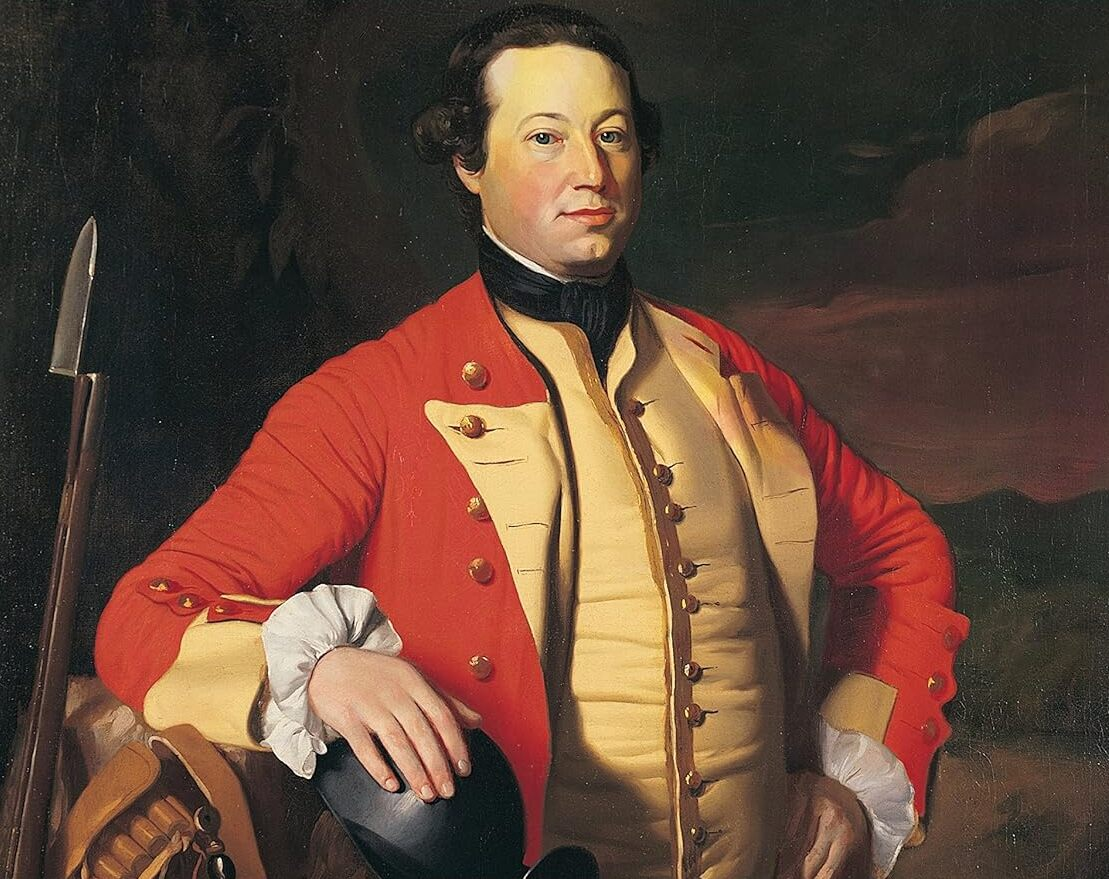
- Portrait by John Singleton Copley, c. 1758
- Died: 6 November 1767
- Military career
- Allegiance: Great Britain
- Branch: British Army
- Service years: 1746–1767
- Rank: Major
- Unit: 40th Regiment of Foot
- Commands: Fort Lawrence
- Conflicts: French and Indian War; Battle of Fort Beauséjour; Siege of Louisbourg; Battle of the Plains of Abraham

Major George Scott (died 6 November 1767) was a British Army officer and colonial administrator who served in Father Le Loutre's War and the French and Indian War.

Scott first served in the 40th Regiment of Foot starting in 1746 and then became captain in 1751. In 1753, he took command of Fort Lawrence. He made contact with French agent Thomas Pichon, who secretly gave information about the Acadians to the British. Scott relinquished command of Fort Lawrence in the autumn of 1754. Preparations were then being made for an attack on Beauséjour, and he was appointed to command one of the two battalions of Massachusetts Governor William Shirley's troops (John Winslow was appointed to the other). He played a considerable part in the brief siege. When Lieutenant-general Robert Monckton departed Beauséjour in November, Scott was left in command in the Chignecto area.

Scott was a commander of light troops and an officer of Major General Peregrine Hopson's 40th Regiment of Foot, and was familiar with irregular tactics. Orders issued on 12 May 1758, stated that "the rangers, and light infantry, appointed to act as rangers, are to be commanded by Major Scott." He was to serve with distinction both during the Siege of Louisbourg (1758) and later with Major General James Wolfe at Battle of the Plains of Abraham. He also was employed in the Petitcodiac River Campaign and the St. John River Campaign against the Acadians.

Scott was given the rank of major in the army effective 28 December 1758. He remained on the list of the 40th Foot as a captain, and evidently was an absentee company commander in the regiment until his death.

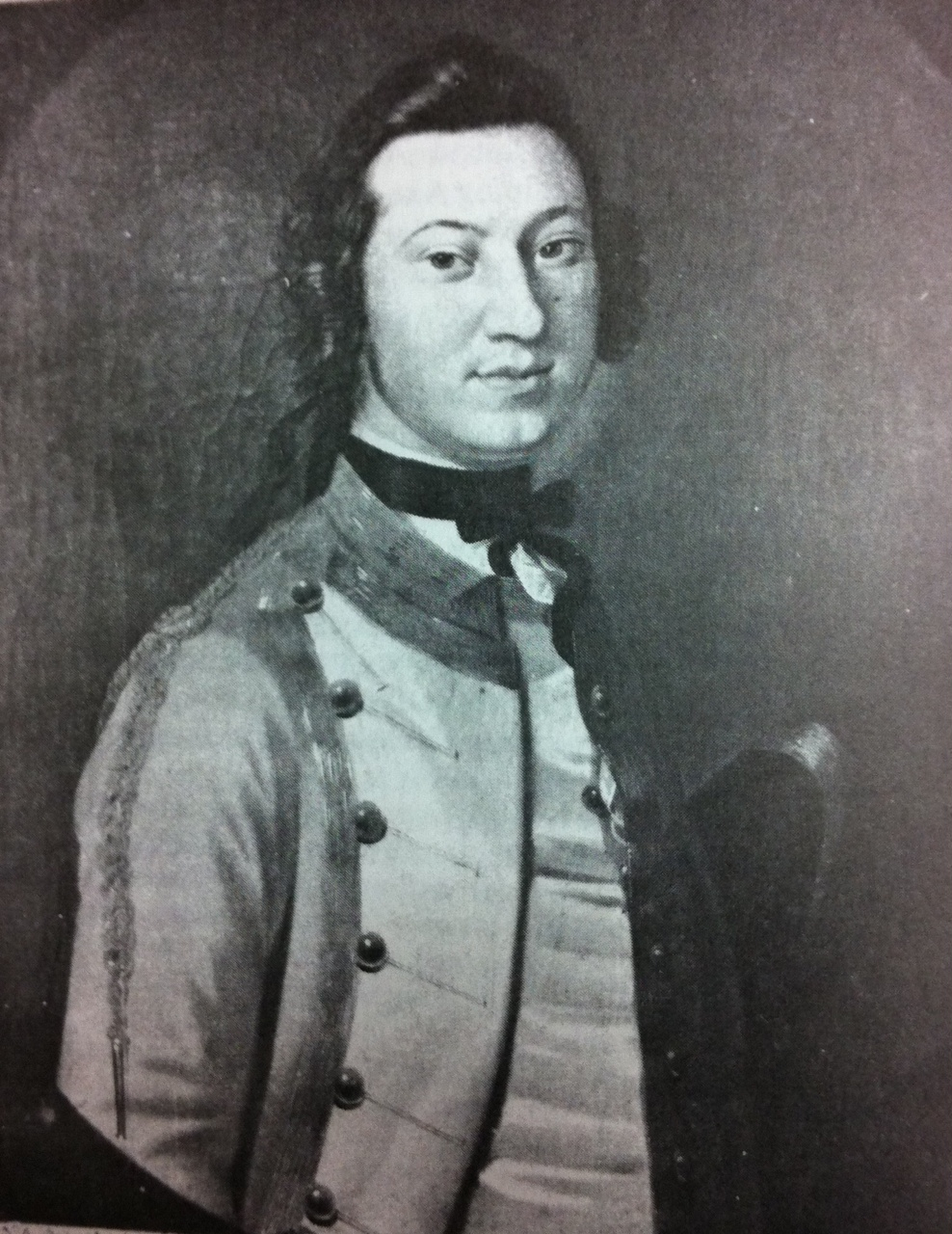
George Scott

Monckton appointed Scott Governor of Grenada. Scott made his will there in December 1764, just before leaving to become acting Governor of Dominica. Scott created a will and left notice that he would be in a duel the following day. Scott was killed or mortally wounded in a duel on 6 November 1767. He left in his will property to his wife Abigail and his father, three brothers (one of whom, Joseph Scott, lived in Halifax at Scott Manor House beside Fort Sackville) and three sisters. A purported miniature of Scott is reproduced in Webster’s Thomas Pichon; it portrays a sharp and rather unpleasant face.

== See also ==
- Military history of Nova Scotia
