= Fort Sackville (Nova Scotia) =

British fortification built in 1749

Coordinates: 44.728°N 63.659°W

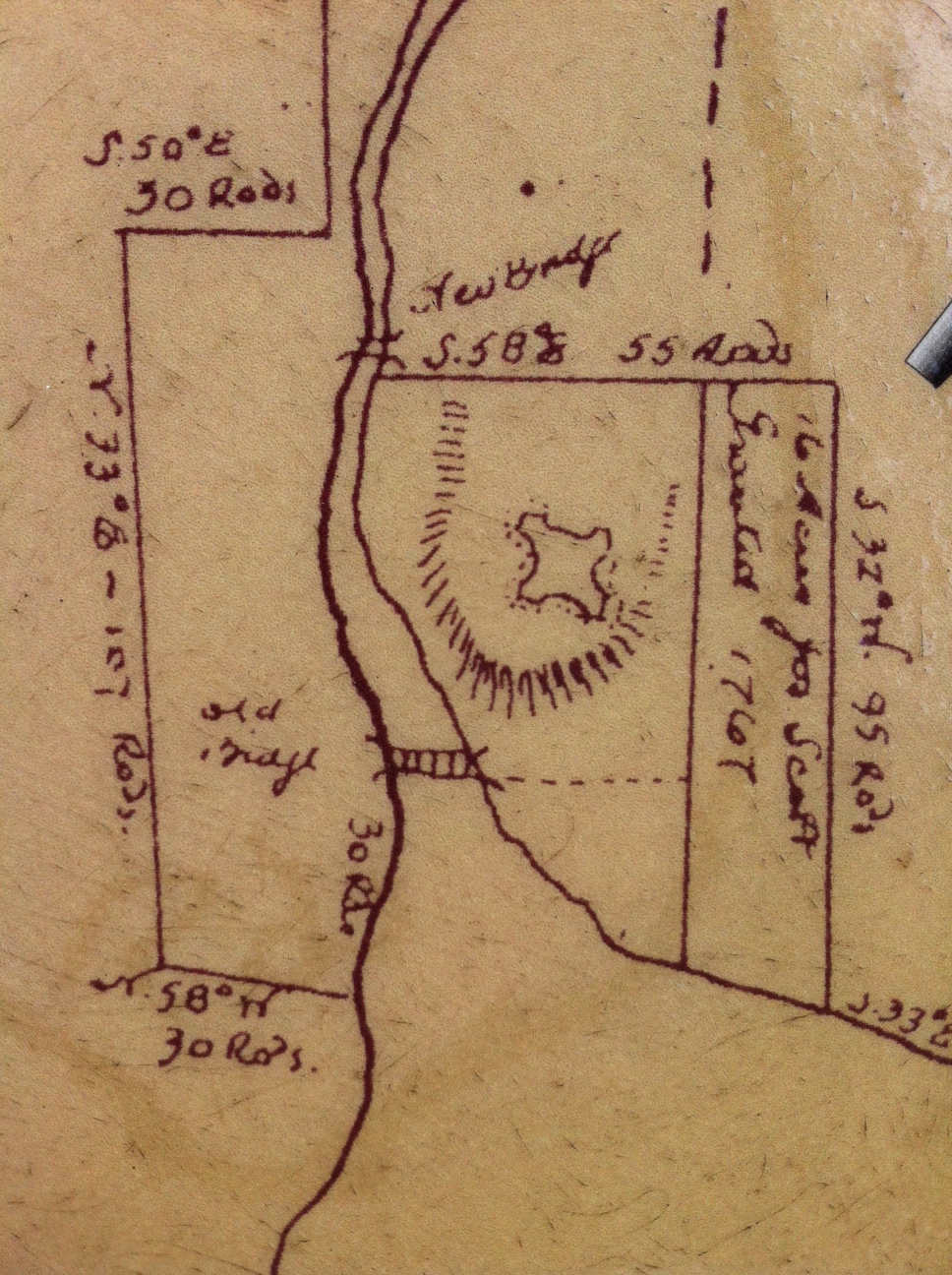
- Established: September 11, 1749
- Location: Bedford, Nova Scotia, Canada
- Founder: John Gorham (military officer)

Fort Sackville was a British fort in present-day Bedford, Nova Scotia. It was built during Father Le Loutre's War (1749-1755) by British adjacent to present-day Scott Manor House, on a hill overlooking the Sackville River to help prevent French, Acadian and Mi'kmaq attacks on Halifax. The fort consisted of a blockhouse, a guard house, a barracks that housed 50 soldiers, and outbuildings, all encompassed by a palisade. Not far from the fort was a rifle range. The fort was named after George Germain, 1st Viscount Sackville.

== Historical context ==
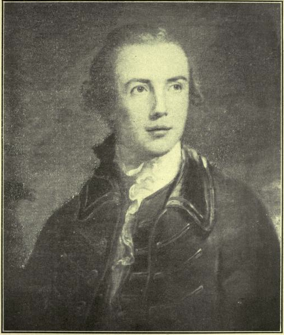
Captain Alexander Murray of the 45th Regiment of Foot

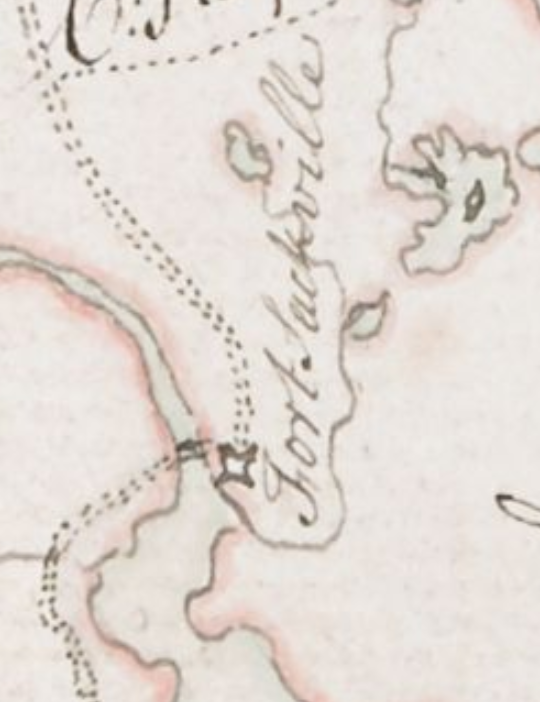
Fort Sackville by John Brewse (inset of A map of the surveyed parts of Nova Scotia, 1756)

Despite the British Conquest of Acadia in 1710, Nova Scotia remained primarily occupied by Catholic Acadians and Mi'kmaq. Father Le Loutre's War began when Edward Cornwallis arrived to establish Halifax with 13 transports on June 21, 1749. The British remained largely in Halifax, having attempted to establish a settlement east of Halifax near present-day Lawrencetown Beach they quickly abandoned the effort due to the threat of Mi'kmaq attacks. Four years after the founding of Halifax, Lunenburg was established. To guard against Mi'kmaq, Acadian and French attacks on the new Protestant settlements, British fortifications were erected in Halifax (Citadel Hill) (1749), Bedford (Fort Sackville) (1749), Dartmouth (1750), Lunenburg (1753) and Lawrencetown (1754).

Within 18 months of establishing Halifax, the British also took firm control of peninsula Nova Scotia by building fortifications in all the major Acadian communities: present-day Windsor (Fort Edward); Grand Pre (Fort Vieux Logis) and Chignecto (Fort Lawrence). (A British fort already existed at the other major Acadian centre of Annapolis Royal, Nova Scotia. Cobequid remained without a fort.)

== Father Le Loutre's War ==
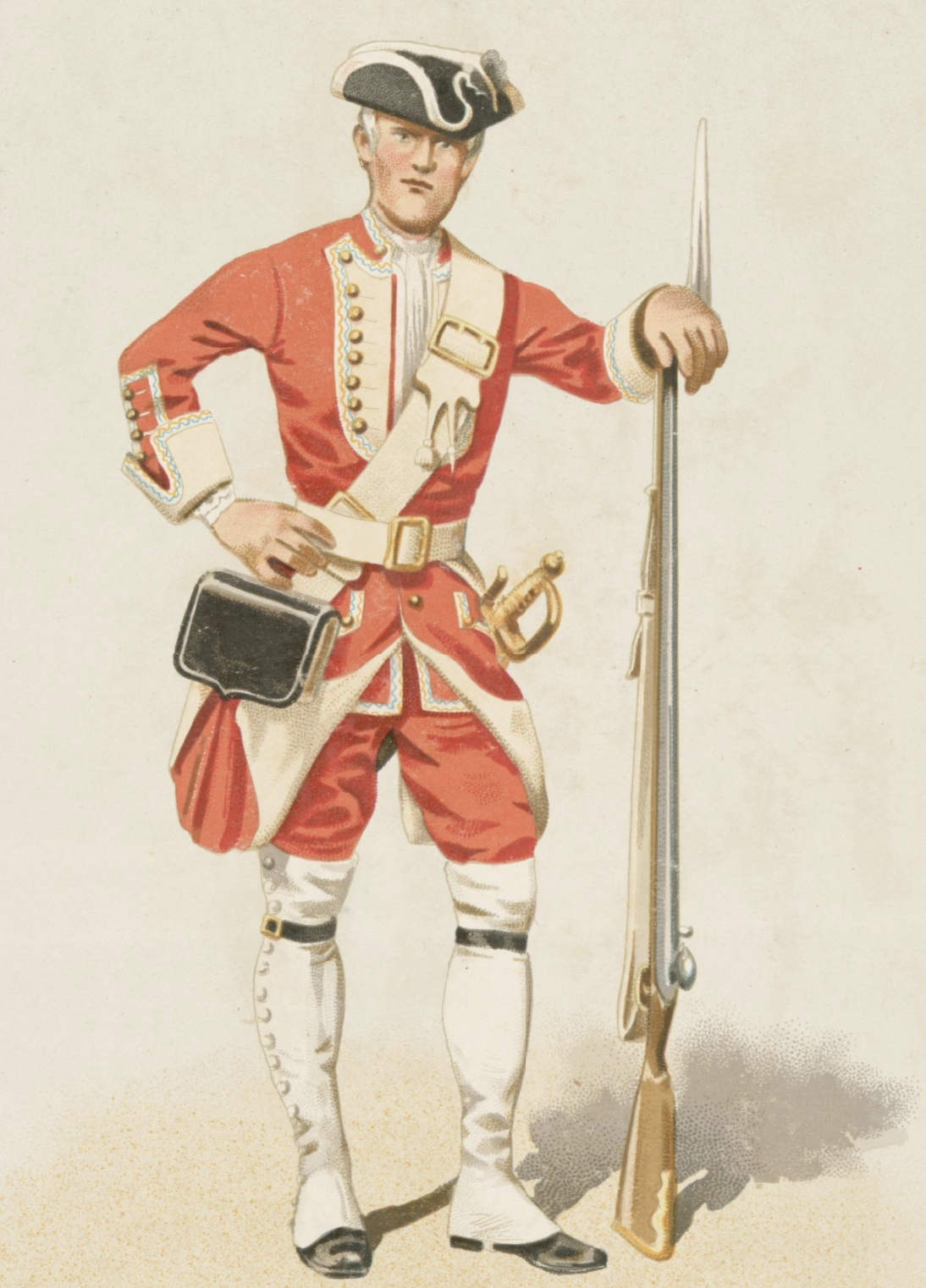
40th Regiment of Foot by David Morier, 1751

On September 11, 1749, Cornwallis sent New England Ranger John Gorham (military officer) to build a fort at the mouth of the Sackville River. The fort was to protect Halifax from attack by the Wabanaki Confederacy, Acadians and French. Gorham's Rangers were primarily natives from Cape Cod, his own hometown. He was sent with an armed vessel that stayed with him as Fort Sackville was built. Five weeks later, on October 17, Cornwallis wrote, "The Posts of the Head of the Bay and Minas are made secure." Lt. Robert Pateshall of the 40th Regiment of Foot was also stationed at the Fort while Gorham used Fort Sackville as his base from which he "scoured the country" for Mi'kmaq scalps as per Cornwallis' bounty set October 1749.

Cornwallis ordered Gorham to Piziquid November 9 in an attempt to relieve the Mi'kmaq and Acadian Siege of Grand Pre. Gorham also oversaw the establishment of a road to Windsor, which was completed by December 17. Gorham left again on January 3, 1750. He was again ordered to Piziquid to build Fort Edward on March 29, 1750. On his way he engaged in the surprise Battle at St. Croix with Mi'kmaq. Gorham had to seek relief from Captain William Clapham who arrived with rangers from Fort Sackville.

In early 1750, Captain Alexander Murray commanded at Fort Sackville (Nova Scotia) and then in September 1751 he was given command of Fort Edward (Nova Scotia).

In August 1750, Cornwallis replaced Gorham at Fort Sackville with Captain Francis Bartelo, who was killed the following month in the Battle at Chignecto. Gorham returned to Fort Sackville by March 1751. In the summer of 1751, Gorham built the first registered vessel in Halifax, a brig he named Osborn Galley at Gorham Point (present-day Halifax Dockyard).

In late September 1752, Mi'kmaq stripped and scalped a man they had caught outside the Palisade of Fort Sackville.

== French and Indian War ==
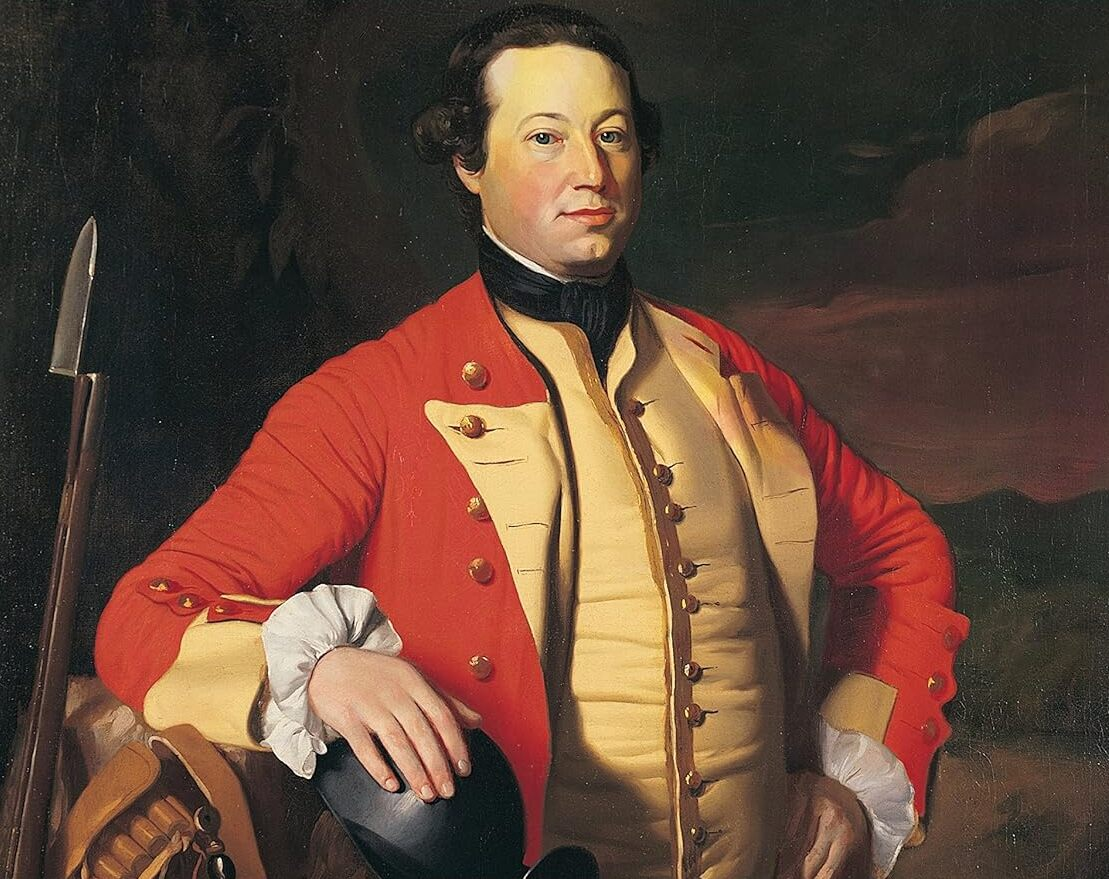
Captain George Scott owned property on which his brother Joseph Scott built the Scott Manor House

During the French and Indian War, in April 1757, a band of Acadian and Mi'kmaq partisans raided a warehouse near-by Fort Edward, killing thirteen British soldiers and, after taking what provisions they could carry, setting fire to the building. A few days later, the same partisans also raided Fort Cumberland. Because of the strength of the Acadian militia and Mi'kmaq militia, British officer John Knox wrote that "In the year 1757 we were said to be Masters of the province of Nova Scotia, or Acadia, which, however, was only an imaginary possession." He continues to state that the situation in the province was so precarious for the British that the "troops and inhabitants" at Fort Edward, Fort Sackville and Lunenburg "could not be reputed in any other light than as prisoners." On 28 September 1759, Mi'kmaw kill two labourers at Fort Sackville.

== American Revolution ==
During this war the Fort was an important way-station between Halifax and Fort Edward in Windsor and points beyond, including Fort Cumberland. As the war went on, the Royal Nova Scotia Volunteer Regiment became competent enough to serve as the garrison of the Fort, under day-to-day command of the senior captain, John Solomon.

== Wars of the French Revolution ==
During most of this period (1793–1802) Fort Sackville was garrisoned by detachments of the Royal Nova Scotia Regiment. On July 1, 1797, 34 officers and men are shown as being on duty.

== Commanders ==
- John Gorham (military officer)
- Robert Pateshall
- Alexander Murray
- Francis Bartelo
- John Solomon
- Joseph Scott (merchant)

== Legacy ==
- Fort Sackville Elementary - Grades Primary and grade one, offers early French immersion
- Fort Sackville Road, Bedford, Nova Scotia

== See also ==
- Military history of Nova Scotia
- Military history of the Mi'kmaq people
- Military history of the Acadians
- History of the Halifax Regional Municipality
