= List of oldest buildings and structures in Halifax, Nova Scotia =

This is a list of oldest buildings and structures in Halifax, Nova Scotia, Canada that were constructed before 1935.

== 1750-1799 ==
Place	Address	Coordinates	Description	Image	Date
St. Paul's Anglican Church	Grand Parade, 1749 Argyle Street		Oldest building in Halifax (1750); Early Palladian church; second and oldest surviving Protestant church in Canada	St. Paul's Anglican Church	1750
Little Dutch (Deutsch) Church	2393 Brunswick Street		Second oldest building in Halifax – Oldest known surviving church in Canada associated with the German-Canadian community, 1756–60	Little Dutch (Deutsch) Church with tombstones in the foreground	1756
Sambro Island Light	Sambro Island, off Highway 349, Sambro		Oldest lighthouse in North America	Sambro Island Light	1758
The Carleton	1685 Argyle Street		Oldest commercial building in municipality; built as residence of colonial administrator Richard Bulkeley	The Carleton	1760
Morris House (Halifax)	2500 Creighton Street		Oldest wooden home in Halifax, moved from its original location at 1273 Hollis Street to avoid demolition.	Morris House	1764
Scott Manor House	15 Fort Sackville Drive, Bedford		Built on the land of Captain George Scott adjacent to Fort Sackville	Scott Manor House	1770
Quaker Whaler House	57 Ochterloney Street, Dartmouth		Nantucket architecture	Quaker Whaler house	1785
Privateer's Warehouse, Historic Properties	1869 Upper Water Street		Commercial grouping reflecting Halifax's 19th century development	Historic Properties Halifax	1790
The Bower (Halifax, Nova Scotia)	5918 Rogers Drive		Brenton Halliburton's home	The Bower (August 2019)	1790
York Redoubt	300 Fergusons Cove Rd, Fergusons Cove		Major seaward defences of Halifax Harbour until World War II	WWII observation posts on shoreline at York Redoubt	1793
Prince of Wales Tower	Point Pleasant Park, 5530 Point Pleasant Drive		Oldest Martello Tower in North America	Prince of Whales Tower	1796
Alexander McLean House	1328-1332 Hollis Street		Georgian-style house, built by a prominent Halifax businessman	1328 Hollis St	1799

== 1800-1849 ==
Place	Address	Coordinates	Description	Image	Date
St. George's Anglican Church / Round Church	2222 Brunswick Street	44°39′12″N 63°34′57″W	Unique Palladian style round church, 1800–12	St. George's Anglican Church	1800
Halifax Town Clock	1766 Brunswick Street	44°38′51″N 63°34′49″W	Three storey, octagonal clock tower, atop clapboard podium of classic Palladian style; commissioned by Prince Edward, Duke of Kent	Town clock at the Halifax Citadel	1803
Prince's Lodge Rotunda	Bedford Highway	44°41′26″N 63°39′34″W	Round summer house, commissioned by Prince Edward, Duke of Kent	Prince's Lodge Rotunda (Music Room)	1794
Government House	1451 Barrington Street		Excellent early Palladian style vice-regal residence	Government House seen from the gates	1805
Royal Artillery Park Officers' Mess	1575 Queen Street		Oldest active military mess in Canada	Royal Artillery Park Officers' Mess	1816
Akins House	2151 Brunswick Street	44°39′12″N 63°34′55″W	A one-and-a-half-storey wood-shingled house originally built for Thomas Beamish Akins, surviving virtually in its original condition; one of the few remaining early 19th-century houses in Halifax and one of the oldest houses in the city	Historic Akins Cottage, 2151 Brunswick Street	1815
Acacia Cottage	6080 South Street		Built in 1816 on Coburg road across from the Waegwoltic Club, within a grove of acacia trees (hence the name). It was later moved up the hill in 1950 (facing demolition) to South street where it now remains.		1816
Province House	1726 Hollis Street		Oldest legislative seat in Canada and site of the country's first responsible government	Province House	1819
Admiralty House	2725 Gottingen Street	44°39′34″N 63°35′34″W	An austere two-storey stone mansion set within the Stadacona site of CFB Halifax which served as the home of Commander-in-Chief of the Royal Navy’s North American station from 1819 until 1904		1819
Black-Binney House	1472 Hollis Street	44°38′38″N 63°34′17″W	A house reflective of the Palladian-inspired residences common during the late 18th and early 19th centuries in Eastern Canada; notable residents include John Black, James Boyle Uniacke and Hibbert Binney	Front facade of Black-Binney House	1819
St. Mary's Basilica, Halifax	1531 Spring Garden Road		Central role in the religious history of Nova Scotia.	St. Mary's Basilica	1820–29
Henry House	1222 Barrington Street		Common 19th century urban type in local ironstone; residence of Father of Confederation, William A. Henry	Henry House	1834
St. George's Anglican Church Rectory (Trinity House)	5435 Nora Bernard Street	44°39′10″N 63°34′59″W	The rectory was built 1838—1840 for the Rev'd Robert F. Uniacke. The truncated pitched roof and central dormer were typical features of late Georgian houses in Halifax.	Rectory of St. George's Round Church	1838

== 1850-1899 ==
Place	Address	Coordinates	Description	Image	Date
Halifax Citadel	5425 Sackville Street	44°38′51″N 63°34′49″W	Restored British masonry fort, constructed between 1828 and 1856.	Town clock at the Halifax Citadel	1856 (completed)
Jonathan McCully House	2507 Brunswick Street		Italianate urban residence of politician and Father of Confederation, Jonathan McCully	Jonathan McCully House	1857
Halifax Provincial Court	5250 Spring Garden Road		Italianate court house.	Front facade of the Halifax Court House	1858
Cast Iron Façade / Coomb's Old English Shoe Store	1883-1885 Granville Street	44°38′59″N 63°34′29″W	A mid-19th-century commercial building with a cast-iron facade; one of the first cast-iron-front structures in Canada and the only building in Halifax known to have a facade composed entirely of cast iron	1883 Granville St	1860
Sandford Fleming House	2549 - 2553 Brunswick Street	44.657811°N 63.588725°W	One-and-a-half Gothic Revival style house, named after the prominent Scottish-Canadian engineer Sir Sanford Fleming who resided in the house from 1866 to 1873.	Sir Sanford Fleming House, Brunswick St., Halifax, Nova Scotia	1860
Welsford-Parker Monument	1541 Barrington Street		Sandstone triumphal arch; only Crimean War monument in North America; frames entry to Old Burying Ground, Halifax's oldest cemetery (1750)	Welsford-Parker Monument at the entrance to the Old Burying Ground in Halifax, Nova Scotia, Canada	1860
Fernwood	6039 Fernwood Lane	44°37′37″N 63°34′55″W	A house on a large landscaped property; a noted example of a Gothic Revival villa in Canada	Fernwood	1860
Art Gallery of Nova Scotia	1723 Hollis Street		Built to house Nova Scotia's pre-Confederation Post Office, Customs House and Railway Department.	Art Gallery	1869 (completed)
Fort Charlotte	Halifax Harbour		Fort Charlotte, together with associated caponiers and outbuildings, form part of original Halifax Defence Complex; access to Georges Island is restricted	Fort Charlotte	1869 (completed)
Halifax Public Gardens bandstand	Spring Garden Road at South Park Street		Henry Busch-designed bandstand centres extensive Victorian-era public gardens, established 1867	Band Shell Halifax Public Gardens	1874-1879
Robertson's Hardware & Warehouse	1675 Lower Water Street		Victorian-style brick commercial complex built in three sections; housed hardware and ship’s chandlery; part of Maritime Museum of the Atlantic	Robertson's Hardware & Warehouse store front, Maritime Museum of the Atlantic	1860-1880
Queen Street fire house	1252 Queen Street		Oldest fire station building remaining in Halifax; now a private residence	1252 Queen St	1877
Halifax Academy	1649 Brunswick Street		Two-and-a-half storey structure built as all-male high school; excellent example of Second Empire style. It was designed by Henry Busch, a proponent of the style, and prominent Halifax architect. Andrew Cobb designed an extension in 1917.	Downtown Halifax (3109962863)	1878
Sir Sandford Fleming Cottage	Sir Sandford Fleming Park, 3 Dingle Road		Rustic, one-and-a-half storey, late nineteenth-century wood framed dwelling. Summer residence and the place of death of Sandford Fleming	Sir Sandford Fleming Cottage, Fleming Park, Halifax	1886
Cambridge Military Library	Royal Artillery Park, 1575 Queen Street		Built to house garrison library collection; oldest library collection in Atlantic Canada	Cambridge Military Library	1886
Halifax City Hall	1841 Argyle Street		Civic symbol on Grand Parade; second Empire style; built of red and cream sandstone with granite construction on ground floor and seven-storey tower	Front facade of the Halifax City Hall	1887
Khyber Building (originally Church of England Institute Building)	1588 Barrington Street		Victorian-Gothic building designed by Henry Busch, as overseen by Bishop Hibbert Binning. Name "Khyber" began to be used in the 1970s after the Khyber Cafe that ran on the 1st floor. This building has been utilized for social activities since its construction when it housed a gym, library, lecture hall, and billiards.	Khyber Club Halifax	1888
St. George's Parish Hall	2221 Maitland Street, Halifax		Built in 1889, and extended in 1910	St. George's Church Hall, northeast view from Maitland Street.	1889 (original structure); 1910 (annex)
Fort McNab	Halifax Harbour	44°36′0″N 63°31′0″W	The remnants of defensive works constructed to defend Halifax when it was one of the principal naval stations of the British Empire; reflective of significant changes in defence technology in the late 19th century	Ruins of Fort McNab	1892 (completed)
G.M. Smith Building	1715-1719 Barrington Street		Four-storey, stone Art Nouveau building to house GM Smith dry goods store. Building restored after deadly fire killed 10 in Kay's Department Store in November, 1950.	G.M. Smith Building	1893
Halifax Armoury	2667 North Park Street		Large, urban, Romanesque Revival drill hall for the active militia, 1895–99	Detail of the Cornwallis Street facade, Halifax Armoury	1899

== 1900-1935 ==
Place	Address	Coordinates	Description	Image	Date
Acadian Recorder Building	1724 Granville Street		Three-storey building of brick, stone and cast iron; eclectic architectural style; final home of one of the province's oldest weekly newspapers (1813-1930)		1900
French Village Railway Station	5401 St Margarets Bay Rd, Upper Tantallon		Built by Halifax and South Western Railway; now houses a cafe		1901
Power House	1606 Bell Road		Rare brick-built home in Queen Anne Revival and Neoclassical styles; housed superintendent of Halifax Public Gardens	1606 Bell St	1903
Churchfield Barracks	2046 - 2068 Brunswick Street		12-unit row house in Gothic style built by British Army	2046 Brunswick St	1903
Shaw Building	1855-1859 Hollis Street		Early 20th-Century Classical-style building; facade only remains	1855 Hollis St	1903
Fire Station 4	1680 Bedford Row		Chicago style fire house with ornamentation, pilasters and Romanesque arches that served originally as equipment doors. Now houses McKelvie's restaurant.	1679 Bedford Row	1906
Halifax Bengal Lancers stables	1690 Bell Road		Concrete two-storey main building with stables, paddock, and riding rings	1690 Bell St	1908
Cathedral Church of All Saints	1330 Martello Street		Largest Anglican Cathedral in Canada. Perpendicular NeoGothic Structure, Ralf Adams Cram Architect		1910
Chebucto School	6199 Chebucto Road		20th century Neoclassical style brick schoolhouse; pressed into service as clinic and morgue following Halifax Explosion of 1917	6199 Chebucto Rd	1910
W.M. Brown Building	1549-51 Barrington Street		Victorian-style, three-storey commercial structure		1910-11
Pacific Building	1537 Barrington Street		Built in Neoclassical style to house YMCA; later offices of Canadian Pacific Railway		1911
Memorial Tower (The Dingle)	Sir Sandford Fleming Park, Armdale		Building led by Sir Sandford Fleming to commemorate 150 years of representative government in Nova Scotia		1912
Tramway Building	5212 Sackville Street		Five-storey Neo-Gothic style building housed offices of the Halifax Electric Tramway Company	5212 Sackville St	1916
Hydrostone District	Bordered by Novalea Drive, Duffus, Young, and Isleville Streets		Public housing in Garden Suburb style; part of reconstruction of city's North End following Halifax Explosion of 1917	Shops and streetscape in Halifax's Hydrostone district	1917-20
Musquodoboit Harbour Railway Station	7895 Highway 7, Musquodoboit Harbour		Built by Canadian National Railway; excellent example of 20th-century railway station design; now a museum	MusquodoboitRailwayMuseum2	1918
Halifax Relief Commission Building	5555 Young Street		2.5-storey Tudor style building housed agency providing relief to victims of 1917 Halifax Explosion	5555 Young St	1920
Halifax Forum	2901 Windsor Street		Sports arena featured first artificial ice surface east of Montreal	2901 Windsor St	1927
Pier 21	1055 Marginal Road		Highly specialized building type related to early 20th-century Canadian immigration and post war immigration	Front facade of Pier 21	1928
Halifax Station and hotel complex	1161 Hollis Street	44.6398°N 63.569113°W	Beaux-Art sandstone head house built by Canadian National Railway with adjoining hotel; Bush-style train shed was demolished before 1990.	Gare de Halifax, août 2016 01	1928
The Bank of Nova Scotia Building	1709 Hollis Street		Built as bank's main branch; one of the finest examples of Art Deco architecture in Canada	Bank of Nova Scotia building – Halifax, NS – (2018-08-27)	1931
Dominion Public Building	1713 Bedford Row		At 13-stories, Art Deco structure was highest in the city prior to 1960; built as Depression-era relief project	Dominion Public Building, Halifax	1935

== See also ==
- History of Nova Scotia
- List of historic places in Halifax, Nova Scotia
- List of National Historic Sites of Canada in Nova Scotia
- List of historic places in Nova Scotia
- List of oldest buildings and structures in Toronto
- History of the Halifax Regional Municipality
- List of oldest buildings in Canada
