= Khyber =

Khyber may refer to:

== Places ==
- Khyber Pass, a mountain pass that links Afghanistan and Pakistan
- Khyber District, a district of Khyber Pakhtunkhwa, Pakistan
- Khyber Pakhtunkhwa, a province of Pakistan
- Khaybar, an oasis in Saudi Arabia
- Khyber Rock, a suburb of Johannesburg, South Africa

== People ==
- Khyber Shah, Pakistani boxer
- Mir Akbar Khyber, Afghan leftist

== Other uses ==
- Khyber train safari, a tourist train in Pakistan
- Khyber Pass Railway, a railway line in Pakistan
- Khyber Pass Economic Corridor, an infrastructure and economic corridor between Afghanistan and Pakistan
- Khyber, a character from Ben 10: Omniverse
- The Khyber, a multipurpose arts centre in Halifax, Nova Scotia, Canada
  - Khyber Arts Society, which operates the Khyber Institute of Contemporary Art at the above arts centre
- Khyber Mail (newspaper), a daily newspaper that was published from Peshawar in the Khyber Pakhtunkhwa province of Pakistan (ceased publication in 2004)
- Khyber Mail (passenger train), a passenger train in Pakistan
- Khyber Medical College
- Khyber Afghan Airlines

== See also ==
- Carry On Up the Khyber, a 1968 film in the Carry On series
- "Up the Khyber", a 1969 instrumental song by Pink Floyd
- Khyber, a character in Ben 10: Omniverse
- Kyber, a post-quantum encryption system
- Kyber (scheduler), a computing I/O scheduler
- Kyber crystal, fictional crystals in Star Wars
- Khabur (disambiguation)
- Khaybar (disambiguation)
