= Henry Busch =

Henry Busch may refer to:

- Henry Busch (architect)
- Henry Busch (serial killer)
