= James J. Bremner =

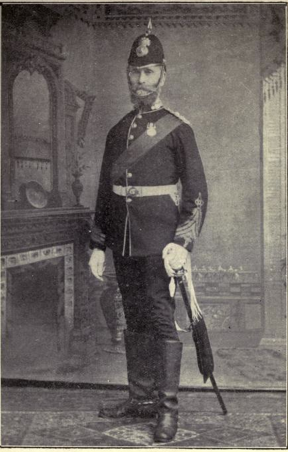
Lieutenant-Colonel James J. Bremner

James J. Bremner (b. 1832) was a prominent military figure in Nova Scotia. He was active in repelling the Fenian Raids (1866–1871). He later led Halifax Provisional Battalion to the North-West Rebellion (1886). He was also a member of the North British Society. Sir Sandford Fleming served under him as a private.

== Gallery ==
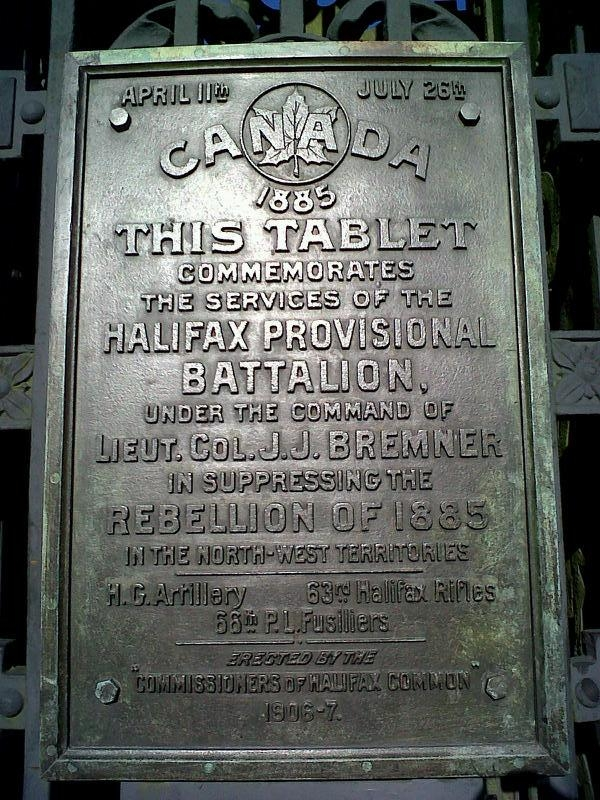
Plaque commemorating Bremner and the Halifax Provisional Battalion, Halifax Public Gardens

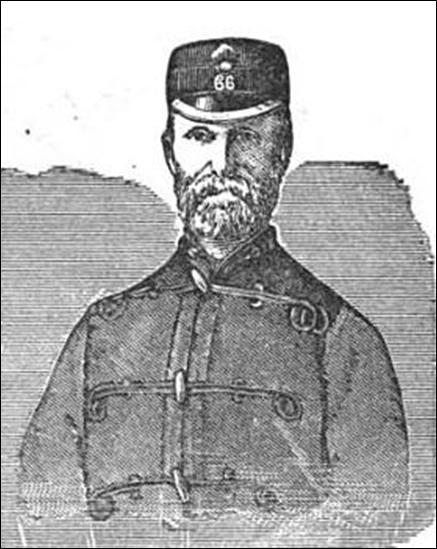
Lieutenant-Colonel James J. Bremner

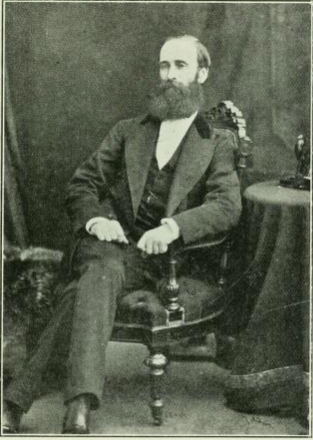
James J. Bremner

== See also ==
- Military history of Nova Scotia
- History of the Halifax Regional Municipality
- Militia Act of 1855
