= Khaybar (disambiguation) =

Khaybar or Khaibar may refer to:

- Khaybar, an oasis in Medina Province, Saudi Arabia
- Khaibar (Hunza), a village in Gilgit−Baltistan, Pakistan
- Khaibar-1, a Syrian-made rocket widely used in the 2006 Lebanon War by Hezbollah against Israel
- KH-2002 Khaybar, an Iranian bullpup assault rifle
- PNS Khaibar (1956), a British Battle-class destroyer of the Pakistani Navy sunk by Indian forces during the Bangladesh Liberation War in 1971
- PNS Khaibar (1989), an American guided-missile frigate in service with the Pakistani Navy from 1989 to 1993
- PNS Khaibar (1994), a British destroyer acquired by the Pakistani Navy in 1994 and designated as a Tariq-class warship

== See also ==
- Battle of Khaybar, a military engagement between the early Muslims and the Khaybari Jews in 628 CE
  - Khaybar Khaybar ya yahud, an antisemitic chant referencing the battle
- Ka-Bar, a combat knife first used by the United States military in 1942
- Khyber (disambiguation), a semi-homonymic alternative spelling for other entities
