= The Khyber =

The Khyber Building
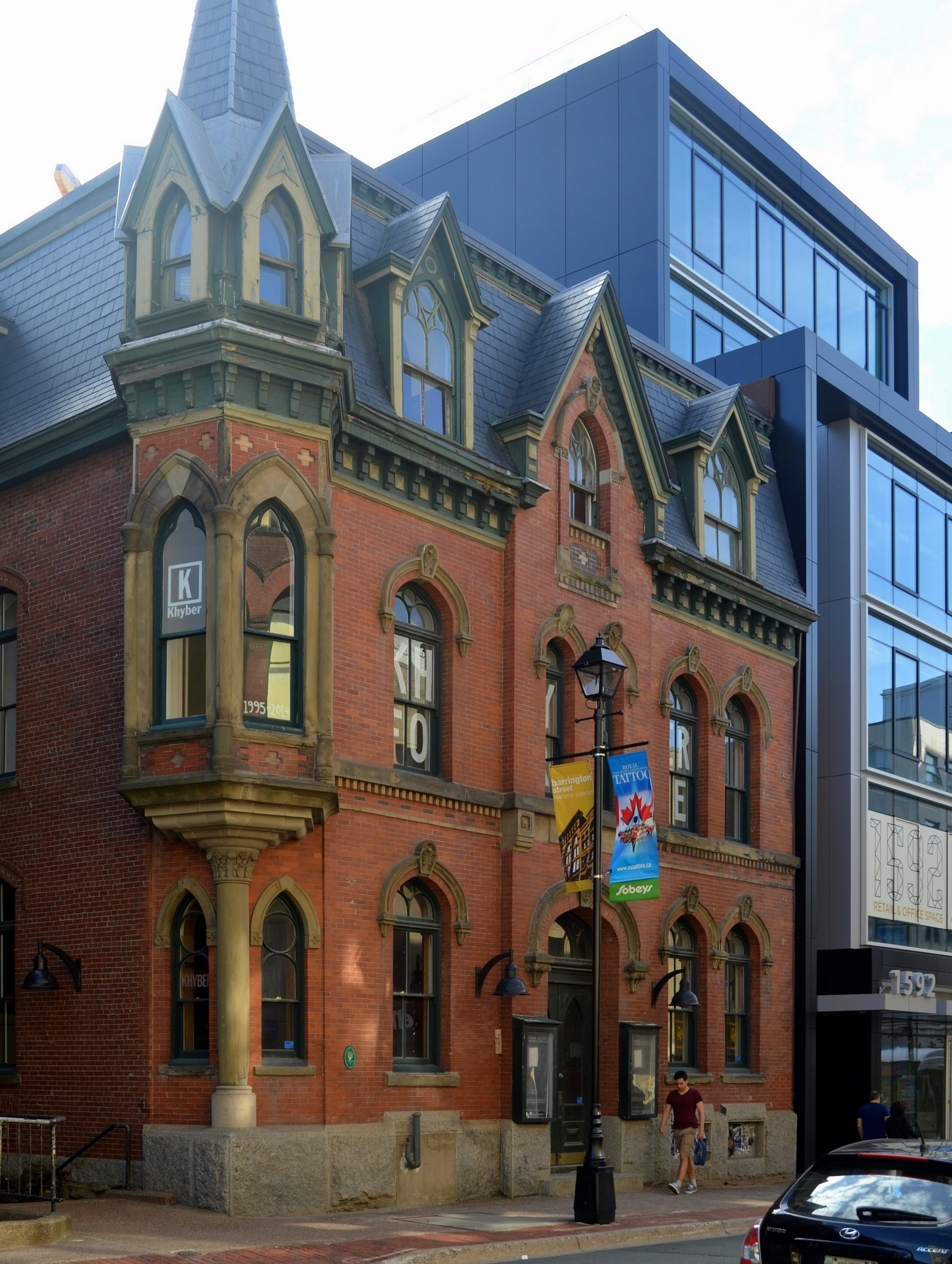
- Khyber Building, 2015
- Interactive map of The Khyber Building
- Location: Downtown Halifax

Construction
- Opened: 1888

Website
- www.khyber.ca

The Khyber Centre for the Arts (est. 1995) is a queer-led artist-run centre located in downtown Halifax NS. The centre presents non-commercial artwork, offers a self-led platform for artists and their practices, and aims to disrupt systemic causes of exclusion, tokenism, and power imbalances in the arts. The centre is currently located at 1880 Hollis St.

== History ==
The Khyber was born at 1588 Barrington Street, a registered Historical Property previously owned by the Halifax Regional Municipality. 1588 Barrington Street was originally erected as The Church of England Institute in 1888. It was designed by architect Henry Busch in the Victorian style with Gothic Revival features. The building was commissioned by Bishop Hibbert Binney. Other buildings designed by Busch in Halifax include the Halifax Academy and the Halifax Public Gardens Bandstand.

In 1994, the City of Halifax put out an RFP (Request for Proposal) for the building, but only received a few offers. Its current tenants helped form the Arts Centre Project Society in order to secure the building as an arts centre. The Arts Centre Project Society was made up: the No Money Down Cultural Society (a group of artists active in building), various individual artists (including Garry Neill Kennedy), and members from the Heritage Trust of Nova Scotia. The building was established as an art centre by City Council in 1994 and a month-to-month lease was signed.

In March 1995, the Khyber Arts Society was registered as a charitable organization and opened the Khyber Centre for the Arts, an artist-run centre dedicated to contemporary art presentation and social function. Recent NSCAD grad Kelly Mark ran the bar on the first floor for several years. Phil Grauer who went on to form Canada Gallery NYC served as director. Founding tenants included Chesnut Tree Theatre (Jennifer Smith) and Ultramagnetic recording studio run by Charles Austin (Superfriendz) and Kevin Lewis (Parenthesis gallery). Artists that have shown at the Khyber since then include: Luis Jacob, Emily Vey Duke & Cooper Battersby, Gillian Wearing, Kelly Mark, David Askevold, Shary Boyle, Gerald Ferguson, Alison Mitchel, Thierry Delva and the Critical Art Ensemble. The Rankin Family filmed the music video for their song "You Feel The Same Way Too" at the Khyber in the mid 1990s.

In 1997, the Khyber Arts Society signed a five-year renewable lease with the City to occupy the Khyber Building.

In 1998, the Khyber Club opened as a meeting place for the visual arts community and as a music venue. Visiting musicians include Canadian recording artists Joel Plaskett, Sloan, Eric's Trip, Elevator to Hell, Al Tuck, Soaking Up Jagged, Rick of the Skins, Julie Doiron, Jenn Grant, Old Man Luedecke, Tanya Davis, Buck 65, Skratch Bastid, Classified, and Ghettosocks.

In April 2014, Halifax Regional Municipality closed the building due to building code violations and the presence of asbestos. The building's most recent occupancy consisted of the Khyber Arts Society, as well as the Heritage Trust of Nova Scotia.

Funding of $200,000 was provided in March 2023 by the Federal Government and $250,000 by the municipality to the new owners, the Barrington Street Building Preservation Society, to assist in remediation and development of the space for use by the Khyber Centre for the Arts. The Society anticipates the project will require $3.5 million total funding to complete.

== See also ==
- Down at the Khyber, a 2001 album by the Joel Plaskett Emergency
