= Khabur (disambiguation) =

Khabur is the name of two rivers:

- Khabur (Euphrates), largest perennial tributary to the Euphrates in Syria
- Khabur (Tigris), river that rises in Turkey and flows through Iraq to join the Tigris at the tripoint of Turkey, Iraq and Syria

== See also ==
- Khabur Guards
- Khyber (disambiguation)
