= Alexander McLean House =

Historic building in Halifax, Nova Scotia

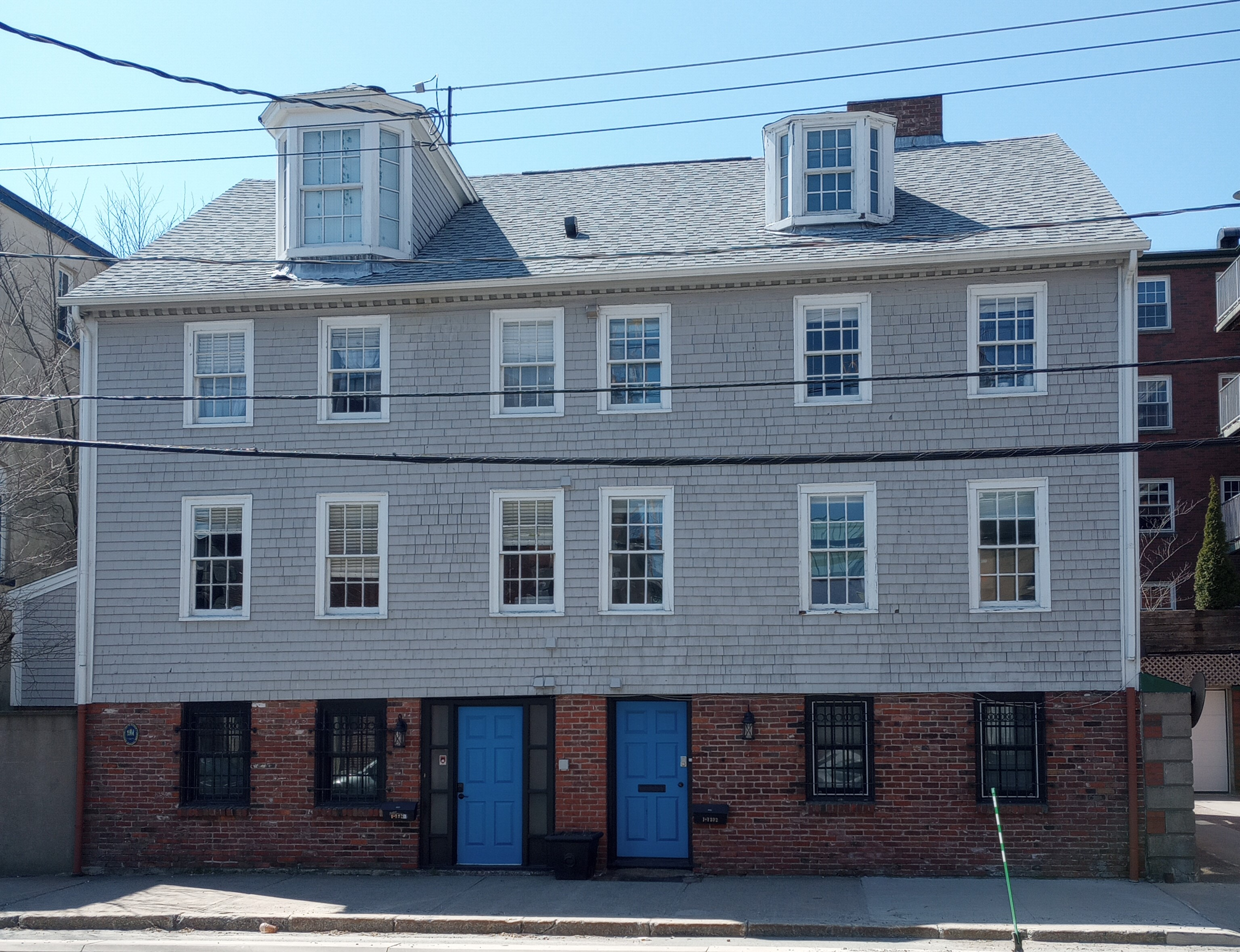
- Interactive map of the Alexander McLean House area

General information
- Status: Completed
- Architectural style: Georgian architecture
- Location: 1328 - 1332 Hollis Street, Halifax, Nova Scotia, Canada
- Coordinates: 44.6488°N 63.5741°W
- Construction started: c. 1797-98
- Completed: 1799

Design and construction
- Designations

Nova Scotia Heritage Property Act
- Type: Municipally Registered Property
- Designated: May 1, 1987

The Alexander McLean House or Alex McLean House is a heritage property in Halifax, Nova Scotia, Canada, and one of the oldest residences in the city.

== Location ==
Located in downtown Halifax, the house is situated on 1328-32 Hollis Street.

== History ==
The structure was first built in 1799. It was commissioned by Halifax businessman Alexander McLean, a partner in Gouge & Pryor, a West Indies trading firm linked to London, Barbados, Trinidad, and St. Vincent. Following McLean's death, the Georgian-style house was later divided for McLean's granddaughters in 1828 and converted into apartments by 1982.

Listed on the Canadian Register of Historic Places, it became a registered heritage property within the Halifax Regional Municipality in 1987.

== Architecture ==
Featuring Georgian architecture, the Alexander McLean House stands two and a half stories tall, with six bays, a high brick foundation, and a steeply pitched gable roof. The wood-shingled exterior features four Scottish dormers, two on each side.

== See also ==
- List of oldest buildings and structures in Halifax, Nova Scotia
- History of the Halifax Regional Municipality
