= Halifax Alehouse =

Bar and restaurant in Halifax, Canada

Coordinates: 44°38′44.96″N 63°34′33.61″W

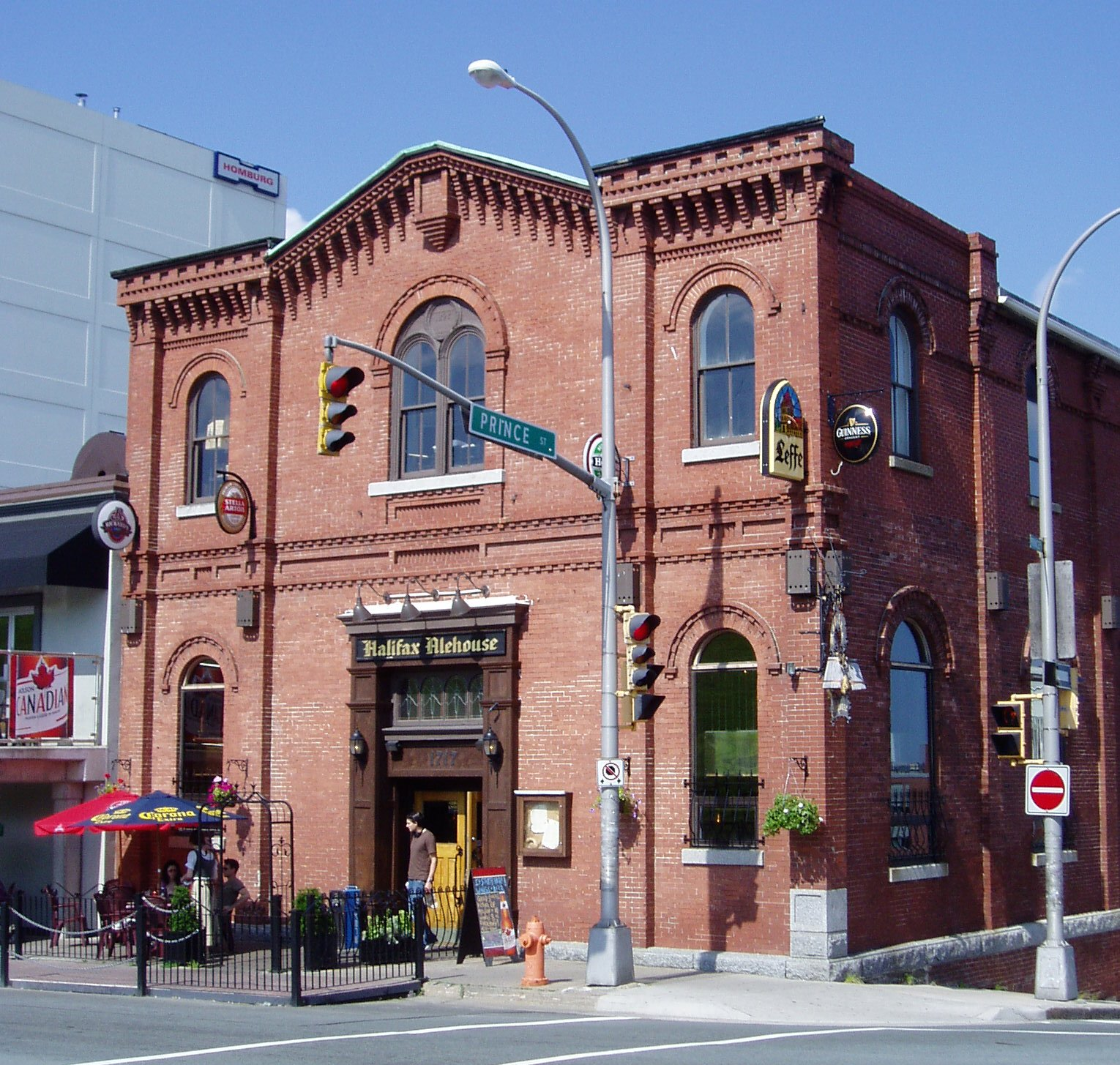
- Brunswick Street facade

General information
- Architectural style: Second Empire
- Location: 1717 Brunswick Street; Halifax, Nova Scotia
- Construction started: 1893
- Completed: 1895
- Owner: Jehad Khoury Holdings Ltd. (as of 2019)

Design and construction
- Architect: Henry Busch

The Halifax Alehouse is an historic, brick building originally built for the Salvation Army on Brunswick Street in downtown Halifax, Nova Scotia. The building is located at the base of the Halifax Citadel and hosts a bar/restaurant.

== Salvation Army Citadel ==
The building was the Salvation Army's first permanent temple in Halifax, and was constructed on the site of the Mackenzie Temperance Reform Club, a group that promoted abstinence from alcohol. The Reform Club building was occupied by the Salvation Army from 1892 to 1893 before it was demolished.

Construction of the Salvation Army Citadel temple was started in 1893 and completed in 1895. It served as the headquarters and central place of worship for the Salvation Army in Halifax until 1961 when a new temple was constructed on Barrington Street.

The building was designed by architect Henry Busch, and uses multi-wythe load-bearing brick walls. It is considered an example of the Second Empire architectural style with Gothic Revival influences.

== Bar and restaurant ==
The building has contained a bar and restaurant for several decades. In the 1990s, it was home to Jerry's Pub. As of December 2019, the building was owned by Jehad Khoury Holdings Ltd.

=== Halifax Alehouse ===
The most recent iteration, the Halifax Alehouse, is modeled as a traditional Maritime brew pub, with décor that emphasizes history and tradition, and a staff that wears period costumes. The bar is known for its wide range of East Coast beers (with 29 on tap). The menu is traditional pub fare, but specializes in Belgian mussels. The bar also hosts live music, especially from Celtic derived bands.

Bands who have played the Alehouse include Satori, The Frequency, Shameless, Ten Mile House, Kapyr (10 years of Wednesdays), The Persuaders, The Morning After, "The Legendary" Frankie Deuce, Frisky Biscuit, UP, Green with Envy, Merimac.

The Halifax Alehouse is owned by Michel and Marcel Khoury, while Peter Zed is the recognized agent of the business under Nova Scotian law.

=== Human rights complaint ===
The Halifax Alehouse was the subject of a human rights complaint in relation to a 2010 incident in which a 32-year-old black patron, Dino Gilpin, was asked to leave after the bar refused to accept his citizenship card as a valid form of identification for the purpose of purchasing an alcoholic drink. After he refused to leave, the Halifax Alehouse phoned police, who arrested Gilpin and charged him with public drunkenness. In 2013, the Nova Scotia Human Rights Commission ruled that the Halifax Alehouse racially discriminated against him in phoning the police. The commission also found that Gilpin was not intoxicated.

In 2014, the Halifax Alehouse was ordered to pay damages to Gilpin, and to have all staff and management educated about racial profiling.

=== Allegations of violence ===
Halifax Alehouse security staff have been involved in various violent incidents. In 2009, a scuffle between photography students and a Halifax Alehouse bouncer on the public sidewalk outside the bar made local news.

Following a December 2022 homicide (see below), The Coast reported on a man who said he was beaten by multiple Halifax Alehouse staff on 25 June 2022 in the venue's back stairwell, out of view of other patrons, after being escorted out of the bar by three bouncers. The man said he suffered numerous injuries including a fractured rib, but decided not to press charges due to personal circumstances. The Halifax Alehouse did not respond to the newspaper's repeated inquiries.

On 14 August 2022, Addisiane Freeland was "badly beaten by bouncers at the Alehouse", according to local media. A notice of action filed against the Alehouse in relation to this incident alleged that multiple bouncers inflected physical injury and psychological trauma on the man. A video allegedly depicting the assault was posted to social media website Reddit. The video shows a man being punched multiple times while not moving, being pinned to the ground by several people.

Halifax police charged two staff of the Halifax Alehouse, Matthew Day and Alexander Levy, with assault in relation to another incident that took place on 10 October 2022. A man, who was being restrained outside the bar by Alehouse staff when police arrived, alleged that he had been assaulted by them. Speaking to CBC News, the man said he had been told to leave without being given a reason, and was escorted out of the bar. He recounted that once outside the bar he turned to leave, but was attacked by multiple bouncers and was beaten and choked unconscious on the sidewalk. The two bouncers are scheduled to face trial in 2024.

On 24 December 2022, Ryan Michael Sawyer died in hospital, after an incident that took place outiside the Halifax Alehouse. Sawyer was visiting Halifax to watch the 2023 World Junior Ice Hockey Championships. The Nova Scotia Medical Examiner Service ruled Sawyer's death a homicide. In August 2023, Alehouse bouncer Alexander Levy was charged with manslaughter and criminal negligence causing death in relation to the death of Ryan Michael Sawyer.

A complaint filed on 25 December 2022 with the provincial Alcohol, Gaming, Fuel and Tobacco Division alleged that staff of the Halifax Alehouse have been, for the past several years, "overly eager to resort to violence".

=== Government response to violent incidents ===
CBC News reported that Nova Scotia justice minister Brad Johns requested a review of the regulations governing bar security following the death of Ryan Sawyer. Service Nova Scotia minister Colton LeBlanc, who oversees the Alcohol, Gaming, Fuel and Tobacco Division, stated, "we've taken the acts of violence that we've seen very seriously". On 12 May 2023, the province announced new rules for bars with cabaret licences that allow them to remain open until 3:30 am, including the Halifax Alehouse and adjacent HFX Sports Bar & Grill. Security staff will need to take an online training course and provide a criminal record check upon request.

Later in May 2023, the province charged the Halifax Alehouse for violating the Liquor Control Act. The Alcohol, Gaming, Fuel and Tobacco Division alleges that the bar allowed activity "detrimental to the order of the control of the premises" and failed to report criminal charges resulting from activities "on or around its property". A provincial officer stated that the investigation covered an "ever-growing" number of incidents, beyond those that took place on October 10 and December 24 of the previous year. The case will be considered by the Nova Scotia Utility and Review Board.
