= Charles James MacDonald =

Canadian politician

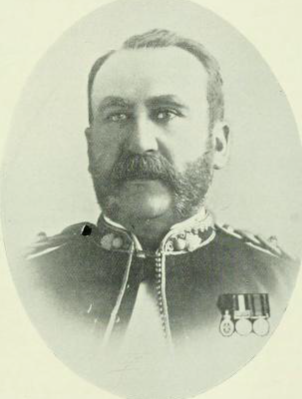
Charles J MacDonald

Charles John MacDonald (April 4, 1841, Halifax, Nova Scotia – October 12, 1903, Halifax, Nova Scotia) was a lawyer and political figure in Nova Scotia, Canada. He represented Halifax County in the Nova Scotia House of Assembly from 1878 to 1879 as a Liberal-Conservative member. He was a member of the North British Society.

== Biography ==
He was born in Halifax, the son of Robert MacDonald, an immigrant from Scotland. MacDonald was educated at Dalhousie College and was called to the Nova Scotia bar in 1872. He married Mary Tamson Evens. He later married Annie McLearn after the death of his first wife. MacDonald was lieutenant-colonel in the militia and served in the Halifax Provisional Battalion during the North-West Rebellion. He also served on Halifax city council. MacDonald was a prominent member of the Freemasons. He resigned his seat in the provincial assembly in 1879 after he was named post office inspector for Halifax.
