= Halifax Provisional Battalion =

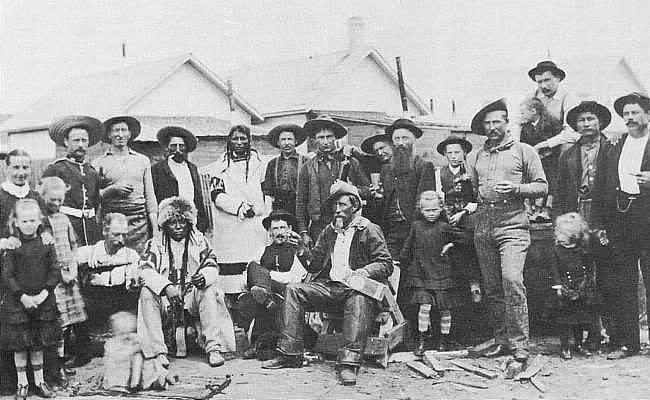
- Halifax Provisional Battalion, Medicine Hat, District of Assiniboia (1885)
- Active: 1885
- Disbanded: 1885
- Country: Canada
- Branch: Canadian Militia
- Type: Provisional battalion
- Role: garrison unit
- Size: 6 infantry companies and 2 artillery companies
- Part of: Non-Permanent Active Militia; Alberta Field Force
- Engagements: North-West Rebellion
- Battle honours: North West Canada, 1885

Commanders
- Notable commanders: Lieutenant-Colonel James J. Bremner

The Halifax Provisional Battalion was a military unit from Nova Scotia, Canada, which was sent to fight against the North-West Rebellion in 1885. The battalion was under command of Lieutenant-Colonel James J. Bremner and consisted of 350 soldiers made up three companies from the 66th Princess Louise Fusiliers, three companies of the 63rd Halifax Rifles (formerly the Halifax Volunteer Battalion), and two companies of the 1st "Halifax" Brigade of Garrison Artillery, with 32 officers. The battalion left Halifax under orders for the North-West on 11 April 1885, and they stayed for almost three months.

The battalion was assigned garrison duty along the Canadian Pacific Railway main line that stretched across the prairies. After a short stay in Winnipeg, the battalion was broken into four components and sent to Moose Jaw, Swift Current, Saskatchewan Landing and Medicine Hat. Soldiers had to remain on high alert because of possible raids on their positions.

Prior to Nova Scotia's involvement in putting down the rebellion, the province remained hostile to Canada in the aftermath of how the colony was forced into Canada. The celebration that followed the Halifax Provisional Battalion's return by train across the county ignited a national patriotism in Nova Scotia. Prime Minister Robert Borden, stated that "up to this time Nova Scotia hardly regarded itself as included in the Canadian Confederation... The rebellion evoked a new spirit... The Riel Rebellion did more to unite Nova Scotia with the rest of Canada than any event that had occurred since Confederation." Similarly, in 1907 Governor General Earl Grey declared, "This Battalion... went out Nova Scotians, they returned Canadians." The wrought iron gates at the Halifax Public Gardens were made in the battalion's honour.

== Swift Current ==
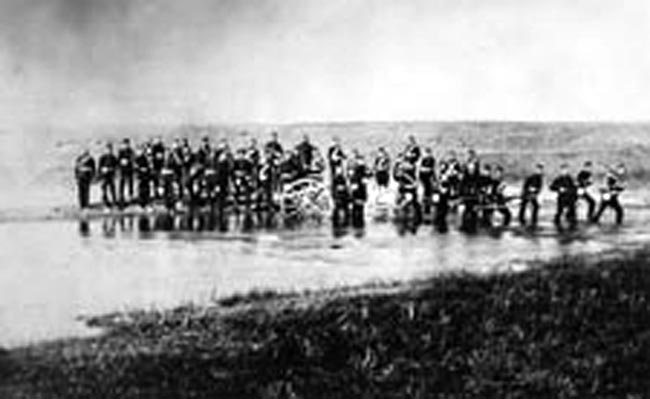
Provisional Halifax Battalion at Swift Current

After eleven days on the train, the battalion arrived at Winnipeg, Manitoba, on 22 April, at 5 a.m. On the 29th the battalion received orders to go to Swift Current, District of Assiniboia, and marched on same day at 4 p.m. The battalion arrived at Swift Current at 8 p.m. on the 30th, and the next day it camped beside the 7th Battalion Fusiliers and a portion of the Midland Provisional Battalion.

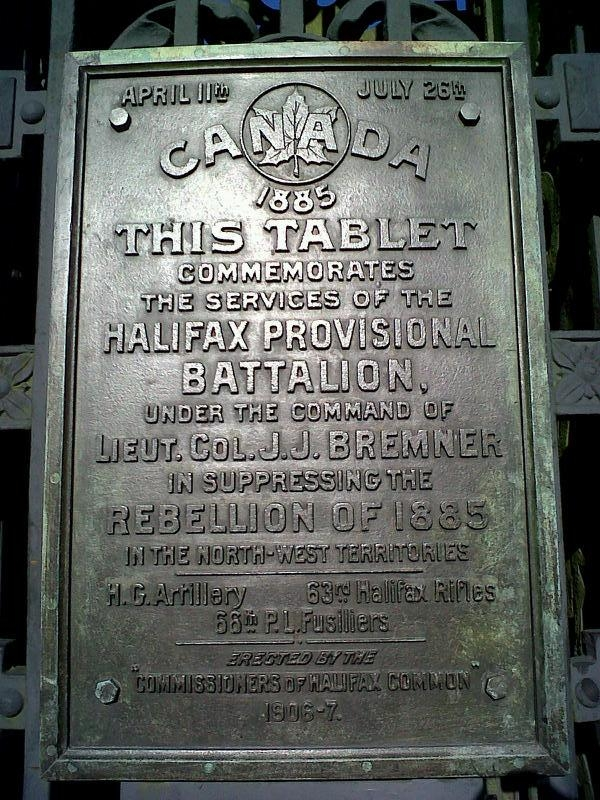
Halifax Provisional Battalion Plaque, Main Gate, Halifax Public Gardens: wrought iron gates made in tribute to the Battalion

== Medicine Hat ==
On 5 May a telegram was received to hold the 63rd contingent of the Halifax Provisional Battalion in readiness to repel an uprising of the Blackfoot and other Indians. Further, the battalion was warned of a possible attack on Medicine Hat, District of Assiniboia. As a result, the headquarters of the Halifax Provisional Battalion with the 66th contingent was ordered to Medicine Hat, where it arrived early the next morning. Also encamped on the South Saskatchewan River was a company of Stuart's scouts (the Rocky Mountain Rangers), a body of mounted cowboys. All the parties remained at Medicine Hat until the end of the rebellion.

== Saskatchewan Landing ==
Shortly after the headquarters of the battalion left Swift Current for Medicine Hat two companies of the 63rd contingent were ordered to Saskatchewan Landing, where they were employed loading scows, forwarding supplies, and assisting in transporting across the river.

== Moose Jaw ==
One company of the 63rd and the Halifax Garrison Artillery remained at Swift Current whilst it continued to be the base of supplies. The troops moved to Moose Jaw when it became the base, and the two companies from the Saskatchewan Landing shortly afterwards joined them. On these two detachments fell the labour of handling and transferring all the supplies going to the front, and furnishing the necessary guards, so that they were kept fully employed, at times of necessity the non-commissioned officers voluntarily doing the fatigue duties of privates. The men expected that their work was the prelude to being allowed to take part in the fighting at the front, as other corps preceding them had been relieved in due order. To the disappointment of many of the battalion, the war finished before they were required to go to the frontline.

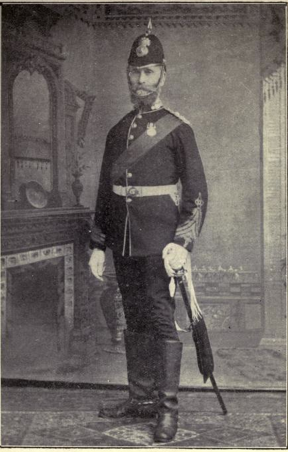
Lieutenant-Colonel James J. Bremner

== Aftermath ==
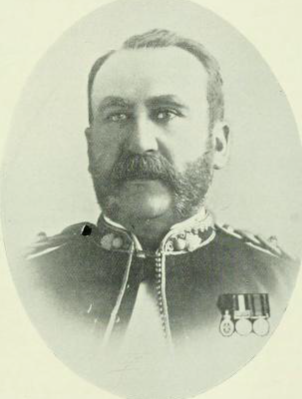
Charles James MacDonald

The headquarters of the Halifax Provisional Battalion left Medicine Hat on the night of 30 June, and arrived at Moose Jaw early on 2 July, the battalion being now re-united entire. After remaining at Moose Jaw a week the battalion was ordered to Winnipeg, where it arrived on 10 July, and went into camp.

The battalion left Winnipeg on 10 July for Halifax. Along the entire route the battalion was met with "continued ovation; the kindness of the people of the towns of Manitoba, Ontario and Quebec being beyond description". The reception at Halifax two weeks later on July 24 was "most enthusiastic, the whole population apparently having turned out."

== See also ==
- Military history of Nova Scotia
- History of the Halifax Regional Municipality
- Militia Act of 1855
