= Quaker Whaler House =

House in Dartmouth, Nova Scotia, Canada

Coordinates: 44°40′01″N 63°34′06″W

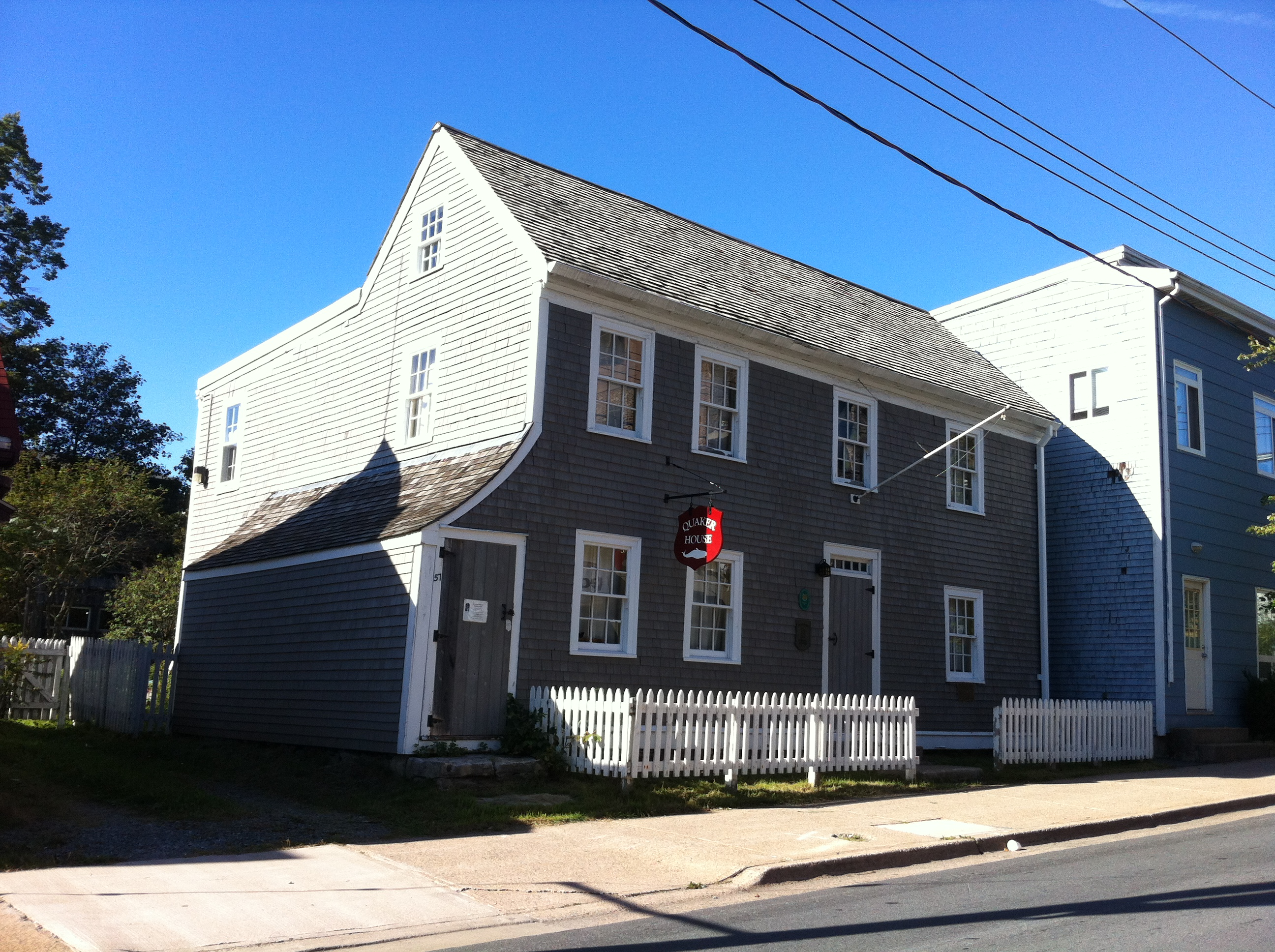
Quaker Whaler House Dartmouth Nova Scotia

The Quaker Whaler House is the oldest building in Dartmouth, Nova Scotia (1785). Built by William Ray, a Quaker and cooper from Nantucket who moved to Dartmouth in 1785-86 as a whaler. Its materials and construction methods closely resembles Quaker architecture in Nantucket, such as the asymmetrical facade design and stone foundation. The Quakers settled in Dartmouth for six years (1786-1792) before many of them left for England. The most well-known Quaker was abolitionist Lawrence Hartshorne.

== See also ==
- Lawrence Hartshorne's house
- List of oldest buildings and structures in Halifax, Nova Scotia
- History of the Halifax Regional Municipality
- List of oldest buildings in Canada
