= John Black (merchant) =

Canadian merchant and politician

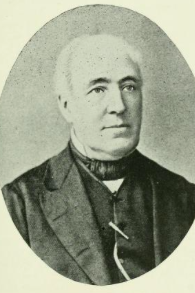
- Hon. John Black, Black-Binney House, Halifax, Nova Scotia
- Born: c. 1765; Aberdeen, Scotland
- Died: 1823 (aged 57–58); Aberdeen, Scotland
- Occupation(s): Merchant and politician
- Spouses: Mary McGeorge; Catherine Billopp
- Relatives: William Black (brother); Christopher Billopp (father-in-law); James Boyle Uniacke (son-in-law)

John Black (c. 1765 – 4 September 1823) was a Scottish merchant and politician in New Brunswick. He served as the representative for Northumberland County in the Legislative Assembly of New Brunswick from 1793 to 1795.

Born in Aberdeen, John Black arrived in Saint John, New Brunswick, in 1785, initially serving as an Admiralty agent. He also acted as an agent for Blair and Glenie, a Scottish firm engaged in timber trading. By 1787, Black ventured into business independently in Saint John. Later, his brother William and two cousins joined him in the business. Black diversified his interests by engaging in the trade of salted fish with the West Indies and establishing his own trading fleet, consisting of at least nine vessels. Black encouraged the local production of hemp to manufacture cordage for ship use.

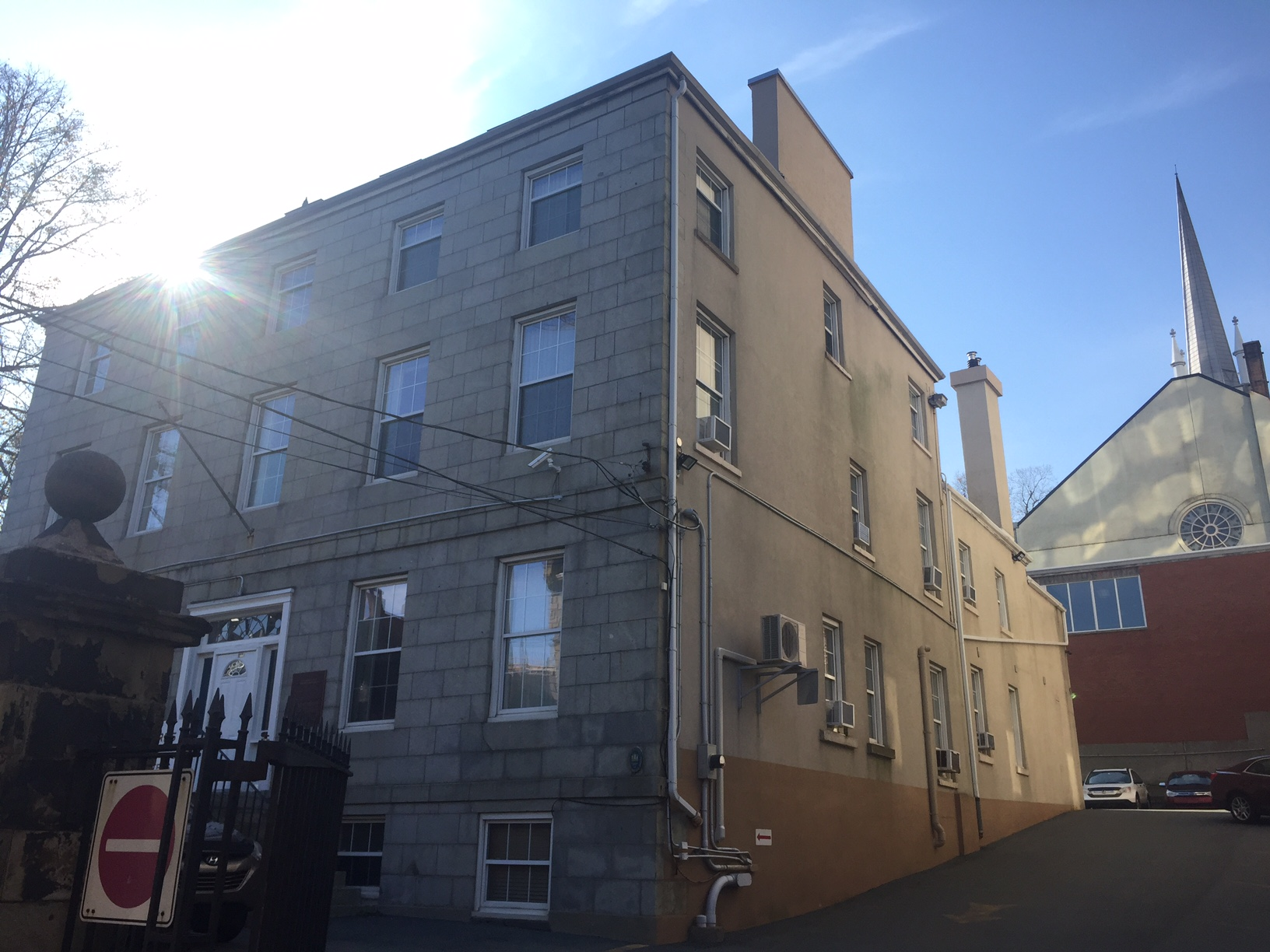
Black-Binney House, Halifax, Nova Scotia

In 1806, he moved to Halifax, Nova Scotia. Black assumed the role of president of the North British Society in 1809. Additionally, in 1813, he was appointed to the Nova Scotia Council. Black was married twice: first to Mary, the widow of John McGeorge, in 1797, and later to Catherine, the daughter of Christopher Billopp, in 1807. Black constructed what is now known as the Black-Binney House, displaying influences from contemporary Scottish and Aberdonian architecture of the time. After suffering poor health later in life and travelling to Britain in hopes of a cure, Black died in Aberdeen.

His daughter Rosina Jane married James Boyle Uniacke.

== See also ==
- List of oldest buildings and structures in Halifax, Nova Scotia
