= Clonard Keating =

Canadian soldier in Nigeria

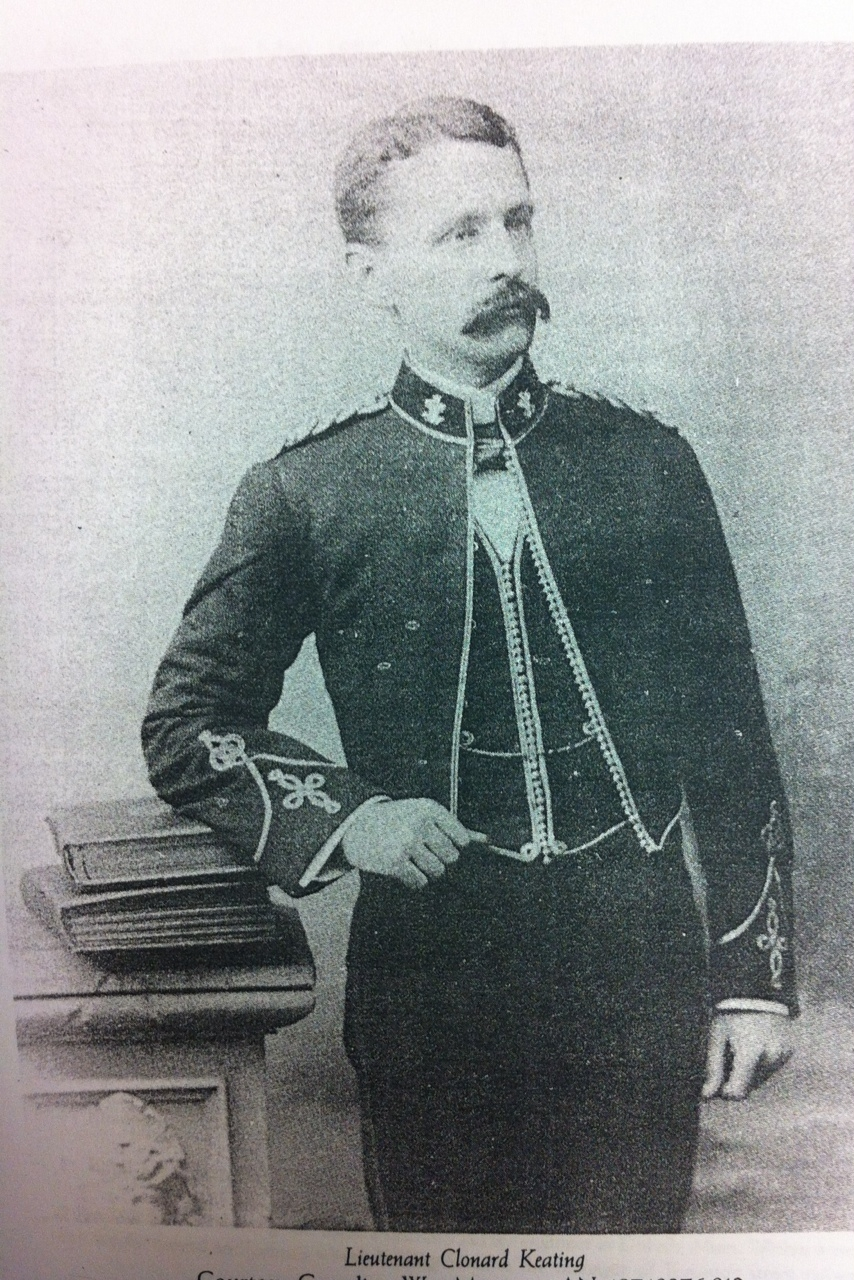
Clonard Keating

Henry Edward Clonard Keating (13 December 1871 – 9 October 1898) was a Nova Scotian and celebrated military officer who served Royal West African Frontier Force on Niger River in Nigeria (British West Africa) during the Scramble for Africa. Clonard was killed in the line of duty.

== Career ==
Keating began in the Prince of Wales's Leinster Regiment. From there he requested to be seconded to the West African Frontier Force. As part of the 1st Battalion, Lieut. Keating arrived at Lokoja on 2 May 1898. He made the trek up river approximately 400 miles to Lafagou, reaching his destination on 12 September 1898. By October, the attrition rate was reported to be 63% of the Europeans, officers and NCOs, dead or invalided home because of the climate and disease.

Keating had 22 men from which to command a sixty mile district from Lafagu, Nigeria to Rofia and Illah. He was stationed in Lafagu and every six weeks had to visit Rofia and Illecon. He took his first tour of inspection of his own-river posts early in October. When it came time to return to Lafagu, on October 9, Keating went with 14 of his troops to the island village of Hela, near Yelwa, for additional canoes. The tribe refused Keatings request. In response, Keating killed the king of the village, expropriated the canoes he needed, and abducted the men required to work them. The villagers attacked Keating with bows and arrow and spears. Keating and his men returned fire. Keating's troops soon ran out of ammunition. A hand to hand fight ensued in which a number of Keating's party were killed on shore before a remnant of the party was finally able to embark. Then the men who had been impressed into service overturned the canoes. The villagers pursued in canoes, throwing spears and shooting arrows at the fleeing patrol. Keating was wounded five times when finally he was killed by a spear to his head. The rest of the patrol was also killed except for two native soldiers who were severely wounded. In response to the killings, colonial troops arrived at Hela the following week, on 16 October 1898, and attacked and razed the village.

== Commemorations ==
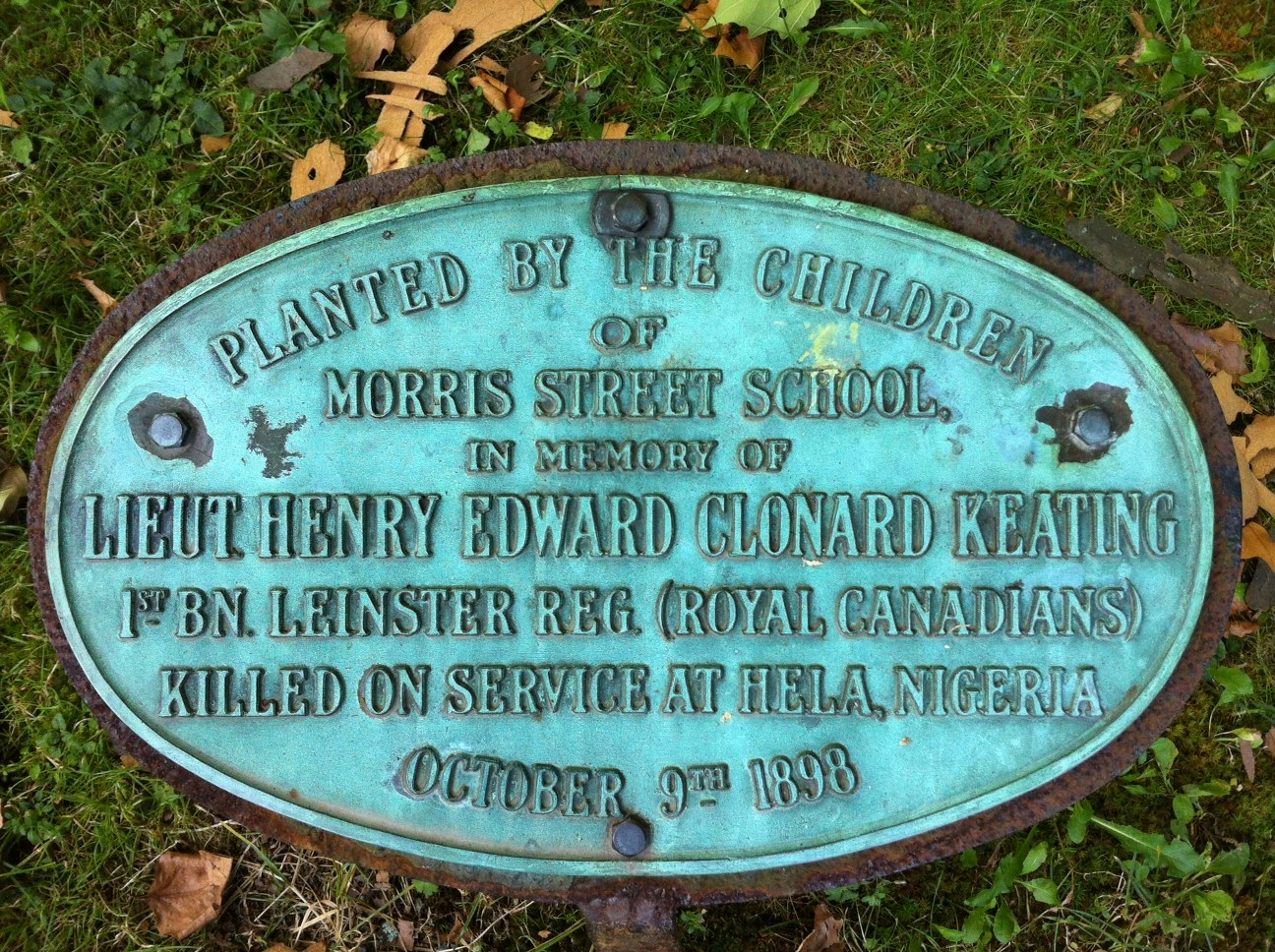
Clonard Keating Plaque, Halifax Public Gardens, Nova Scotia

Keating's body was eventually recovered.and buried in the new British fort at Yelwa, a half mile away from Hela. At Keating's gravesite, Keating's comrades built a memorial with a brass plaque and a tablet erected. (There is also a tombstone for Keating at Saint James Cemetery in Toronto.)

The incident received significant coverage. In Halifax, on Arbor Day, 8 May 1899, the teachers and pupils of Morris Street School, Keatings alma-mater, planted a tree in his memory in the Halifax Public Gardens. General Lord William Seymour, commanding the British troops, gave an address. An easel was set up in front of the tree bearing pictures of both Queen Victoria and Keating, the whole draped in the Leinsters' colours. The Herald headline declared "Planted a Tree for Halifax Hero". In 1925, a marker was installed at the tree.

In 1900 a memorial plaque was unveiled to honour Keating in Saint Luke's (Anglican) Cathedral, Halifax, subsequently lost to fire. A second plaque was put up in the parish church at Birr, Ireland (where the Leinsters' depot was located) to honour Keating and other Leinsters killed in Africa the same year. At Aldershot, England, Keating's name was included on a tablet to the memory of all the men of the West African Frontier Force who died or were killed in Nigeria.

== See also ==
- Military history of Nova Scotia
- William Grant Stairs
