= Black-Binney House =

Historic house in Halifax, Nova Scotia

Coordinates: 44°38′38″N 63°34′17″W

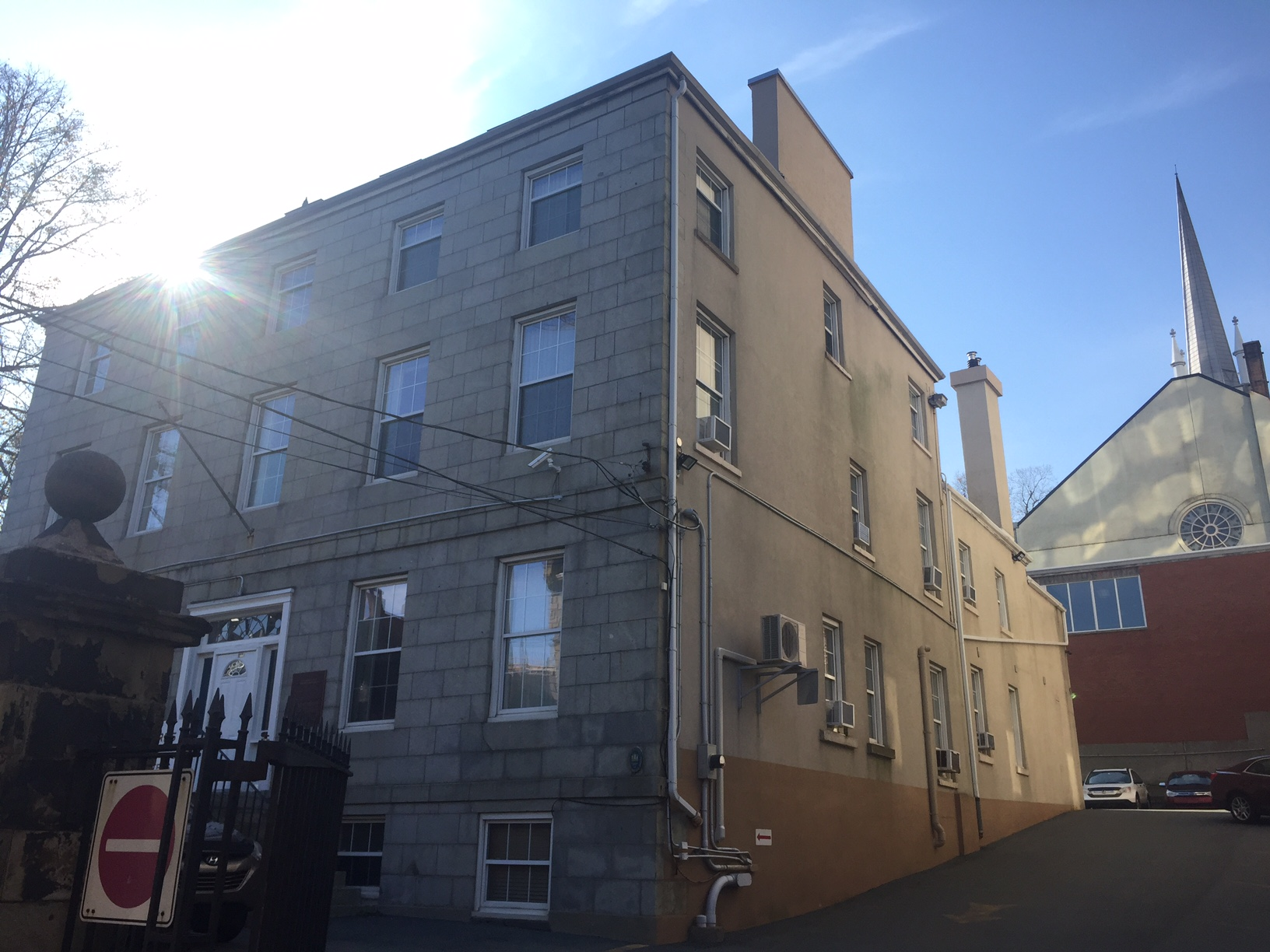
Black-Binney House, Halifax, Nova Scotia (St. Matthew's Church in background)

The Black-Binney House was a former residence built in 1819 in Halifax, Nova Scotia which is now a National Historic Site of Canada. The house was built by John Black (merchant) and is reflective of the Palladian-inspired residences common during the late 18th and early 19th centuries in Eastern Canada. In 1857, Hibbert Binney subdivided the property to build the St. Matthew's United Church (Halifax). In 1965 Sidney Culverwell Oland purchased and renovated the building to house the Nova Scotia Division of the Canadian Corps of Commissionaires.

== 19th-century residents ==
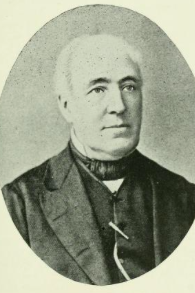
John Black, d. 1823

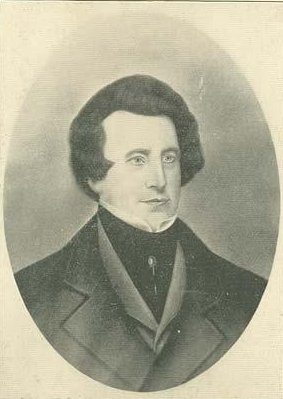
James Boyle Uniacke, first premier of Nova Scotia, d 1858

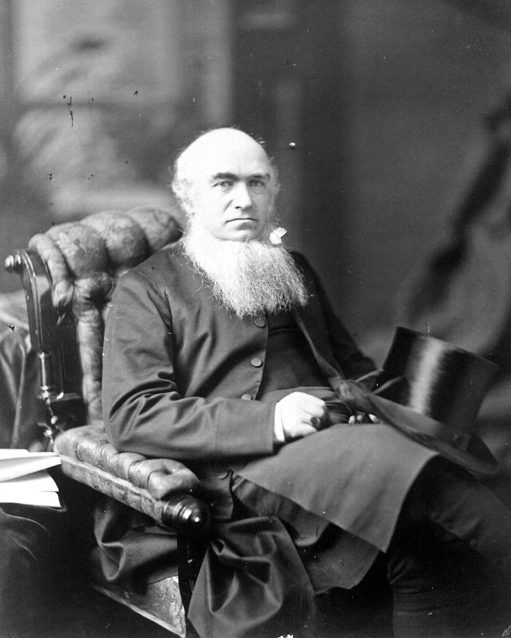
Hibbert Binney, fourth Bishop of Nova Scotia, d. 1887

== See also ==
- List of oldest buildings and structures in Halifax, Nova Scotia
- List of National Historic Sites of Canada in Nova Scotia
