= Khyber Arts Society =

Khyber Arts Society is a not-for profit charitable organization that operates the Khyber Centre for the Arts, an artist-run centre in Halifax, Nova Scotia. The name “Khyber” commemorates the café owned and operated by the Nasr family in the old "The Khyber Building" at 1588 Barrington St., named for the Khyber Pass, a mountain pass that connects Afghanistan and Pakistan.

== Mandate ==
The Khyber's mandate is to present contemporary visual art, which exists in a wide variety of disciplines. We challenge traditional gallery conventions, encourage public understanding and appreciation of contemporary art through responsive and relevant programming. The Khyber works to prioritize, centre and promote the presentation of work by emerging local, national and/or international artists. Additionally, we aim to recognize and disrupt systemic forms of oppression, which include but are not limited to: racism, white supremacy, sexism, heterosexism, cissexism/transmisogyny, tokenism, ableism, ageism, sizeism, sexualized and all acts of violence and harassment. This will be implemented through anti-oppressive policy and practices through Khyber programming, operating and in relation to staff, Board members and artists presented. The Khyber provides a physical and flexible space for the support of socially-engaged Primary and Membership programming, as well as cultivating relationships with a variety of arts communities that engage in artistic research, experimentation, production, education and distribution.

== History ==
In 1994, The Khyber Building was operated as an arts facility by a group of artists previously known as the No Money Down Cultural Society. They led a widespread and collaborative community campaign to ensure continued public access to "The Khyber Building" which was at risk of closer.

In March 1995, the Khyber Arts Society was established to operate The Khyber Centre for the Arts, a Canadian artist-run centre.

In 1997, the Society signed a lease to occupy the Khyber Building.

In 1998, the Khyber Club opened as a meeting place for visual artists and as an important venue for Halifax's emerging music scene including acts by now well established Canadian recording artists Joel Plaskett, Jenn Grant, Old Man Luedecke and Buck 65.

Sobey Art Award nominee, Emily Vey Duke, was artistic director for the Society in 2004.

The Khyber Arts Society based its contemporary art programming out of "The Khyber Building" until 2014, when the city required all tenants to leave.

In April 2014, the organization was temporarily relocated to 5521 Cornwallis St.

In November 2015, the organization moved to 1880 Hollis St. where it currently operates The Khyber Centre for the Arts and has continued to serve many artists and communities, offering an increasingly rigorous public program.

== Charitable Status ==
The Khyber Arts Society is a registered Canadian charitable organization.
