= Halifax Academy building =

Historic building in Halifax, Nova Scotia

Coordinates: 44.645812°N 63.576057°W

Alliance Atlantis Academy
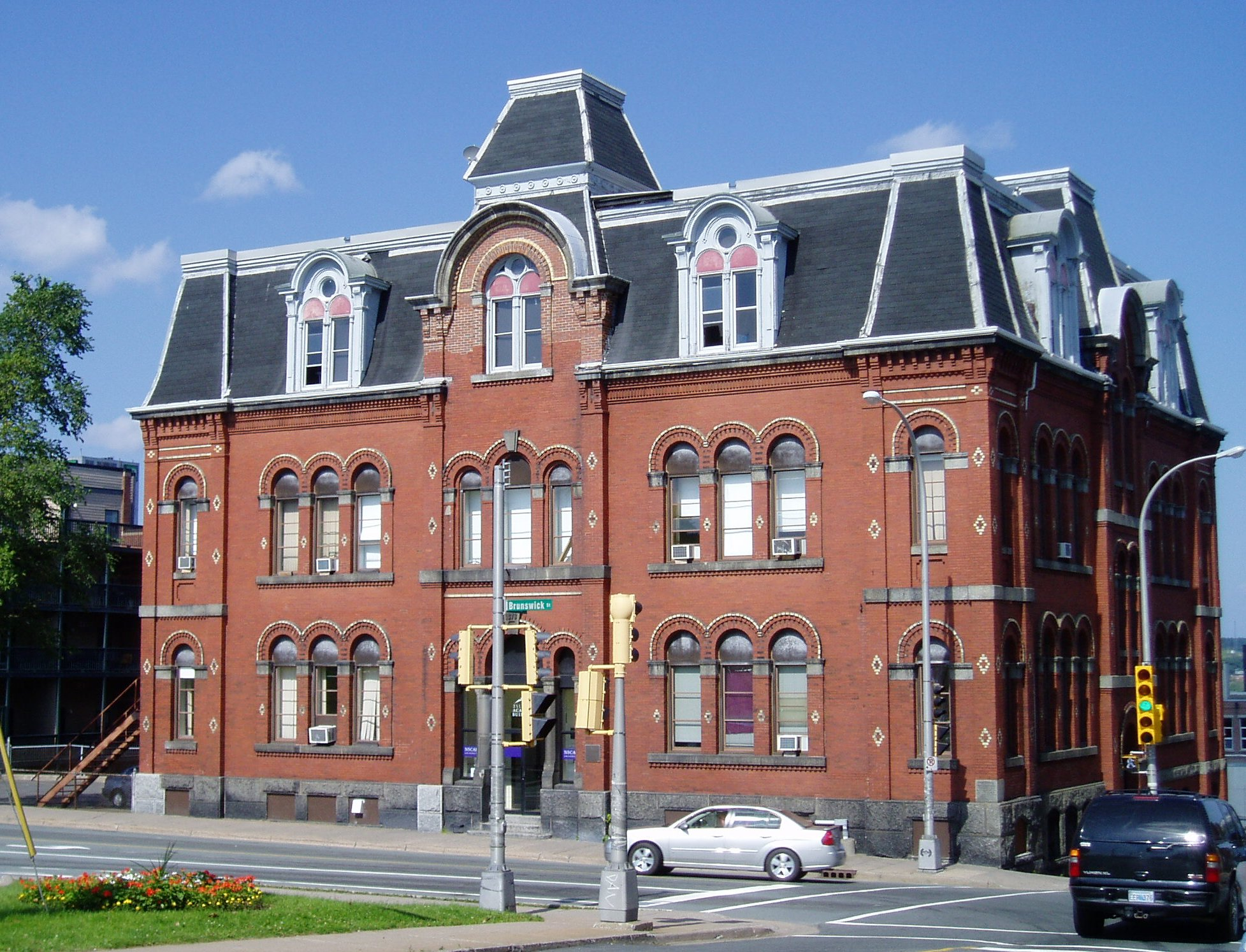

Location
- 1649 Brunswick Street, Halifax, NS

Information
- Established: 1878; 148 years ago

Halifax Academy building, or Alliance Atlantis Academy, is a Victorian era building located in downtown Halifax, Nova Scotia. It is a registered heritage property.

== Heritage value ==
It was built in 1877 for use as a high school, the Halifax Academy. In 1883 Dalhousie University rented two rooms in which to house the newly founded Dalhousie Law School.

It is a three-storey, red brick building built in the Second Empire style. It was designed by Henry Busch, a proponent of the style, and prominent Halifax architect. Andrew Cobb designed an extension in 1917.

== Modern day ==
In 2003 Alliance Atlantis donated the building to NSCAD University who have used it for their film program since 2004.
