= Khyber (Hunza) =

Village in Gilgit-Baltistan, Pakistan

Coordinates: 36°34′37″N 74°47′34″E

Khaibar (Khaiber Khay-bar Khyber) is a village in the upper Hunza Valley of Gilgit–Baltistan in Pakistan. It is situated between Kirilgoz Peak (4,797 metres (15,738 ft)) and Shanoz Peak(4,172 metres (13,688 ft)), below the Shaujerab Glacier, and just to the west of the Hunza River. Administratively the village governs an area of 330 square kilometres (82,000 acres).

Both Wakhi and Burushaski speakers live in the village. The village is mostly famous for its own law made by the people and the follow it by every mean. different families resides in the valley and two members from each families are the part of the governing bodies that governs the law and these members are responsible to regulate the law within the village, and is also famous for hunting of the mountain ibex. the hunting was banned for the local people since 1991, which results in the increasing in the population of this animal and according to the people of the area this population exceeds more than five thousand. Each winter foreigners used to visit this valley for trophy hunting of the mountain ibex and pay for it, and the money is being handed over to an organization namely SKIDO(Shahi Khyber Imamabad Development Organization) which deals with the hunting in the village. this money is being used for the development work of the village like education, health care, infrastructure etc. while there is another organization SKIWO (Shahi Khyber Imamabad Welfare Organization), that works for the law regulation and welfare purposes. Both organization have their own cabinet members having chairman, presidents vice president, finance secretaries and members. The community is of the Shia Ismaili faith in Islam.
