= Khyber Rock =

- Location within Gauteng Location within South Africa
- Coordinates: 26.053°S 28.085°E
- Country: South Africa
- Province: Gauteng
- Municipality: City of Johannesburg
- Time zone: UTC+2 (SAST)
- Postal code (street): 2191
- PO box: 2157

Khyber Rock is a suburb of Johannesburg, South Africa. It is located in Region E of the City of Johannesburg Metropolitan Municipality.

== Background ==
One of Johannesburg's smallest and most exclusive northern suburbs with one main road, Lincoln Rd, running through it from east to west for about only 650m. Khyber Rock borders the more well known Woodmead and is geologically part of an extinct volcanic area. Known for its high levels of mineral and metal content in the surrounding rocks, this area is susceptible to lightning strikes during the frequent summer thunderstorm activity.

Johannesburg architect Carmel Back and husband Harry bought 8.5 ha of wooded hillside called Kyhber Rock around 1957. When overwhelmed by demand by the sale of cottage on their property, they decided to apply for subdivision rights and turn their land into a suburb. The Mediterranean style architecture was the style used by her designs for the first houses, nestled amongst the hills rocks, with winding brick roads. Subsequent house had to seek her design approval.
