= Hibbert Binney =

Canadian Church of England bishop (1819–87)

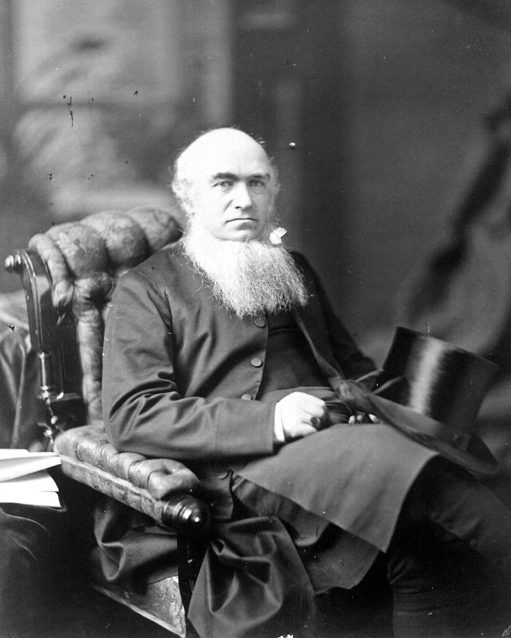

Bishop of Nova Scotia
- In office 1851–1887
- Preceded by: John Inglis
- Succeeded by: Frederick Courtney

Personal details
- Born: 12 August 1819 Sydney, Nova Scotia
- Died: 30 April 1887 (aged 67) New York City, New York

Hibbert Binney (12 August 1819 – 30 April 1887) was a Canadian Church of England bishop. He was the fourth Bishop of Nova Scotia from 1851 to 1887.

Born in Sydney, Nova Scotia, the grandson of Hibbert Newton Binney and the son of the Reverend Hibbert Binney and Henrietta Amelia Stout. Hibbert Binney Sr. was the rector of St George's Church in Sydney. In 1823, Binney Sr. returned to England with his family to become rector of Newbury, Berkshire. From 1833, he was the minister of Trinity Chapel, Knightsbridge, London. The family lived at Mound House, 11 Holland Park Avenue, north Kensington.

Binney Jr. was educated at King's College London, and received a Bachelor of Arts degree from Worcester College, Oxford in 1842. He was ordained deacon by the Bishop of Oxford Richard Bagot in 1842 and was appointed a fellow of Worcester College. In 1844, he received his Master of Arts and was appointed tutor in 1846. In 1848, he became bursar of Worcester College.

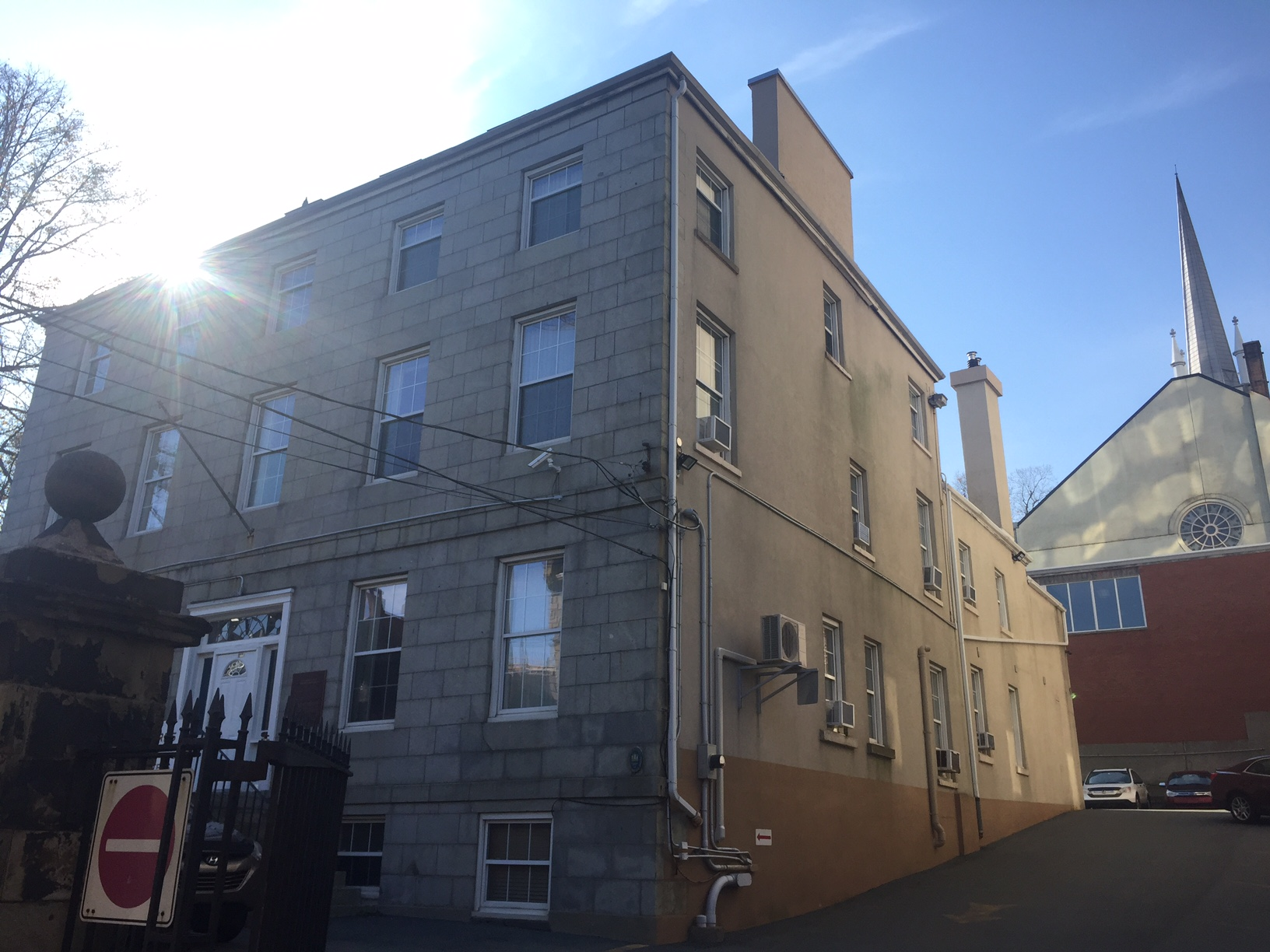
Black-Binney House, Halifax, Nova Scotia

In 1851, Binney was named Bishop of Nova Scotia and was consecrated in London by Archbishop John Bird Sumner of Canterbury and assisted by Bishops Blomfield of London, Wilberforce of Oxford, and Gilbert of Chichester.

He was married to Mary Bliss (1829–1903), the daughter of William Blowers Bliss and Sarah Ann Anderson. Binney lived for years with Rosina in what is now known as the Black-Binney House, which is now a national historic site.

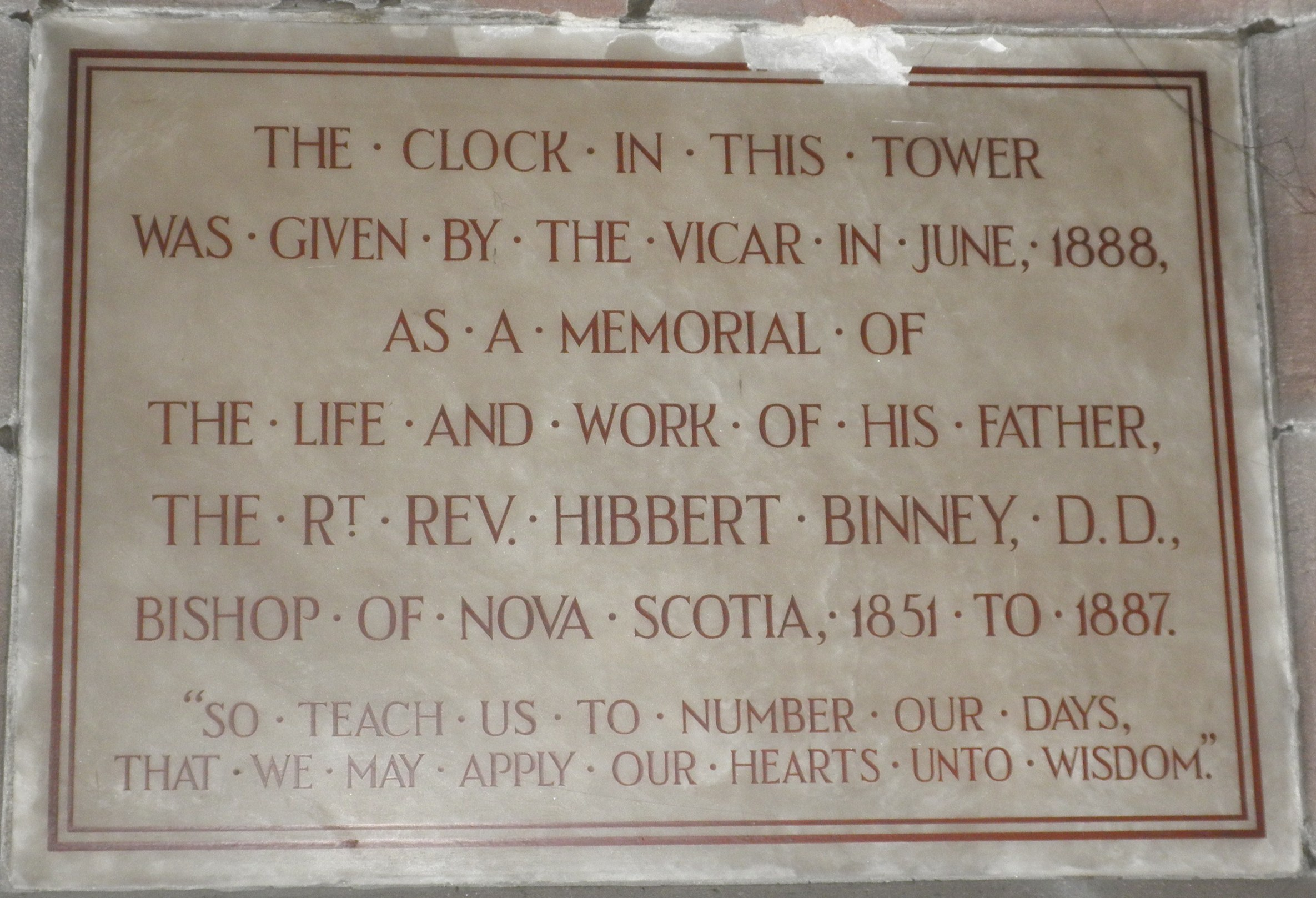
Hibbert Binney memorial, St Helen Witton Church, Northwich, Witton, Northwich, Cheshire
