= Henry Busch (architect) =

Canadian architect (1826–1902)

- Born: Henry Frederick Busch; January 6, 1826; Hamburg, Germany
- Died: January 26, 1902 (aged 76); Halifax, Nova Scotia, Canada
- Occupation: Architect

Henry Frederick Busch (January 6, 1826 – January 26, 1902) was a prominent architect in Halifax, Nova Scotia.

He was born on January 6, 1826 in Hamburg, Germany, and was baptized Heinrich Friedrich. He worked as a builder and designer, and spent some years in Austria and Russian Poland. He moved to the United States in 1847, spending some time in Kentucky, then moving north due to his health, living in Chester, Nova Scotia where he had an uncle. He continued designing and building wooden houses, and met his wife in nearby Hubbards. They married on 27 December 1860 and moved to Halifax.

On arrival in Halifax he joined architect Henry Elliot as a draftsman, and by April 1862 they were partners. Between 1857 and 1861 three fires had created the need to rebuild whole blocks in the business district of Halifax, and new regulations demanded that construction in the city centre use fire-proof materials rather than timber. The partners were responsible for the design of several blocks of business buildings in brick, stone, fire-stone, and granite. In 1863 they got the contract to design the new Halifax County jail. Other joint projects included a house for William Cunard (1864), the Halifax Protestant Industrial School (1871) and a Presbyterian church on Tobin Street (1871).

From the time of its construction in 1872 until the early 1890s, Busch lived in the right-side of the townhouse at 2575 - 2581 Creighton Street, Halifax, now a municipally registered heritage property. Between 1868 and 1875 he and his wife were involved in several real-estate transactions. In 1874 Busch became a British citizen, and in 1877 he began practising on his own. His works include the Halifax Academy building, the provincial Normal School at Truro, the Provincial and City Hospital in Halifax, the Halifax Poor’s Asylum (1886), the bandstand in the Halifax Public Gardens (1887), Convent of the Sacred Heart Chapel, Salvation Army Citadel (1895), and Halifax Visiting Dispensary.

Busch retired in 1899 and died in Halifax on January 26, 1902.
