= Halifax Public Gardens =

Public park in Halifax, Canada

Coordinates: 44°38′34″N 63°34′56″W

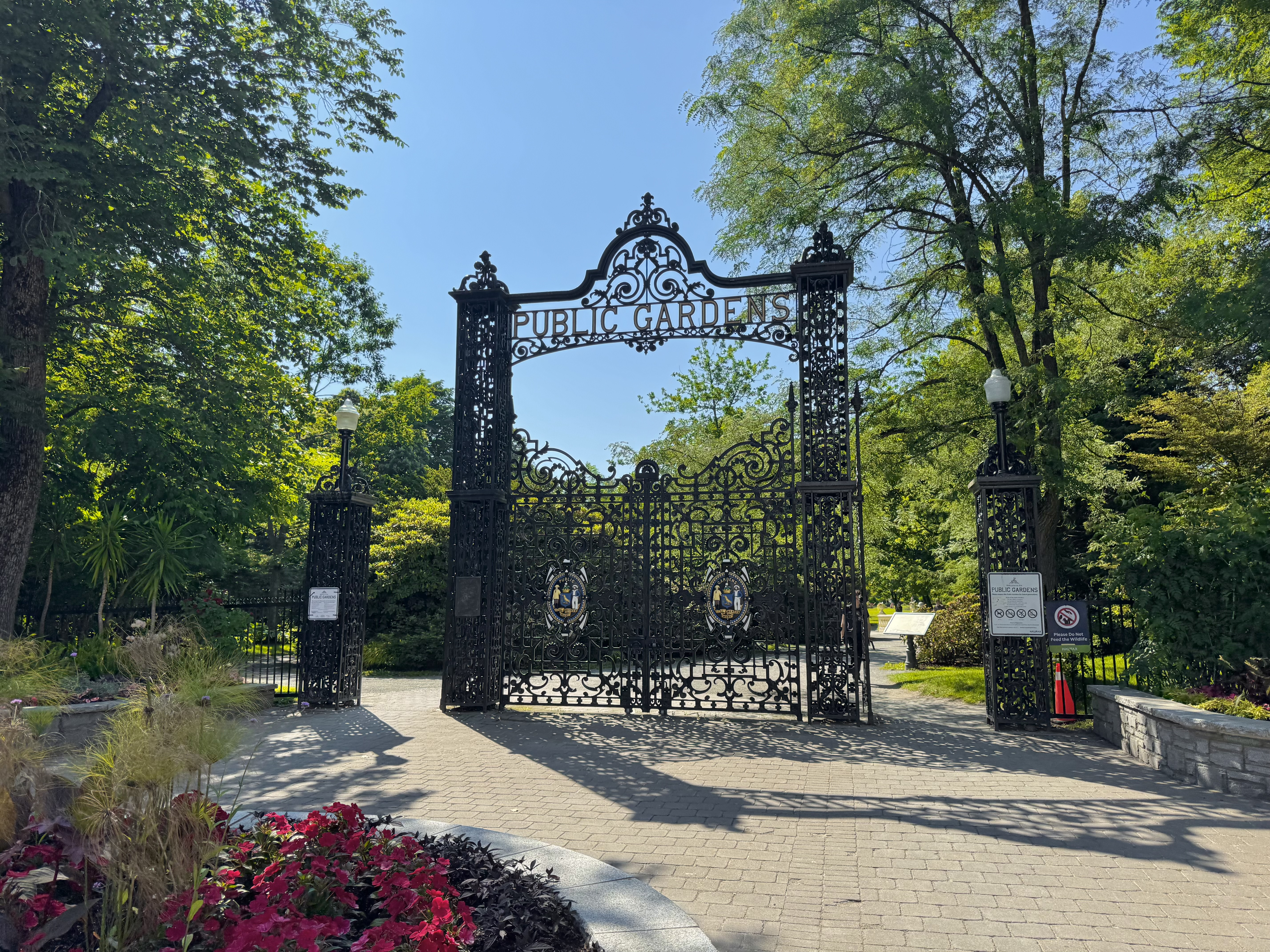
- Wrought-iron gates erected to honour the Halifax Provisional Battalion (1907)
- Interactive map of Halifax Public Gardens
- Type: City park
- Location: Halifax, Nova Scotia
- Area: 16 acres (6.5 ha)
- Created: 1867
- Operator: Halifax Regional Municipality
- Status: Open all year
- Public transit: Halifax Transit

National Historic Site of Canada
- Official name: Halifax Public Gardens National Historic Site of Canada
- Designated: 1984

Nova Scotia Heritage Property Act
- Type: Municipally Registered Property
- Designated: 1991

The Halifax Public Gardens are Victorian-era public gardens formally established in 1867, the year of Canadian Confederation. The gardens are located in Halifax, Nova Scotia, on the Halifax Peninsula near the popular shopping district of Spring Garden Road and opposite Victoria Park. The gardens were designated a National Historic Site of Canada in 1984.

== Gardens ==
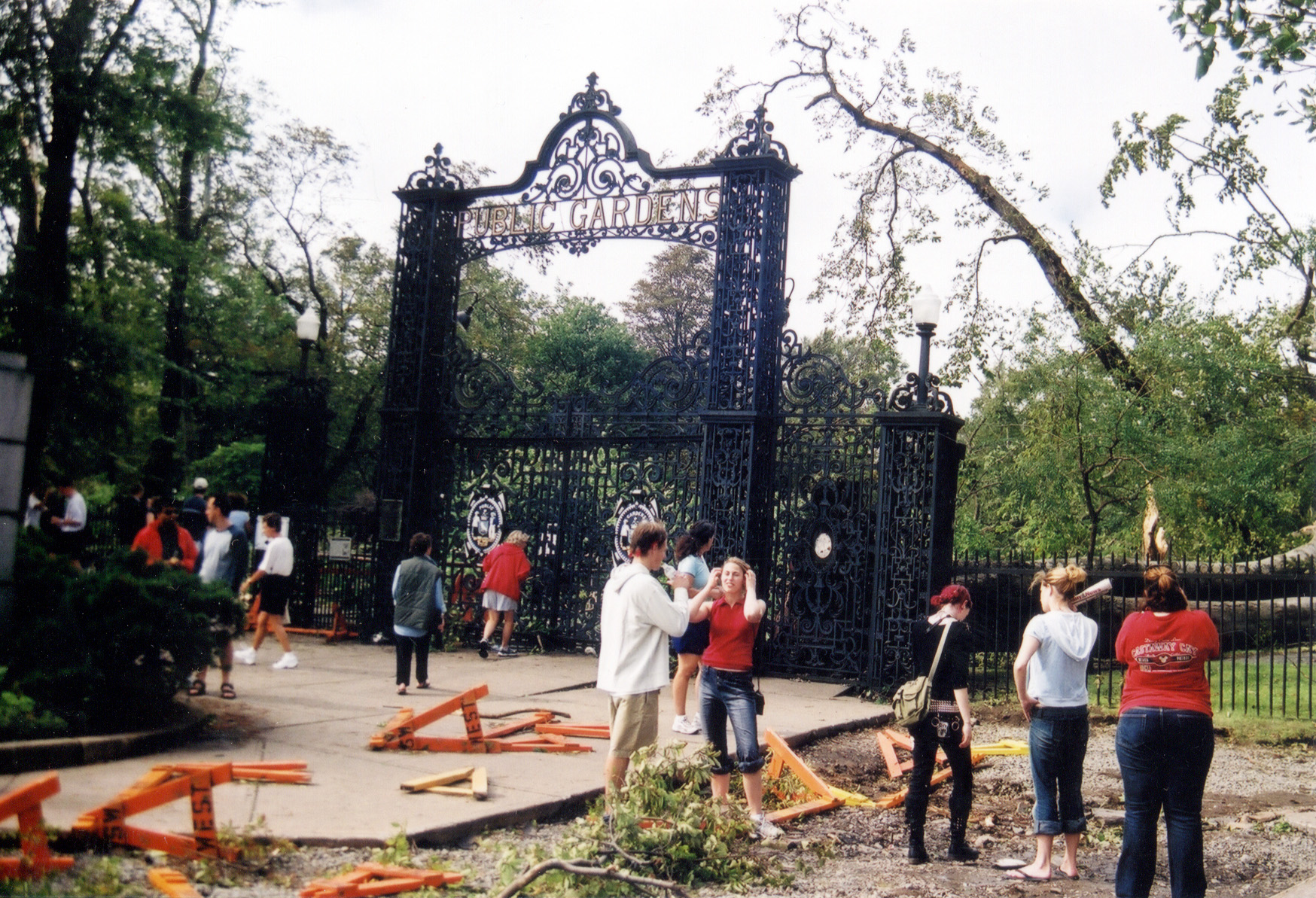
Park Entrance after Hurricane Juan, September 29, 2003

The Public Gardens encompass 16 acres and are bounded by Spring Garden Road, South Park Street, Summer Street and Sackville Street. They are open, conditions permitting, year-round. The landscaping style is Victorian formal and provides a popular setting for wedding and prom photos. In addition to statues and extensive flower beds, there are three fountains, two stone bridges, three ponds (one large and two small), and a small concession building (located in the original Horticultural Hall). The gardens also feature a bandstand that is used for free public concerts on Sunday afternoons during the summer. There are celebrations in the gardens every year on Canada Day (July 1) and Natal Day (the first Monday in August).

In the past, many people enjoyed feeding the ducks who make the gardens their home, although it is now prohibited.

== History ==
The Halifax Public Gardens was established in 1874 by the amalgamation of two older gardens, the Nova Scotia Horticultural Society Garden (laid out in 1837) and an adjacent public park (opened in 1866). In 1872, Richard Power was hired as the park's superintendent. He introduced an axially symmetrical plan which governs the overall design of the site. Over the years, he oversaw the introduction of the bandstand (designed by architect Henry Busch), fountains, statues, and wrought iron gates as well as establishing the bedding out of annuals in highly designed carpet beds, redesigned Griffin's Pond and introduced water fowl.

The gardens were designated a National Historic Site in 1984, and a Municipally Registered Property under the Heritage Property Act in 1991.

The Public Gardens were badly damaged by Hurricane Juan in 2003; many trees were destroyed. The gardens reopened on Canada Day, 2004 after a restoration aided in part by $1 million which was raised during a radio telethon. Fortunately, a number of old trees survived the hurricane, including an American elm that dates back to the 1860s.

Sometime during the night of July 25 and 26, 2022, an unknown person or group used a hatchet or axe to strategically hack away bark from each of approximately 30 historic trees, a technique called girdling that eventually kills the tree; gardens staff stated the vandals "knew exactly what they were doing". The vandalised trees range in age from 50 to 200 years. As of 2024, most of the trees were still alive and nighttime security has been increased, but it is still unknown who the vandal was. On the night of September 15, 2022, the exterior of an historic building in the gardens was damaged in an apparent arson.

== Monuments and commemorations ==
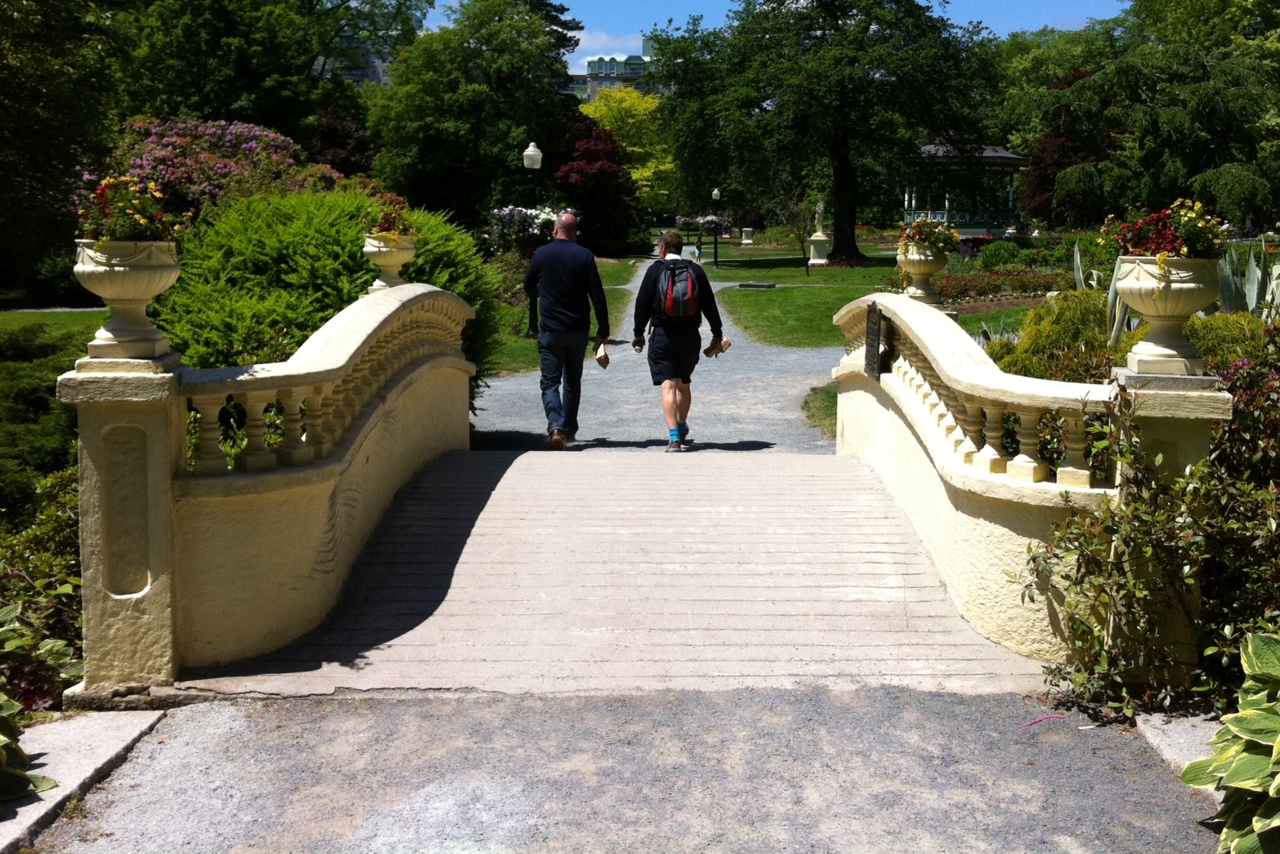
Francis Fitzgerald Bridge over Freshwater Brook

There are various plaques throughout the Gardens commemorating historic military figures and operations during the Victorian era and early twentieth century. There is a commemorative plaque for the Halifax Provisional Battalion (1785) which served in the North-West Rebellion. The wrought-iron gates were erected as a tribute to the Halifax Provisional Battalion. In 1898 a plaque was created for Nova Scotian Clonard Keating of the Prince of Wales's Leinster Regiment who died in Nigeria prior to the Second Boer War. There is also a statue of a soldier from the Canadian Mounted Rifles (renamed the Royal Canadian Dragoons) who fought in the Second Boer War by renowned sculptor Hamilton MacCarthy (who also created South African War Memorial (Halifax) and the sculpture to Harold Lothrop Borden in Canning, Nova Scotia). A tree was also planted in memory of the first Canadian casualty of the Boer War, Charles Carroll Wood. There is also a bridge that commemorates Nova Scotian Francis Joseph Fitzgerald of the Royal North-West Mounted Police who died in the "Lost Patrol".

There are two plaques to prominent members of the Temperance movement of the 1930s. One such plaque is for a flowerbed dedicated to renowned suffragist Frances Willard by the local Woman's Christian Temperance Union on the centennial of her birth (1939). Willard was instrumental in passing the 18th and 19th Amendments to the U.S. Constitution. The 19th Amendment permitted women to vote in the U.S., and the 18th forbade the use of alcoholic beverage. Willard was the president of the World's Woman's Christian Temperance Union for 19 years (1879–1897). Another plaque is to mark a tree than was planted for renowned temperance crusader John Bartholomew Gough by the Sons of Temperance and the Rosebud Band of Hope, the latter group being the children's wing of the Sons of Temperance Society (1936). Gough wrote about visiting Halifax:

I continued there for more than a week, delivering nine lectures. I had an opportunity of addressing the famous 42nd Regiment of Foot, then stationed at Halifax. An English paper stated, three years after, that "many of the men were all the better for it."

In 1887 (the same year that the Bandstand was built), the estate of chief justice Sir William Young, donated three statues from Roman mythology and six urns from his own garden, to the Halifax Public Gardens. Ceres, the Roman goddess representing agriculture and fertility; Flora the goddess of flowers and spring, and Diana the goddess of the woodland and wild animals, all reside along the Petit Allée. The six urns were placed around the Bandstand within the ‘floating beds’. Griffin Pond, on which floats a model of the Titanic, is named after a young Irishman Lawrence Griffin. Griffin was charged with murder and the legal proceedings took seven months. Under the authority of the Lt. Governor James Kempt, Griffin was wrongfully convicted and hanged for murder on October 24, 1821, on the east side of the pond.

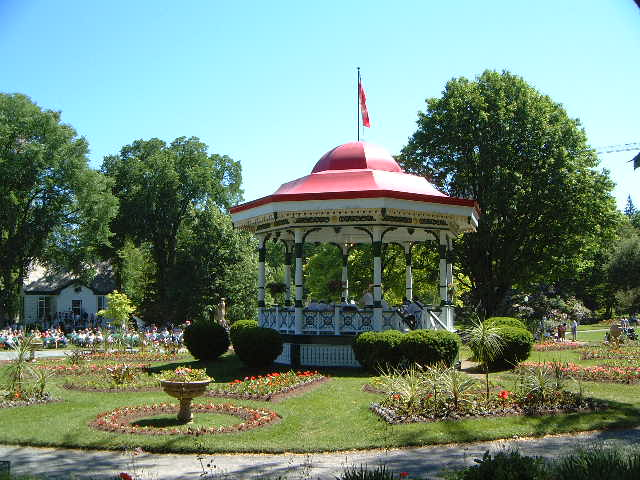
The Bandstand

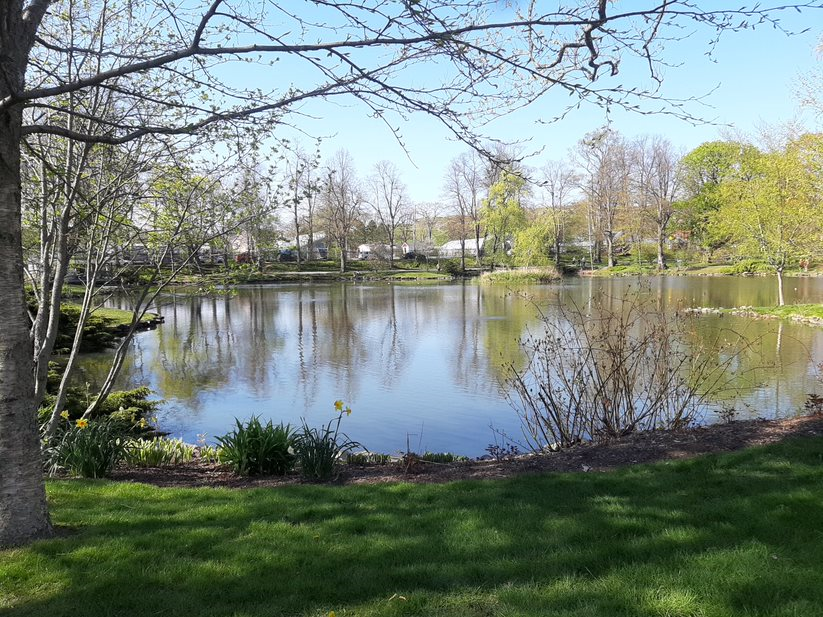
Griffin Pond in May 2021

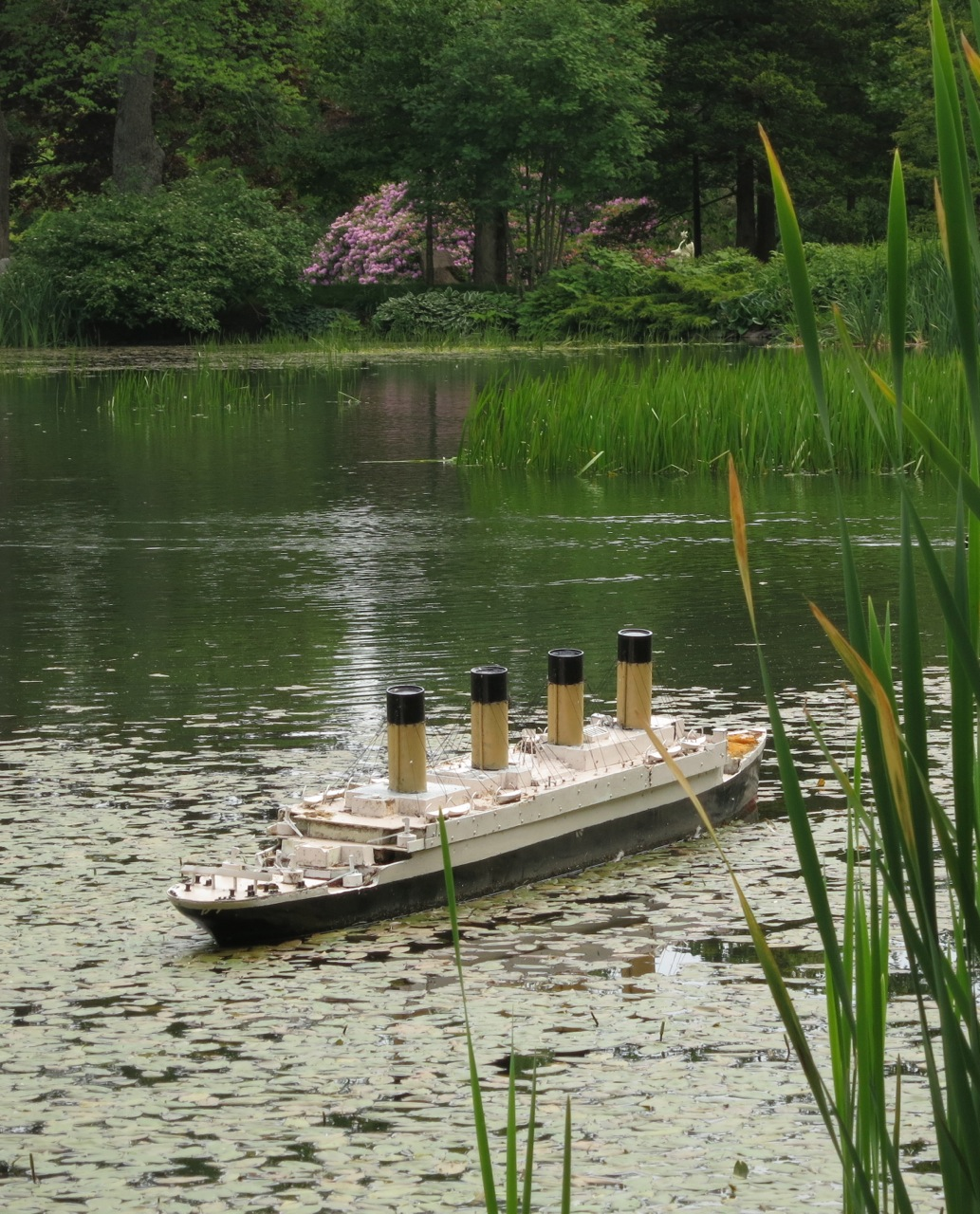
Griffin Pond, named for wrongfully hanged Irishman, Lawrence Griffin.

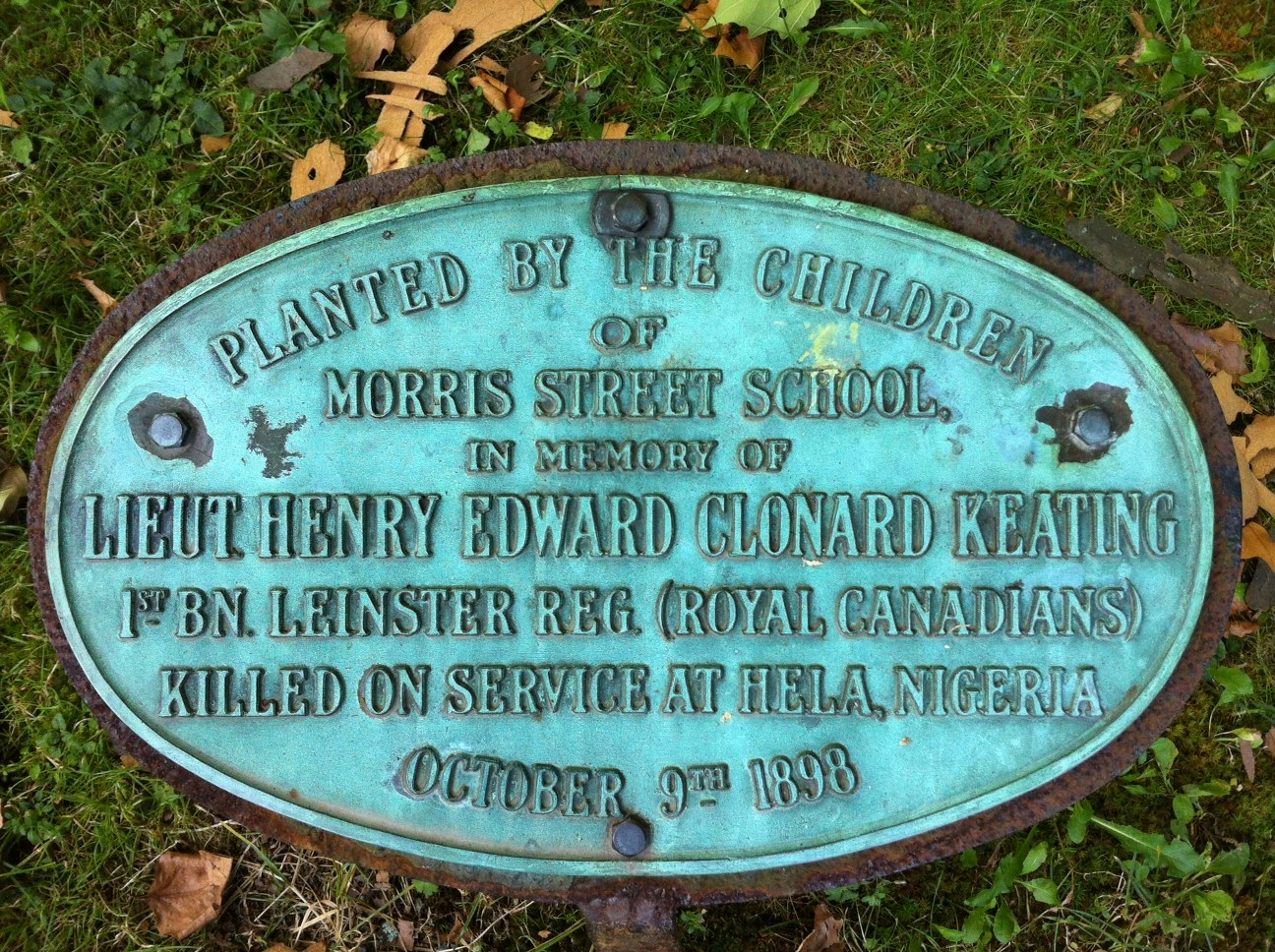
Clonard Keating Plaque (1898)

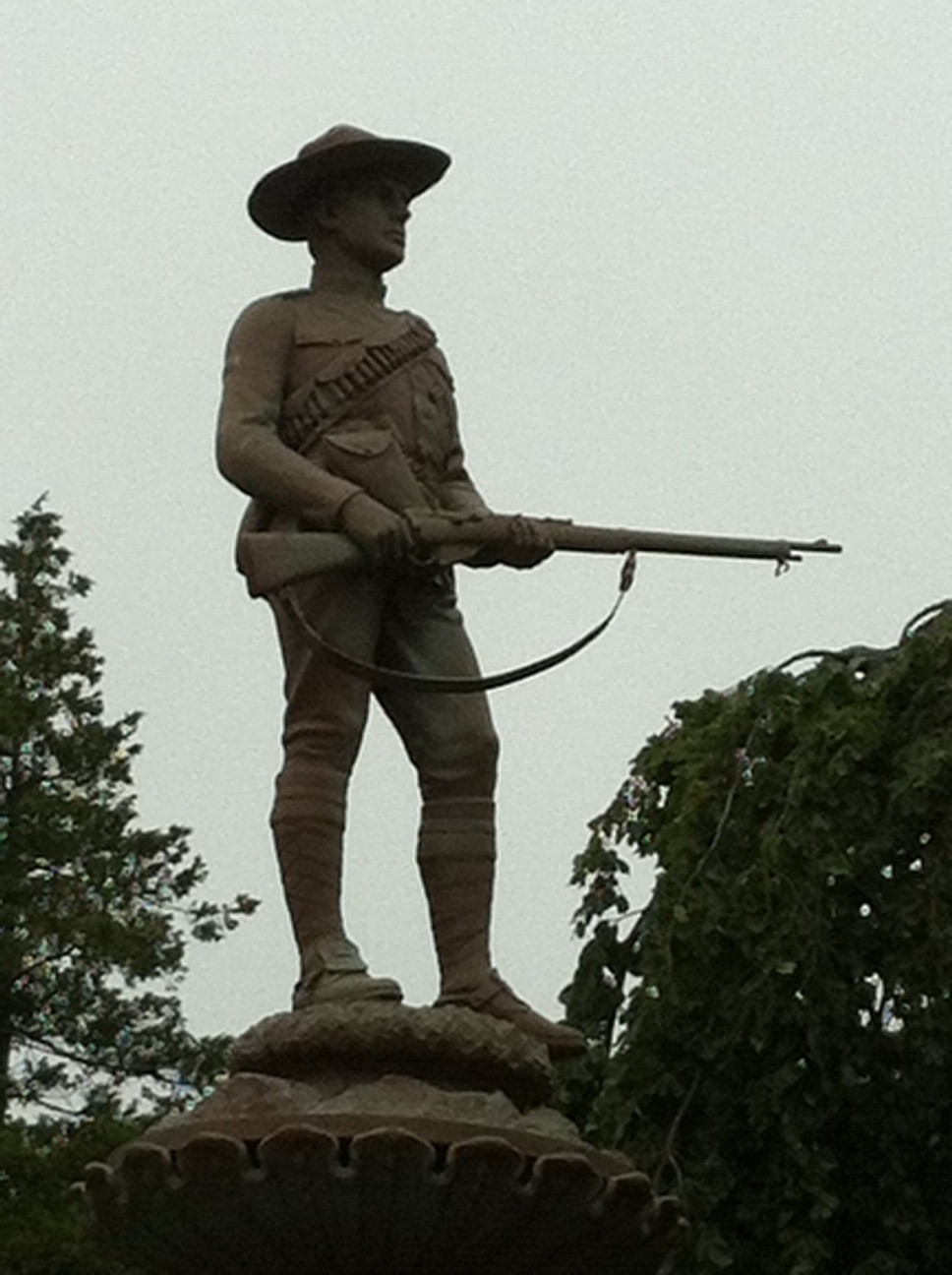
Royal Canadian Dragoons, Boer War Sculpture by Hamilton MacCarthy (1903)

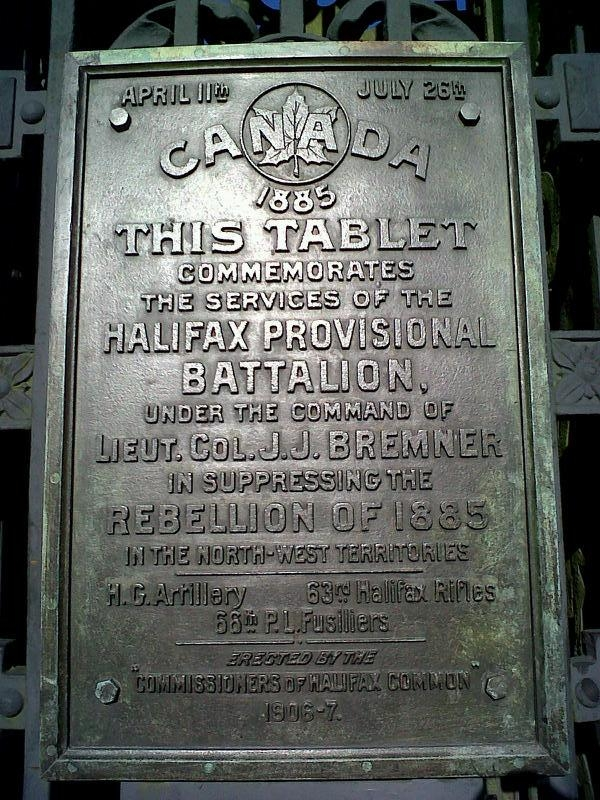
Halifax Provisional Battalion Plaque, Main Gate (1907)

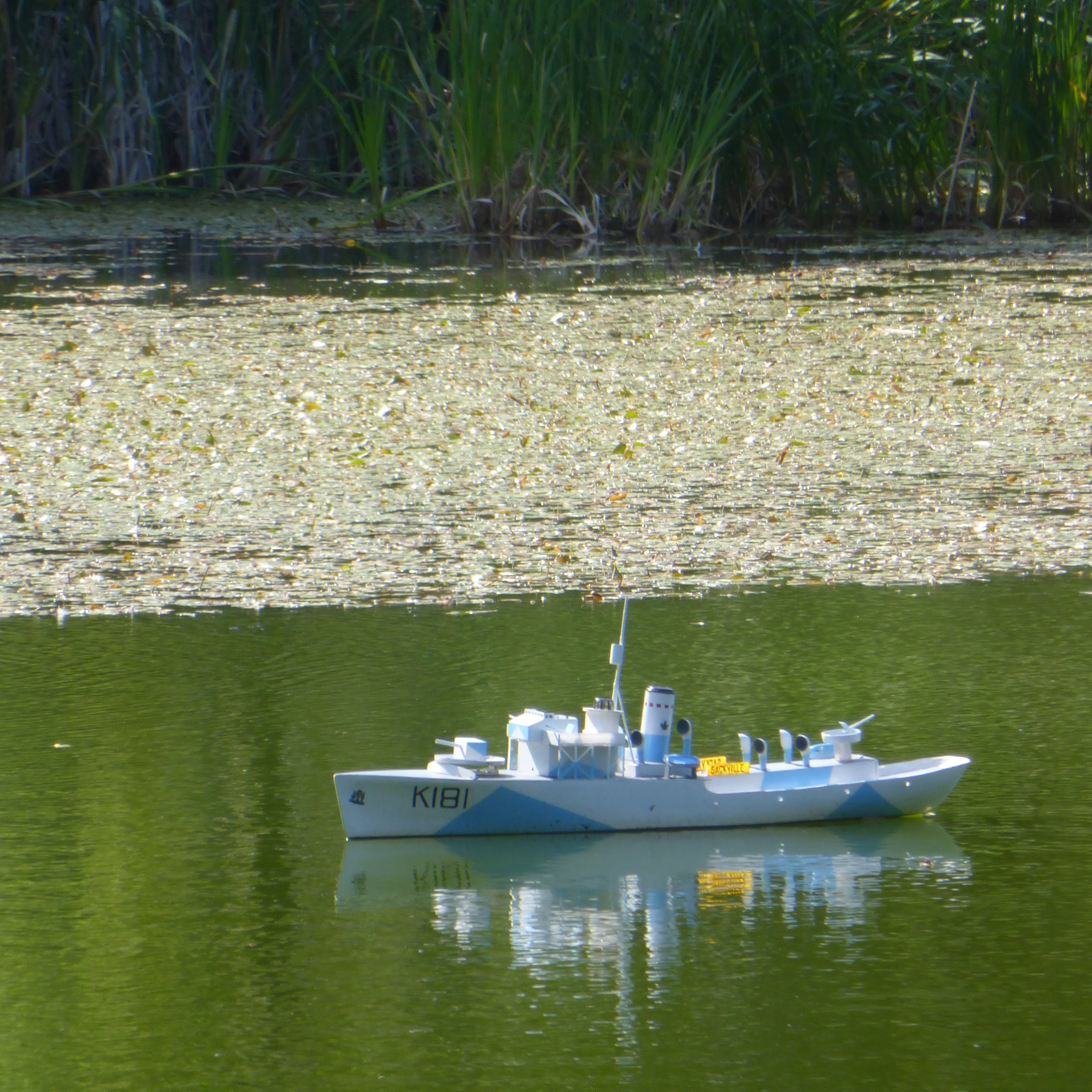
Model of HMCS Sackville in Griffin Pond

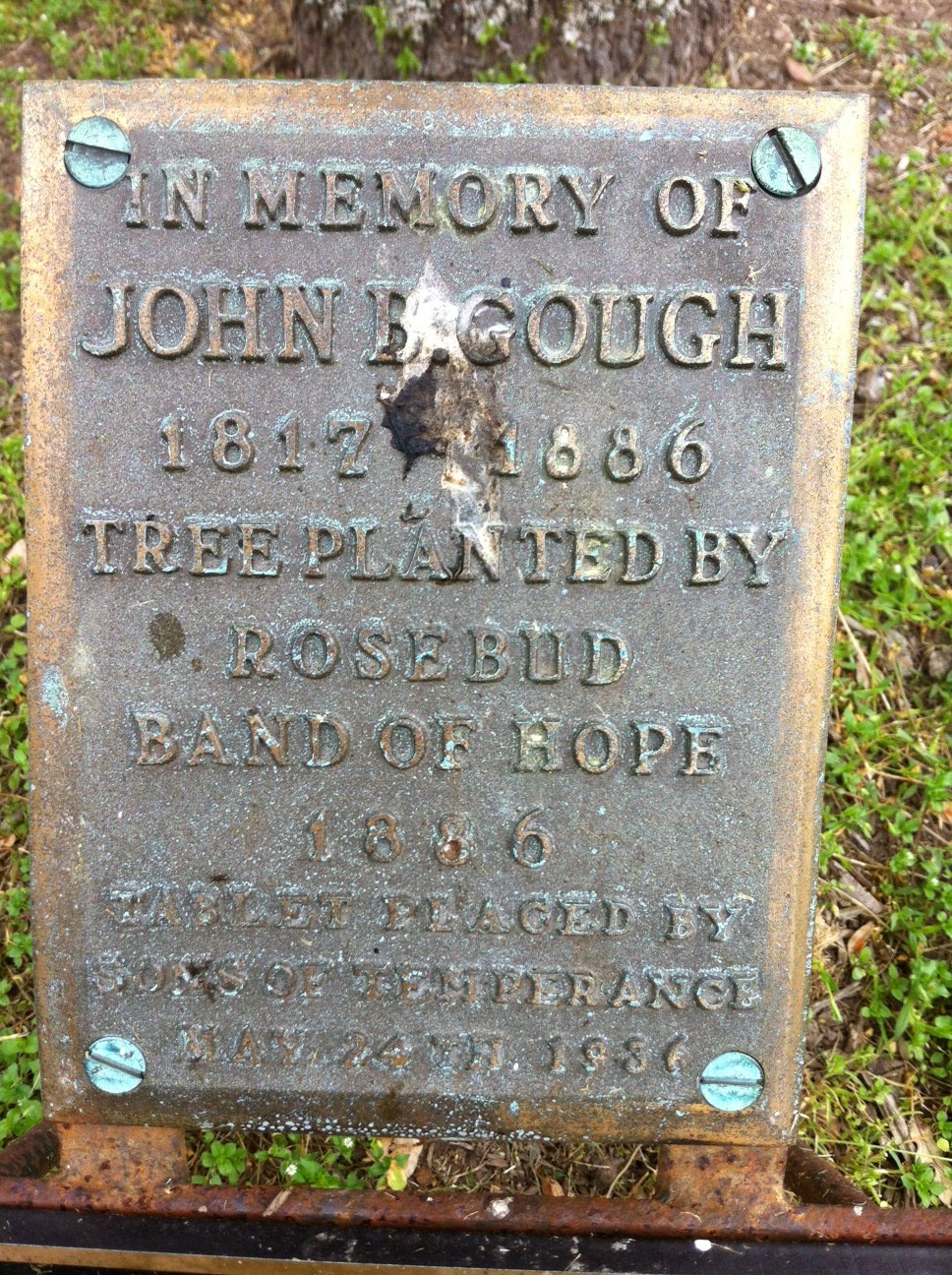
John Bartholomew Gough, Sons of Temperance (1936)

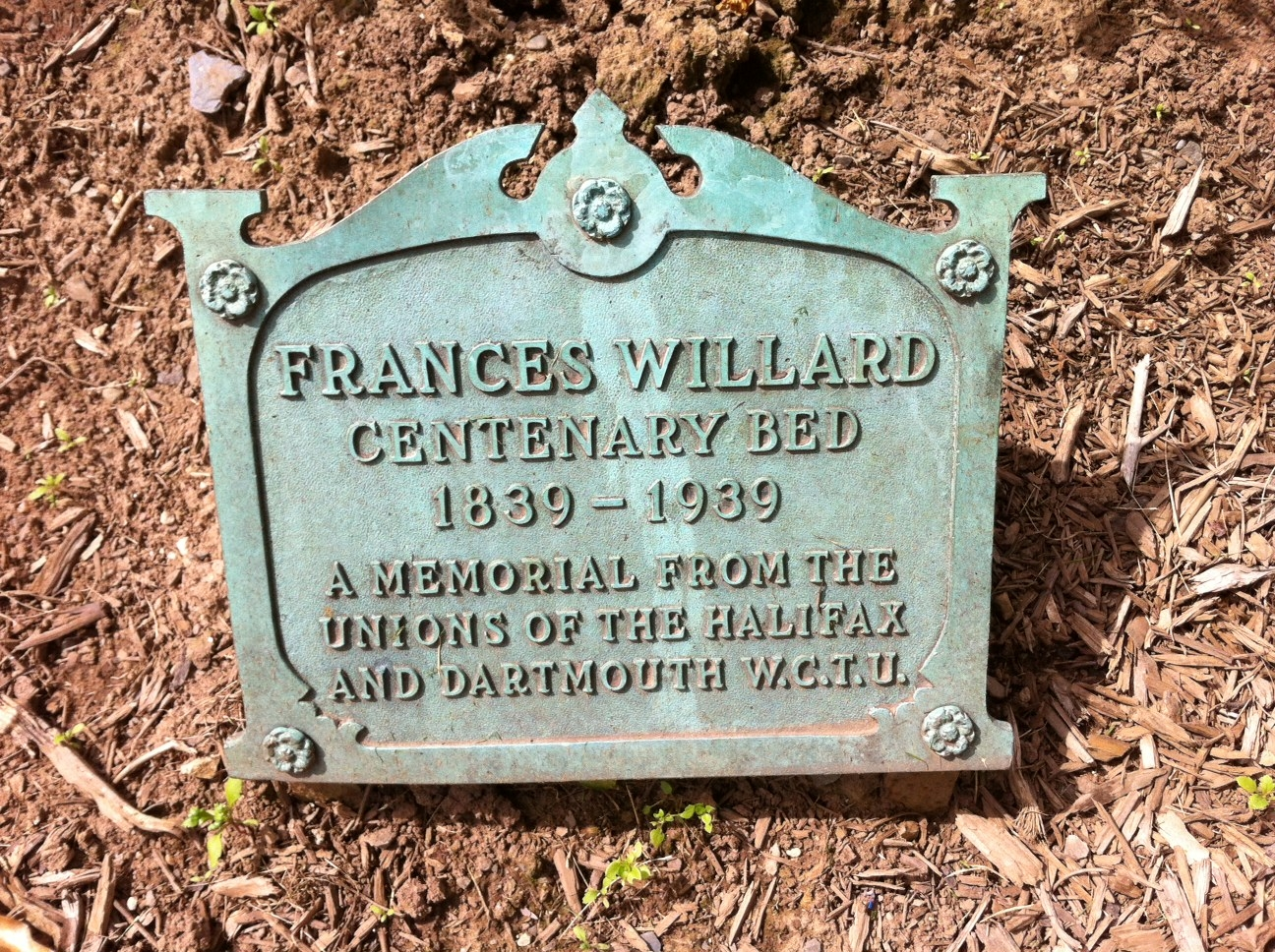
Frances Willard by the local Woman's Christian Temperance Union (1939)
