= Military history of the Acadians =

The military history of the Acadians consisted primarily of militias made up of Acadian settlers who participated in wars against the English (the British after 1707) in coordination with the Wabanaki Confederacy (particularly the Mi'kmaw militias) and French royal forces. (Note: Many of the Acadians and Mi'kmaw people were metis. For example, when Shirley put a bounty on the Mi'kmaw people during King George's War, the Acadians appealed in anxiety to Mascarene because of the "great number of Mulattoes amongst them". For information on Metis Acadians see: • Parmenter, Jon; Robison, Mark Power (April 2007). "The Perils and Possibilities of Wartime Neutrality on the Edges of Empire: Iroquois and Acadians between the French and British in North America, 1744–1760". Diplomatic History. 31 (2): 182. doi:10.1111/j.1467-7709.2007.00611.x. • Faragher (2005), pp. 35–48, 146–67, 179–81, 203, 271–77 • Paul, Daniel N. (1993). We Were Not the Savages: A Micmac Perspective on the Collision of European and Aboriginal Civilizations. Nimbus. pp. 38–67, 86, 97–104. ISBN 978-1-55109-056-6. • Plank (2001), pp. 23–39, 70–98, 111–14, 122–38 • Robison, Mark Power (2000). Maritime frontiers: The evolution of empire in Nova Scotia, 1713–1758 (Ph.D.). University of Colorado at Boulder. pp. 53–84. • Wicken, Bill (Autumn 1995). "26 Augusts 1726: A case study in Mi'kmaq-New England Relationships in the Early 18th Century". Acadiensis. XXIII (1): 20–21. JSTOR 30303468. • Wicken, William C. (1998). "Re-examining Mi'kmaq-Acadian Relations, 1635–1755". In Sylvie Dépatie; et al. (eds.). Vingt Ans Apres: Habitants et Marchands [Twenty Years Later]. McGill-Queen's University Press. pp. 93–109. ISBN 9780773567023.) A number of Acadians provided military intelligence, sanctuary, and logistical support to the various resistance movements against British rule in Acadia, while other Acadians remained neutral in the contest between the Franco–Wabanaki Confederacy forces and the British. The Acadian militias managed to maintain an effective resistance movement for more than 75 years and through six wars before their eventual demise. According to Acadian historian Maurice Basque, the story of Evangeline continues to influence historic accounts of the expulsion, emphasising Acadians who remained neutral and de-emphasising those who joined resistance movements. While Acadian militias were briefly active during the American Revolutionary War, the militias were dormant throughout the nineteenth century. After confederation, Acadians eventually joined the Canadian War efforts in World War I and World War II. The most well-known colonial leaders of these militias were Joseph Broussard and Joseph-Nicolas Gautier.

== Contest for supremacy in North America ==
=== King William's War (1688–1697) ===
The first war to influence the Acadians is now known as King William's War, and began in 1688. Much of the local conflict was orchestrated by the Governor of Acadia and Baron de St Castin, who raided Protestant villages along the Acadia-New England border at the Kennebec River in present-day Maine. The crews of the French privateer Pierre Maisonnat dit Baptiste were primarily Acadian.

The Acadians resisted during the Raid on Chignecto (1696). Colonel Benjamin Church and four hundred men (50 to 150 of whom were Indians, likely Iroquois) arrived offshore of Beaubassin on September 20. When they came ashore, the Acadians and Mi’kmaq opened fire on them. Church lost a lieutenant and several of his men. They managed to get ashore and surprise the Acadians. Many fled while one confronted Church with papers showing they had signed an oath of allegiance in 1690 to the English King. Church was unconvinced, especially after he discovered the proclamation heralding the French success at Pemaquid posted on the church door.

On October 18 Church and his troops arrived opposite the capital of Acadia, in the siege of Fort Nashwaak (1696), landed three cannons and assembled earthworks on the south bank of the Nashwaak River. (Note: Near where the Fort Nashwaak Motel now stands.) Pierre Maisonnat dit Baptiste was there to defend the capital. (Note: For details on the siege see Murdoch (1865), pp. 228–231) Baptiste joined the Maliseet from Meductic for the duration of the siege. There was a fierce exchange of gun fire for two days, with the advantage going to the better sited French guns. The New Englanders were defeated, having suffered eight killed and seventeen wounded. The French lost one killed and two wounded.

Letters from an Acadian official censured and requested the removal of certain priests, called "do nothings", who took no part in the King William's War but attended strictly to their religious duties and were therefore suspected of favouring the British. After the siege of Pemaquid (1696), d'Iberville led a force of 124 Canadians, Acadians, Mi’kmaq and Abenaki in the Avalon Peninsula campaign. They destroyed almost every British settlement in Newfoundland, killed more than 100 British and captured many more. They deported almost 500 British colonists to Britain or France.

=== Queen Anne's War (1702–1713) ===
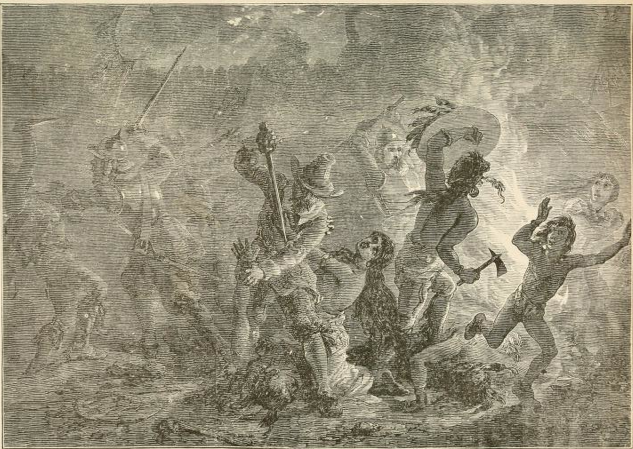
Raid on Grand Pre (1704)

During Queen Anne's War, the members of the Wabanaki Confederacy from Acadia raided Protestant settlements along the Acadia/ New England border in present-day Maine in the Northeast Coast campaign (1703) . Mi’kmaq and Acadians resisted the New England retaliatory Raid on Grand Pré, Piziquid and Chignecto in 1704. The raid was led by Benjamin Church who was fired on by the local militia, who had gathered in the woods along the banks. According to Church, on the first day of the raid, the Acadians and Mi’kmaq "fired smartly at our forces". Church had a small cannon on his boat, which he used to fire grape shot at the attackers on the shore, who withdrew, suffering one Mi’kmaw killed and several wounded. Church was unable to come ashore. Having withdrawn from the village, the next morning the Acadian and Mi’kmaw militia waited in the woods for Church and his men to arrive. At the break of day, the New Englanders again set off toward the village, under orders from Church to drive any resistance before them. The largest body of defenders fired on the raiders' right flank from behind trees and logs, but their fire was ineffective and they were driven off.

=== Conquest of Acadia and the Treaty of Utrecht ===
Acadians joined the French privateer Pierre Maisonnat dit Baptiste as crew members in his victories over British vessels. Acadians also fought alongside the Confederacy and French soldiers to protect the capital in the siege of Port Royal (1707) and the final Conquest of Acadia. Acadians and the Wabanaki Confederacy were also successful in the Battle of Bloody Creek (1711). The victory at Bloody Creek rallied the local resistance, and prompted many of the Acadians who were nominally under British protection to withdraw to the north. Soon thereafter a force of some 600 warriors, including Acadians, Abenaki, and Mi’kmaq, under the leadership of Gaulin and Saint-Castin, gathered and blockaded Fort Anne. The defending garrison was small, but the attackers had no artillery and were thus unable to make an impression on the fort, and the fort was still accessible by sea. Gaulin went to Plaisance in Newfoundland for supplies and equipment to advance the siege; Governor Philippe Pastour de Costebelle provided supplies, but the ship had the misfortune to encounter a major British fleet and was captured. That same expedition abandoned its goal of attacking Quebec when eight of its ships were lost on the shores of the Saint Lawrence River; Governor Vetch, who had accompanied the expedition as a leader of the provincial militia, returned to Annapolis Royal with 200 provincial militia, after which the besiegers withdrew.

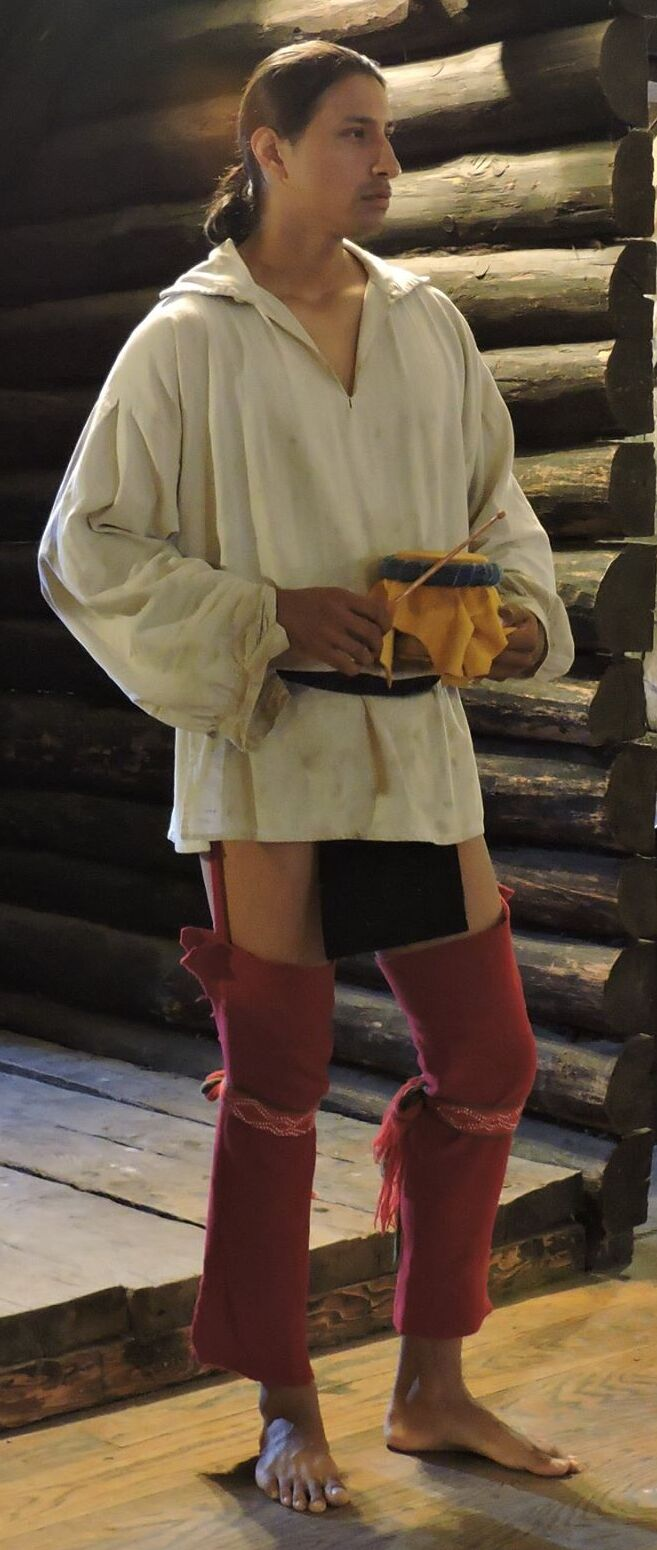
Recreation of part of the clothing issued to the Canadian Milice (Acadians) Delivered by The Governor General Frontenac from the 17th century

In the March 1713 Treaty of Utrecht, the French ceded "all Nova Scotia or Acadie, with its ancient boundaries, as also the city of Port Royal, now called Annapolis Royal, and all other things in those parts, which depend on the said lands and islands" to the British, but retained "the island called Cape Breton, as also all others, both in the mouth of the river of St. Lawrence, and in the gulph of the same name" with exception of the "island called Newfoundland with the adjacent islands," which "shall from this time forward belong of right wholly to Britain". For whatever reason, most Acadians refused to swear an oath of loyalty to Queen Anne or, later, King George. Thus were fifty years of nearly uninterrupted conflict to start, which were only to be punctuated by the expulsion of the Acadians.

=== Father Rale's War ===
==== Raid on Canso (1718) – The Squirrel Affair ====
In the lead up to Father Rale's War, shortly after Cyprian Southack established himself at Shelburne, Nova Scotia (1715), the Mi'kmaq raided the station and burned it to the ground. In response, on 17–24 September 1718, Southack led a raid on Canso and Chedabucto (present-day community of Guysborough) in what became known as the Squirrel Affair. Southack laid siege for three days to Fort St. Louis at Chedabucto, which was defended primarily by Acadians under Acadian Bernard LaSonde. There were approximately 300 Acadians in the area.

On board HMS Squirrel, Smart held a number of Frenchmen, including Bernard Marres dit La Sonde, Captain Darguibes, the French fishing admiral, and Sieur Dominice, a Basque captain.

On 23 September, Smart and Southack pillaged Canso. The pillaged goods were then loaded onto several French ships that had been captured in the harbor. The following day, 24 September, Southack released the Acadian prisoners, with the exception of Bernard Marres dit La Sonde, onto the Canso Islands without any provisions or clothing. Others fled to Isle Madame and Petit-de-Grat, Nova Scotia. He seized two French ships, and encouraged Governor of Nova Scotia Richard Philipps to build Fort William Augustus at Canso.

During Father Rale's War, the Maliseet raided numerous New England vessels on the Bay of Fundy while the Mi’kmaq, helped by Acadians, raided Canso, Nova Scotia (1723). Much of the conflict of this war happened along the Acadia-New England border. A priest, Father Sebastian Rale and Wabanaki Confederacy members from Acadia also participated in the 1723, 1724 campaigns along the border against the British, who had long threatened to remove the Acadians because they would not take an oath of loyalty. Even during Father Le Loutre's War some twenty years later, the British talked of deporting the Acadians who would not swear loyalty to Britain. On 28 December 1720, in London, someone in the House of Lords said: "It seems as though the French in Nova Scotia will never be good British subjects to her Majesty ... This is why we believe that they should be expulsed as soon as the necessary forces, which will be sent to Nova Scotia, are ready."

=== King George's War ===
==== Siege of Annapolis Royal (1744) ====
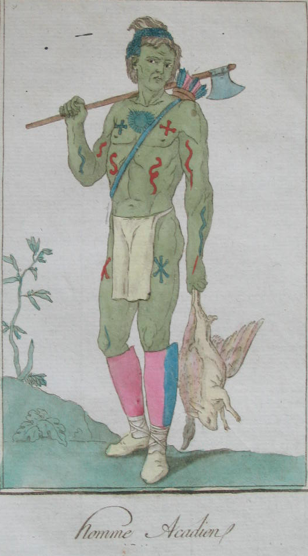
Mi'kmaq Man. (Note: The Nova Scotia Museum indicates that this is a Mi’kmaq man. "This Mi'kmaq man has light hair and European features; his accoutrements are also inaccurately depicted. The 1750 account of Swedish botanist Peter Kalm, or the eighteenth-century letters of the Abbé Pierre Antoine Simon Maillard, may be the artist's basis for this engraving; both mention Mi'kmaq men tattooed with crosses and suns. This engraving was published in an encyclopedia by J. Grasset St-Saveur, "ci-devant vice-consul de la Nation française en Hongrie." The complementary image—"Femme Acadienne" is also Mi’kmaq.) (Note: Morris, Charles. A Brief Survey of Nova Scotia. The Royal Artillery Regimental Library, Woolwich. Morris provides a description of the Acadians: "The people are tall and well proportioned, they delight much in wearing long hair, they are of dark complexion, in general, and somewhat of the mixture of Indians; but there are some of a light complexion. They retain the language and customs of their neighbours the French, with a mixed affectation of the native Indians, and imitate them in their haunting and wild tones in their merriment; they are naturally full cheer and merry, subtle, speak and promise fair,...")

During King George's War, Abbe Jean-Louis Le Loutre led an insurrection consisting of Acadians and Mi’kmaq to recapture the capital in the siege of Annapolis Royal (1744). Acadian François Dupont Duvivier, who had led the Canso raid, led the second siege attempt against Fort Anne, with a force of 200 troops. Grand Pre had been the staging ground for the French and Mi’kmaw sieges of Annapolis Royal. Two Minas inhabitants, Armand Bigeau and Joseph LeBlanc dit Le Maigre, had traded with Louisbourg and assisted the supplying of Duvivier's forces by sea. Both transported Duvivier's force from Louisbourg to Baie Verte and then accompanied the expedition to Annapolis Royal and had served as scoutes and couriers. Duvivier arrived at Fort Anne on September 6, 1744. The first night he erected shelters. He used Joseph-Nicolas Gautier's house for his Headquarters. After both sieges, Gorham demanded to take control of Grand Pre. The British burned the dwellings of both Bigeau and 'Le Maigre' at Minas. In Annapolis, they burned the home of Gautier and imprisoning him and his family at Fort Anne until they escaped after 10 months. The British also burned the homes of Acadian pilots Paul Doucett and Charles Pelerain.

During the siege of 1745, the French officer Marin was required to withdraw from siege to protect Louisbourg from a British attack. He reported that upon hearing the news of Louisbourg and his own withdrawal from Annapolis Royal, the Acadians were "overpowered with grief from the apprehension of remaining in the disposition of the enemy". Marin had taken British prisoners at Annapolis and remained with them in the bay at Cobequid, where an Acadian said that the French soldiers should have "left their [the British] carcasses behind and brought their skins". The British officer also deemed there was enough evidence to hold Gautier's wife and Charles Raymond for collaborating with the siege.

After the siege of Louisbourg (1745), the Wabanaki Confederacy members from Acadia conducted a campaign against British civilians along the New England/ Acadia border. (Such campaigns were repeated in 1746 and 1747). After the first siege of Louisbourg (1745), the British deported thousands of "French Colonists" on Île-Royale to France. There were Acadians among those deported.

At the same time, in July 1745, the other English detachment landed at Port-la-Joye. Under the command of Joseph de Pont Duvivier, the French had a garrison of 20 French troops (Compagnies Franches de la Marine) at Port-la-Joye. The troops fled and New Englanders burned the capital to the ground. Duvivier and the twenty men retreated up the Northeast River (Hillsborough River), pursued by the New Englanders until the French troops received reinforcements from the Acadian militia and the Mi’kmaq. The French troops and their allies were able to drive the New Englanders to their boats, nine New Englanders killed, wounded or made prisoner. The New Englanders took six Acadian hostages, who would be executed if the Acadians or Mi’kmaq rebelled against New England control.

==== Siege of Port Toulouse ====
During the siege of Port Toulouse, on May 2, 1745, Pepperell sent Jeremiah Moulton with 70 soldiers and two vessels to capture the fortified village of Port Toulouse. The New Englanders were only able to capture a single sloop and burn a few houses before being repelled by the French soldiers, Acadians and Mi’kmaq. They wounded three New Englanders when they were retreating. Eight days later, on May 10, the New Englanders returned with a force four times larger – 270 men. They burned every standing structure at Port Toulouse, demolished the fort, and desecrated a cemetery where Mi’kmaq were buried. Some French were killed in the assault and others were taken prisoner.

After the failure of the French Duc d'Anville Expedition to recapture Annapolis Royal, Nova Scotia Governor Paul Mascarene told Acadians to avoid "deluding Hopes of Returning under the Dominion of France". One French officer noted that when the French troops withdrew from Annapolis Royal, the Acadians were alarmed and disappointed, and felt they were being abandoned to British retribution. The following year, Acadians helped the French to destroy British troops in the Battle of Grand Pré.

==== Battle of Grand Pre ====
Broussard and other Acadians supported the French soldiers in the Battle of Grand Pré. Ramezay elicited more support from the Acadians, enjoyed more of their collaboration, than the other enterprises. He reported to have enlisted 25 Acadians from Piziquid to Grand Pre ready to bear arms. (Some Acadians may not have supported French efforts in Acadia. Louis Liénard de Beaujeu de Villemond stated in his journal that while the Canadian troops were passing several villages near present day Truro, Captain Coulon on his approach march to the battle sent a detachment of troops at "daybreak to Copequit to block all the paths because the ill intentioned inhabitants could undertake to pass and alert the English to our march". Captain Charles Morris reported the French were supported by "... about 100 of the Neutral French join'd with them". As well, local intelligence pinpointed Noble's billets with stunning accuracy. Near the end of the battle Morris spied an enemy group "clothed like the Inhabitants whom afterward we were inform'd they were, they were all arm'd & having assisted the enemy in the night they were getting off to prevent discovery but unluckily passing into the woods came in full sight of us." The French fleet movements in Nova Scotia waters before the massacre enjoyed the help of Acadian pilots, including Nicholas Gautier and his two sons.

==== Louisbourg ====
After the fall of Louisbourg, in conjunction with Father Charles Germain and Joseph Marin de la Malgue, Acadian and Mi'kmaw militias (40 Acadians and 100 Mi'kmaq) from Tatamagouche repeatedly attacked the British who were occupying the fort and the prevent any British settlements from being established in Acadia.

=== Father Le Loutre's War ===
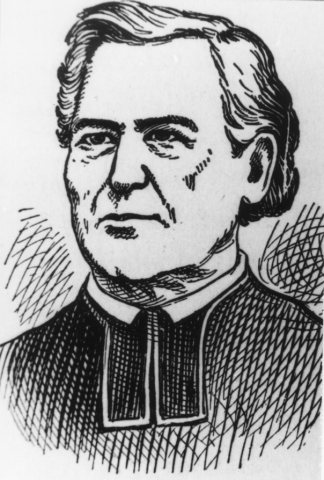
Father Jean-Louis Le Loutre – "the soul of the Acadian resistance"

Within 18 months of establishing Halifax, and the start of Father Le Loutre's War, the British took firm control of the Nova Scotia peninsula by building fortifications in all the major Acadian communities: present-day Windsor (Fort Edward); Grand Pré (Fort Vieux Logis) and Chignecto (Fort Lawrence). A British fort already existed at the other major Acadian centre of Annapolis Royal, Nova Scotia and Cobequid remained without a fort. Le Loutre is reported to have said that "the English might build as many Forts as they pleased but he wou'd take care that they shou'd not come out of them, for he was resolved to torment them with his Indians...." Richard Bulkeley wrote that between 1749 and 1755, Nova Scotia "was kept in an uninterrupted state of war by the Acadians ... and the reports of an officer commanding Fort Edward (Nova Scotia), [indicated he] could not be conveyed [to Halifax] with less an escort than an officer and thirty men."

The Mi’kmaq attacked New England Rangers in the siege of Grand Pre and Battle at St. Croix. Upon the founding of Halifax (1749), Acadians and Mi’kmaq conducted twelve raids on the capital region; the most significant raid was the one in 1751 on Dartmouth. They also resisted the initial British occupation of Chignecto (1750) and later fought against them in the Battle of Beausejour (1755).

Throughout Father Le Loutre's War, English speakers began calling the Acadians "French neutral", a label that would remain in common use through the 1750s. British people used the term sarcastically in derision. This stance led to the Acadians becoming known at times as the "neutral French". In 1749, Governor Cornwallis again asked the Acadians to take the oath and although he was unsuccessful, he took no drastic action against them. The following governor, Peregrine Hopson, continued the conciliatory policy towards the Acadians.

==== Acadian Exodus ====
During the war, Acadians revealed their political allegiance by leaving mainland Nova Scotia. From 1749–55, there was massive Acadian migration out of British-occupied mainland Nova Scotia and into French-occupied Île Saint-Jean (Prince Edward Island), Île Royale (Cape Breton) and present-day New Brunswick. A prominent Acadian who transported Acadians to Île St. Jean and Île Royal was Joseph-Nicolas Gautier. While some Acadians were forced to leave, for others the act of leaving British-occupied territory for French-occupied territory was an act of resistance to the British occupation. On one occasion, when a British naval patrol intercepted Acadians in a vessel en route to Île St. Jean, an Acadian passenger said, "They chose rather to quit their lands and estates than possess them upon the terms propos'd by the English governor." The leader of the Exodus was Father Jean-Louis Le Loutre, whom the British gave the code name "Moses". Historian Micheline Johnson described Le Loutre as "the soul of the Acadian resistance."

==== Battle at Chignecto (1750) ====
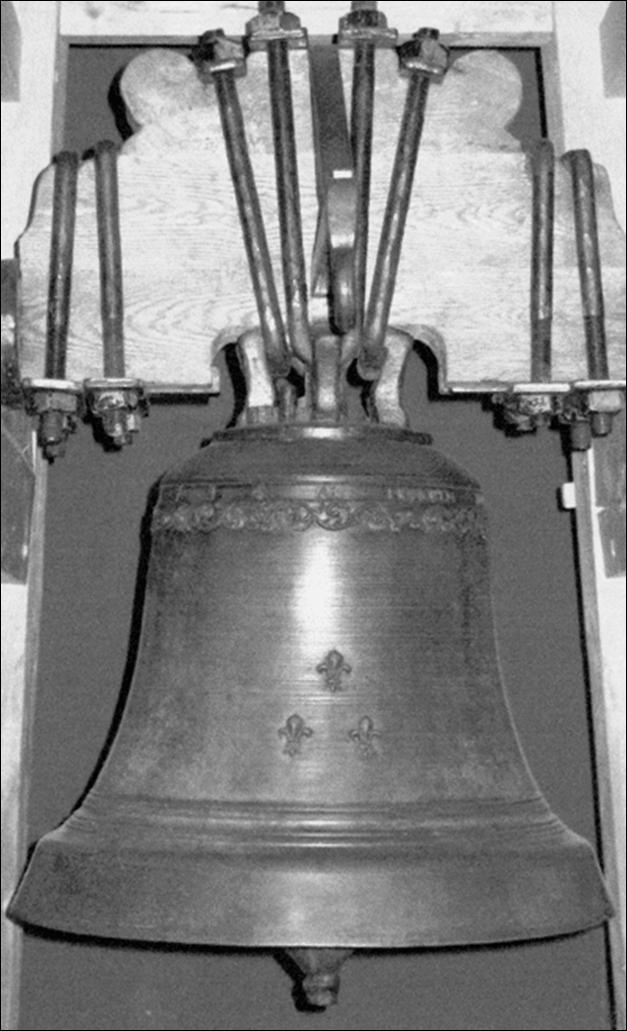
Le Loutre retrieved this bell from the Beaubassin church during the Battle at Chignecto (1750): (Le Loutre retrieved the bell again from the Beausejour Cathedral during the Battle of Beausejour).

In May 1750, Lawrence was unsuccessful in getting a base at Chignecto because Le Loutre burned the village of Beaubassin, preventing Lawrence from using its supplies to establish a fort. (According to the historian Frank Patterson, the Acadians at Cobequid also burned their homes as they retreated from the British to Tatamagouche, Nova Scotia in 1754.) Lawrence retreated, but he returned in September 1750.

On September 3, Rous, Lawrence and Gorham led over 700 men to Chignecto, where Mi’kmaq and Acadians opposed their landing. They killed twenty British, who in turn killed several Mi’kmaq. Le Loutre's militia eventually withdrew, burning the rest of the Acadians' crops and houses as they went. Le Loutre and the Acadian militia leader Joseph Broussard resisted the British assault. The British troops defeated the resistance and began construction of Fort Lawrence near the site of the ruins of Beaubassin. The work on the fort proceeded rapidly and they completed the facility within weeks. To limit the British to peninsular Nova Scotia, the French also began to fortify the Chignecto and its approaches; they constructed Fort Beausejour and two satellite forts: one at present-day Strait Shores, New Brunswick (Fort Gaspareaux) and the other at present-day Saint John, New Brunswick (Fort Menagoueche).

During these months, 35 Mi’kmaq and Acadians ambushed Ranger Captain Francis Bartelo, killing him and six of his men while taking seven others captive. The Mi’kmaq conducted ritual torture of the captives throughout the night, which had a chilling effect on the New Englanders.

==== Siege of Grand Pre ====
On November 27, 1749, in the siege of Grand Pre, 300 Mi’kmaq, Maliseet, Penobscot and Acadians attacked Fort Vieux Logis at Grand Pre. The fort was under the command of Captain Handfield of the Cornwallis' Regiment. The Native and Acadian militia killed the sentries (guards) who were firing on them. The Natives then captured Lieutenant John Hamilton and eighteen soldiers under his command (including Handfield's son), while surveying the fort's environs. After the capture of the British soldiers, the native and Acadian militias made several attempts over the next week to lay siege to the fort before breaking off the engagement. When Gorham’s Rangers arrived the militia had already departed with the prisoners to Chignecto. The Acadians were then involved in the Battle at St. Croix, where one of them was killed.

==== Raid on Dartmouth (1751) ====
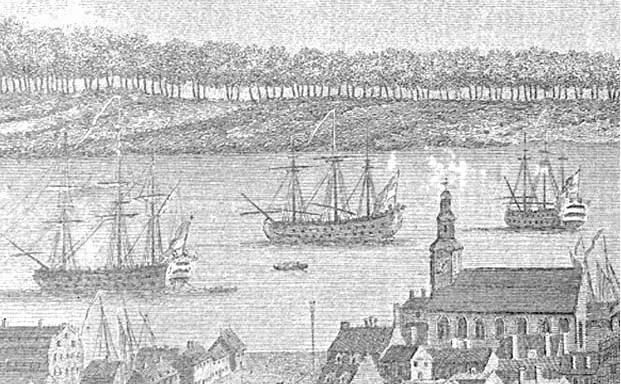
British erect a wooden palisade along Dartmouth in response to the Raid, opposite side of the harbour from the Great Pontack (Lower left corner), present-day Historic Properties.

The Raid on Dartmouth occurred during Father Le Loutre's War on May 13, 1751 when an Acadian and Mi’kmaw militia from Chignecto, under the command of Acadian Joseph Broussard, raided Dartmouth, Nova Scotia, destroying the town and killing twenty British villagers. On May 13, 1751 before sunrise, Broussard led sixty Mi'kmaq and Acadians to attack Dartmouth again, in what would be known as the "Dartmouth Massacre". Broussard and the others killed twenty settlers and more were taken prisoner. (Note: Cornwallis' official report mentioned that four settlers were killed and six soldiers taken prisoner. See Governor Cornwallis to Board of Trade, letter, June 24, 1751, referenced in Harry Chapman, p. 29; John Wilson reported that fifteen people were killed immediately, seven were wounded, three of whom would die in hospital; six were carried away and never seen again" (See A genuine narrative of the transactions in Nova Scotia since the settlement, June 1749, till August the 5th, 1751 [microform] : in which the nature, soil, and produce of the country are related, with the particular attempts of the Indians to disturb the colony / by John Wilson); John Salusbury recorded in his diary that approximately twenty were killed (See Expeditions of Honour: The Journal of John Salusbury in Halifax, Nova Scotia, 1749–53. Edited by Ronald Rompkey. Newark: University of Delaware Press. 1982. p. 111)) This raid was one of seven the Natives and Acadians would conduct against the town during the war.

The British retaliated by sending several armed companies to Chignecto. A few French defenders were killed and the dikes were breached. Hundreds of acres of crops were ruined, which was disastrous for the Acadians and the French troops.

Immediately after the raid, a wooden palisade was erected around the town plot. Mi'kmaw and Acadian attacks continued throughout the French and Indian War, which ended fourteen years after Dartmouth was first settled. (For example, in the spring of 1759, there was another attack on Fort Clarence, in which five soldiers were killed.) After the initial raid, no new settlers were placed in Dartmouth again for the next thirty years. Of the 151 settlers who arrived in Dartmouth in August 1750, only half remained two years later. By the end of war (1763), Dartmouth was only left with 78 settlers.

Acadians exerted their political resistance by refusing to trade with the British. By 1754, the Acadians sent no produce to the Halifax market. When British merchants tried to buy directly from the Acadians, they were refused. Acadians also refused to supply Fort Edward with firewood. Lawrence saw the need to neutralize the Acadian military threat. To defeat Louisbourg, the British destroyed the lines of supply by deporting the Acadians.

=== French and Indian War ===
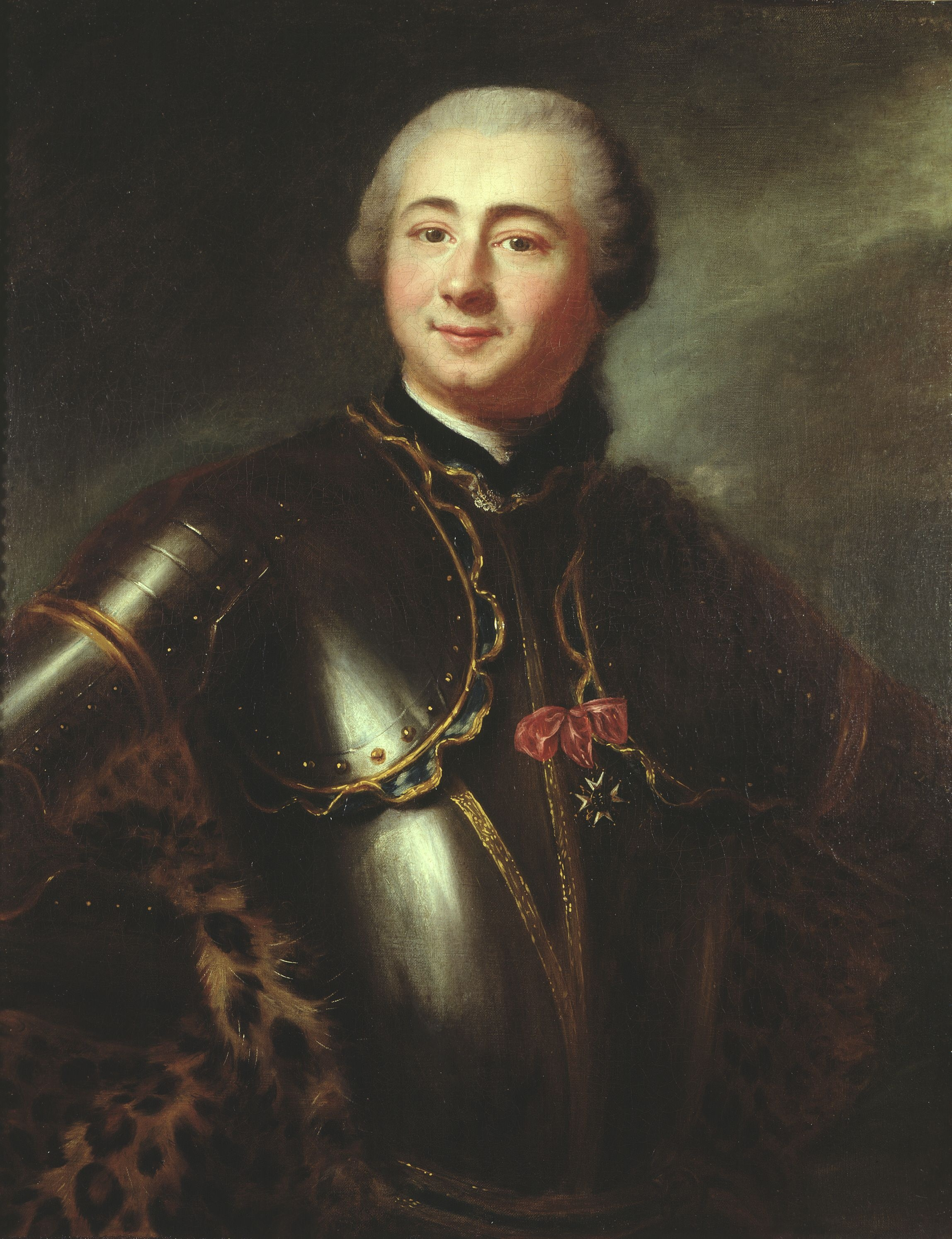
Charles Deschamps de Boishébert et de Raffetot

In 1753, French troops from Canada marched south and seized and fortified the Ohio Valley. Britain protested the invasion and claimed Ohio for itself. On May 28, 1754, the French and Indian War (the North American theatre of the Seven Years' War) began with the Battle of Jumonville Glen. French Officer Ensign de Jumonville and a third of his escort was killed by a British patrol led by George Washington. In retaliation the French and the Indians defeated the British at Fort Necessity. Washington lost a third of his force, and surrendered. Major General Edward Braddock's troops were defeated in the Battle of the Monongahela, and William Johnson's troops stopped the French advance at Lake George.

In Acadia, the primary British objective was to defeat the French fortifications at Beausejour and Louisbourg. The British saw the Acadians' allegiance to the French and the Wabanaki Confederacy as a military threat. Father Le Loutre's War had created the conditions for total war; British civilians had not been spared and, as Governor Charles Lawrence and the Nova Scotia Council saw it, Acadian civilians had provided intelligence, sanctuary, and logistical support while others had fought against the British.

After the British capture of Beausejour, the plan to capture Louisbourg included cutting trade to the Fortress in order to weaken the Fortress and, in turn, weaken the French ability to supply the Mi'kmaq in their warfare against the British. According to Historian Stephen Patterson, more than any other single factor—including the massive assault that eventually forced the surrender of Louisbourg—the supply problem brought an end to French power in the region. Lawrence realized he could reduce the military threat and weaken Fortress Louisbourg by deporting the Acadians, thus cutting off supplies to the fort. During the Expulsion, French Officer Charles Deschamps de Boishébert led the Mi'kmaq and the Acadians in a guerrilla war against the British. According to Louisbourg account books, by late 1756 the French had regularly dispensed supplies to 700 natives. From 1756 to the fall of Louisbourg in 1758, the French made regular payments to Chief Jean-Baptiste Cope and other natives for British scalps.

==== Battle of Petitcodiac ====
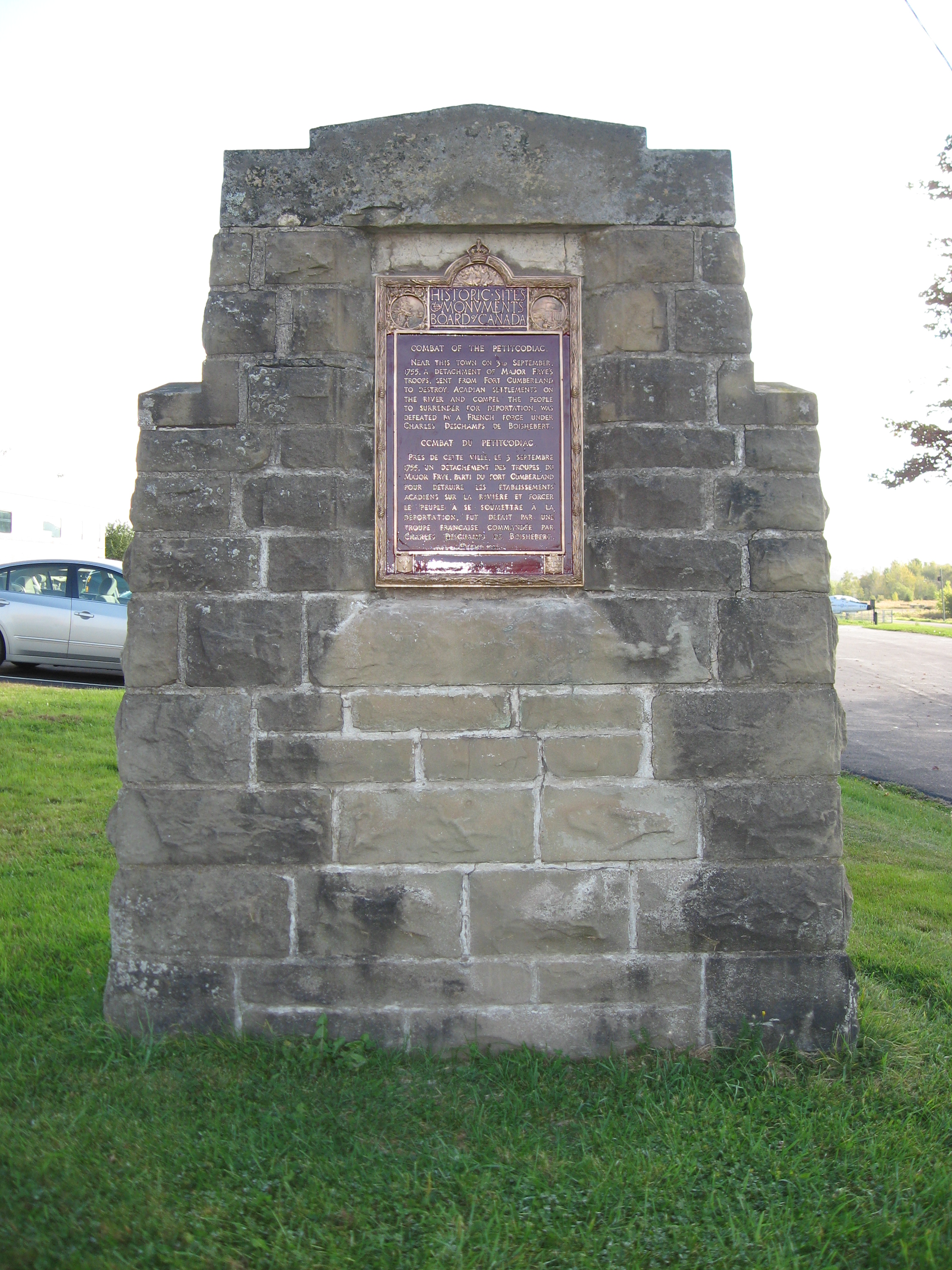
Battle of Petitcodiac

Charles Deschamps de Boishébert was a French militia commander who became a resistance leader. Based in the Miramichi River valley, he helped Acadians fleeing the British deportation operations escape to Quebec. After the fall of Beausejour, Monckton sent a naval squadron to evict him from the satellite fort at the mouth of the Saint John River. Knowing that he could not defend his position, Bosishebert destroyed the fort. When he received word that the British were planning an expedition to the Petitcodiac River, he hurried to Chipoudy, where he organized 120 Acadians, Maliseets and Mi'kmaq into a guerrilla fighting force.

On September 2, the expedition began these clearing operations on settlements in and around the Village-des-Blanchard. While the main body worked on the eastern bank of the river, a detachment of fifty or sixty under John Indicot was despatched to the western bank. (Note: Note: Grenier (2008), p. 180 locates this battle at Chipoudy rather than at Petitcodiac. There is a primary source, however, of a letter written by Major Jedediah Preble that indicates the battle happened in "Shipodia" (See Peter Landry. The Lion and the Lily. Trafford Press. 2007. p. 535)) When they set fire to the village church, Boishébert and three hundred men attacked. The British retreated behind a dyke and were in a near panic when Frye landed with the remainder of the force and took command. After three hours of spirited fighting, Frye eventually extracted the force to the boats and retreated. Twenty two British were killed and another six were wounded. (Note: The French reported that eighty British were killed (see Grenier (2008), p. 180).) Ranger Joseph Gorham was wounded in the battle.

==== Battle of Bloody Creek ====
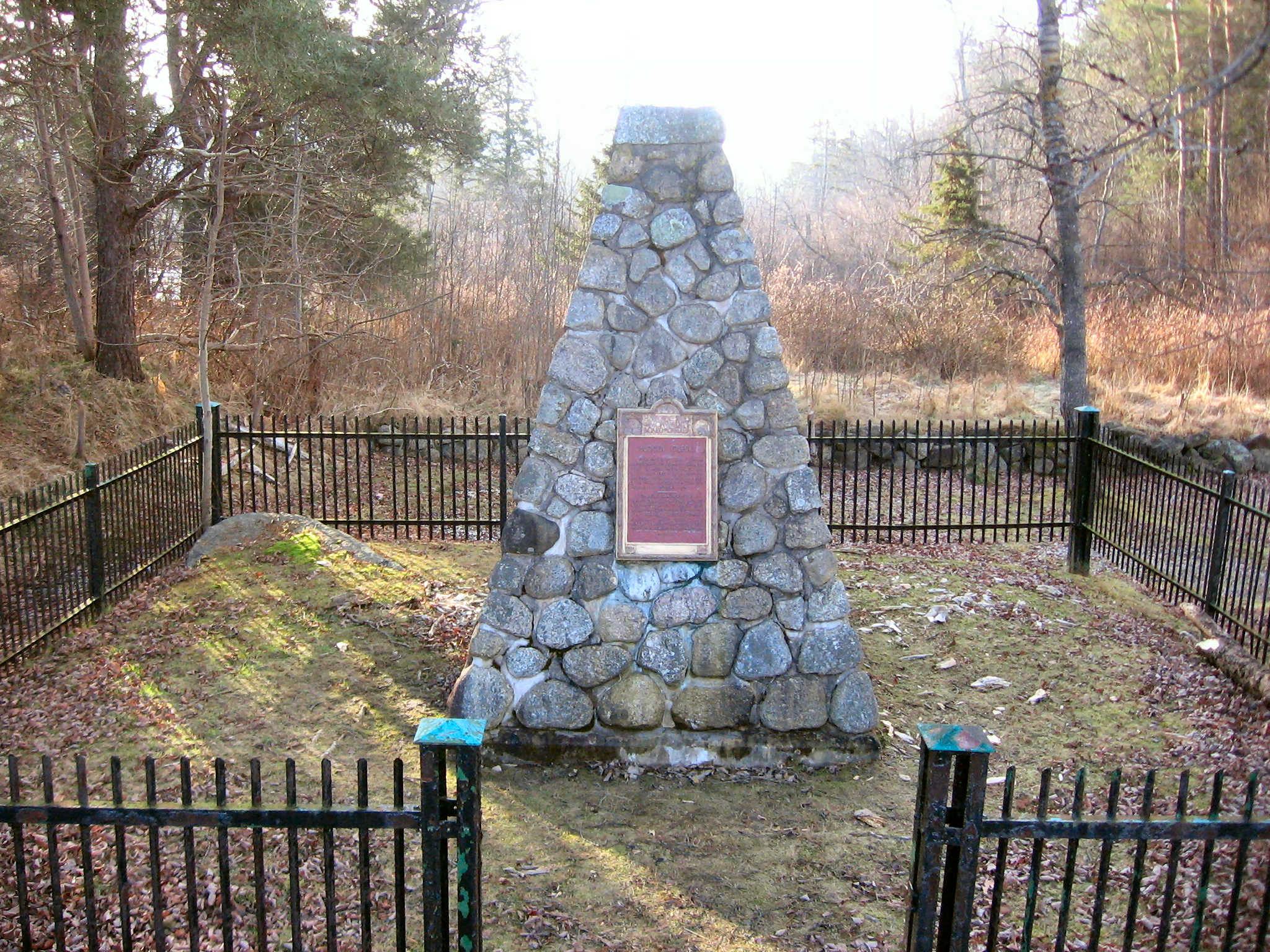
Battle of Bloody Creek (1757) monument

Led by Acadian William Johnson (Guillaume Jeanson), (Note: Johnson's father had been in the British garrison at Annapolis Royal and whose mother was Acadian, was said to have been the leader of the attackers.) a group of Mi'kmaq and Acadians attacked the British force in the Battle of Bloody Creek. Marching on foot along the south shore of the Annapolis River, the British force was exposed to wet and cold before giving up their search for the prisoners. They were crossing a bridge on the René Forêt River on the morning of December 8 when the Mi'kmaq and Acadians attacked. The British made a brief stand and suffered a high number of casualties, including Captain Pigou, before retreating back to Annapolis Royal.

On another occasion, 226 Acadians (36 families) being deported from Annapolis Royal, Nova Scotia on the ship Pembroke rebelled against the British crew. After fighting off an attack by another British vessel on February 9, 1756, the Acadians took 8 British prisoners to Quebec.

==== Raids on Piziquid (Fort Edward) ====
In December 1755, Acadian and Mi'kmaw militia repeated attacked British troops working to kill their livestock, killing one workman which left the others to flee to Halifax.

In September 1756, a group of 100 Acadians ambushed a party of thirteen soldiers who were working outside the fort. Seven were taken prisoner and six escaped back to the fort.

In April 1757, a band of Acadian and Mi'kmaq raided a warehouse near Fort Edward, killing thirteen British soldiers. After loading with what provisions they could carry, they set fire to the building. A few days later, the same partisans also raided Fort Cumberland. Because of the strength of the Acadian militia and Mi'kmaw militia, British officer John Knox wrote that "In the year 1757 we were said to be Masters of the province of Nova Scotia, or Acadia, which, however, was only an imaginary possession." He continues to state that the situation in the province was so precarious for the British that the "troops and inhabitants" at Fort Edward, Fort Sackville and Lunenburg "could not be reputed in any other light than as prisoners."

==== Raids on Chignecto (Fort Cumberland) ====
The Acadians and Mi’kmaq also resisted in the Chignecto region. They were victorious in the Battle of Petitcodiac (1755). In the spring of 1756, a wood-gathering party from Fort Monckton (former Fort Gaspareaux), was ambushed and nine were scalped. In the summer of 1756, Boishebert burned an English vessel at Bay Vert, killing seven and taking one prisoner. In April 1757, after raiding Fort Edward, the same band of Acadian and Mi'kmaw partisans raided Fort Cumberland, killing and scalping two men and taking two prisoners. July 20, 1757 Mi'kmaq killed 23 and captured two of Gorham's rangers outside Fort Cumberland near present-day Jolicure, New Brunswick. In March 1758, forty Acadian and Mi'kmaq attacked a schooner at Fort Cumberland and killed its master and two sailors. In the winter of 1759, the Mi'kmaq ambushed five British soldiers on patrol while they were crossing a bridge near Fort Cumberland. They were ritually scalped and their bodies mutilated as was common in frontier warfare. During the night of April 4, 1759, using canoes, a force of Acadians and French captured the transport. At dawn they attacked the ship Moncton and chased it for five hours down the Bay of Fundy. Although the Moncton escaped, its crew suffered one killed and two wounded.

==== Raids on Lawrencetown ====
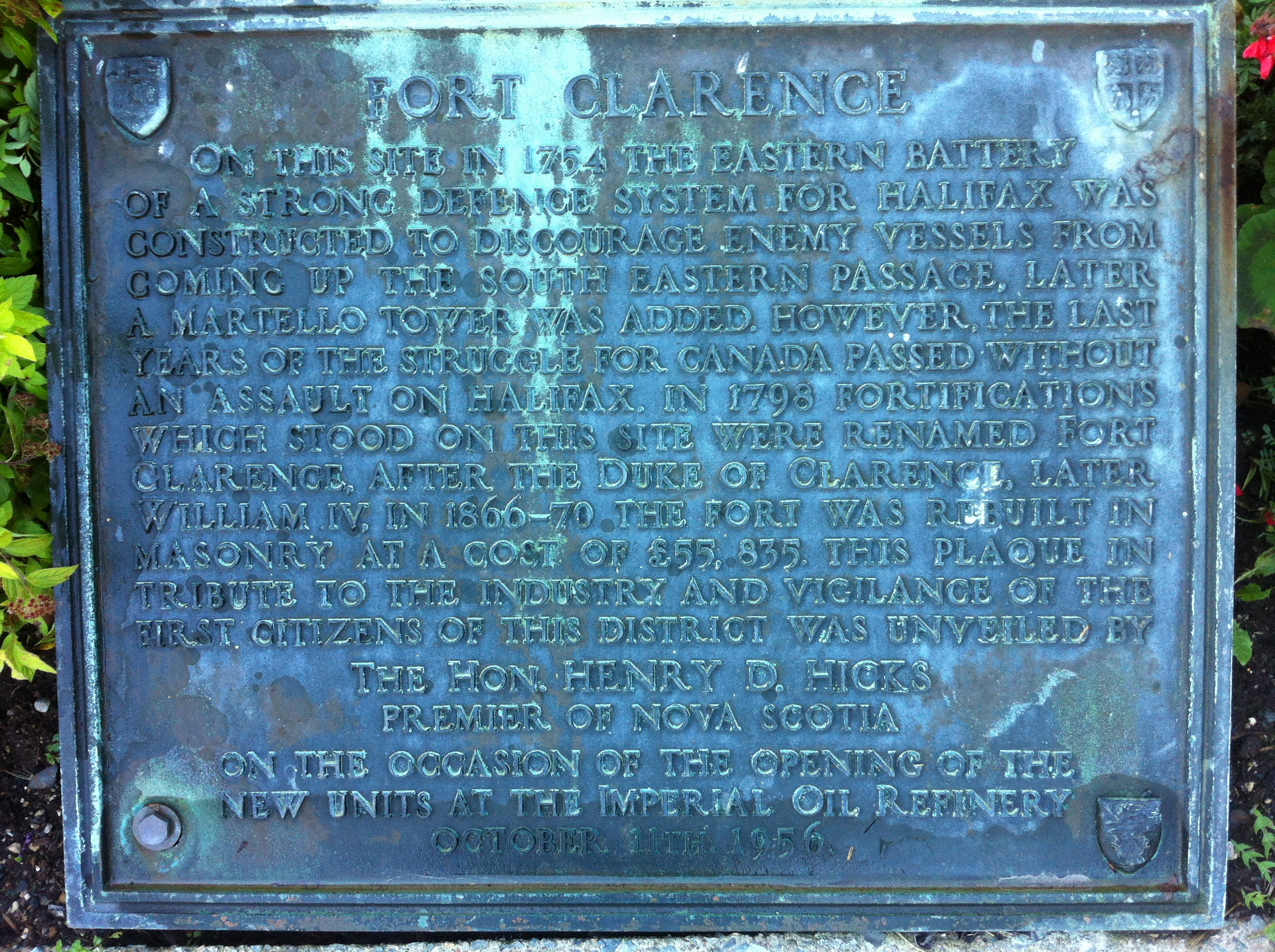
Eastern Battery Plaque, Dartmouth, Nova Scotia

By June 1757, the settlers had to be withdrawn completely from the settlement of Lawrencetown (established 1754) because the number of Indian raids eventually prevented settlers from leaving their houses.

In nearby Dartmouth, Nova Scotia, in the spring of 1759, there was another Mi'kmaq attack on Eastern Battery, in which five soldiers were killed. (In the same year, further east at Canso, Acadians took 3 British vessels.Murdoch (1865), p. 366)

==== Lunenburg campaign ====
The Lunenburg campaign (1758) was executed by the Mi'kmaw militia and Acadian militia against the Foreign Protestants who the British had settled on the Lunenburg Peninsula during the French and Indian War. The British deployed Joseph Gorham and his Rangers along with Captain Rudolf Faesch and regular troops of the 60th Regiment of Foot to defend Lunenburg. The campaign was so successful, by November of 1758, the members of the House of Assembly for Lunenburg stated "they received no benefit from His Majesty's Troops or Rangers" and required more protection.

==== Raids on Maine ====
In present-day Maine, the Mi’kmaq and the Maliseet raided numerous New England villages. At the end of April 1755, they raided Gorham, Maine, killing two men and a family. Next they appeared in New-Boston (Gray) and through the neighbouring towns destroying the plantations. On May 13, they raided Frankfort (Dresden), where two men were killed and a house burned. The same day they raided Sheepscot (Newcastle), and took five prisoners. Two were killed in North Yarmouth on May 29 and one taken captive. They shot one person at Teconnet. They took prisoners at Fort Halifax; two prisoners taken at Fort Shirley (Dresden). They took two captive at New Gloucester as they worked on the local fort.

On 13 August 1758 Boishebert left Miramichi, New Brunswick with 400 soldiers, including Acadians whom he led from Port Toulouse. They marched to Fort St George (Thomaston, Maine). His detachment reached there on 9 September but was caught in an ambush and had to withdraw. They next went to Munduncook (Friendship, Maine). They wounded eight British settlers and killed others. This was Boishébert's last Acadian expedition. From there, Boishebert and the Acadians went to Quebec and fought in the Battle of Quebec (1759).

==== Raids on Halifax ====
On 2 April 1756, Mi'kmaq received payment from the Governor of Quebec for 12 British scalps taken at Halifax. Acadian Pierre Gautier, son of Joseph-Nicolas Gautier, led Mi’kmaw warriors from Louisbourg on three raids against Halifax in 1757. In each raid, Gautier took prisoners or scalps or both. The last raid happened in September and Gautier went with four Mi’kmaq and killed and scalped two British men at the foot of Citadel Hill. (Pierre went on to participate in the Battle of Restigouche.)

Arriving on the provincial vessel King George, four companies of Rogers Rangers (500 rangers) were at Dartmouth April 8 until May 28 awaiting the siege of Louisbourg (1758). While there they scoured the woods to stop raids on the capital.

In July 1759, Mi'kmaq and Acadians kill five British in Dartmouth, opposite McNabb's Island.

==== Siege of Louisbourg (1758) ====
Acadian militias participated in the defence of Louisbourg in 1757 and 1758. In preparation of a British assault on Louisbourg in 1757, all the tribes of the Wabanaki Confederacy were present including Acadian militia. Without any result from their efforts, the number of Mi’kmaq and Acadians who showed the following year were much lower. The precedent for such a decline in numbers was set in the two attacks that happened in the siege of Annapolis 1744, the Mi’kmaq and Acadians appearing in much less numbers for the second assault after the first one had failed.

New Englanders came ashore at Pointe Platee (Flat Point) during the siege of 1745. In 1757 and again in 1758, the Natives and Acadian militias were stationed at the potential landing beaches of Pointe Platee and one further away Anse d la Cormorandiere (Kennington Cove).

In the siege of Louisbourg (1758), Acadian and Mi’kmaw militias began to arrive in Louisboug around May 7, 1758. By the end of the month 118 Acadians arrived and about 30 Mi’kmaq from Ile St. Jean and the Mirimachi. Boishebert arrived in June with 70 more Acadia militia members from Ile St. Jean and 60 Mi’kmaw militia. On June 2, The British vessels arrived and the militias went to their defensive positions on the shore. The 200 British vessels waited for six days, until the weather conditions were right, before they attacked on June 8. Four companies of Rogers Rangers under the command of George Scott were the first to come ashore in advance of James Wolfe. The British came ashore at Anse de la Cormorandiere and "continuous fire was poured upon the invaders". The Mi'kmaw and Acadian militias fought the Rangers until the latter were supported by Scott and James Wolfe, which led to the militias retreat. Seventy of the militia were captured and 50 others scalped. The Mi'kmaw and Acadian militias killed 100 British, some of whom were wounded and drowned. On June 16, 50 Mi'kmaq returned to the cove and took 5 seaman captive, firing at the other British marines.

On July 15, Boishebert arrived with Acadian and Mi'kmaw militias and attacked Captain Sutherland and the Rogers Rangers posted at Northeast harbour. When Scott and Wolfe's reinforcements arrived, 100 Rangers from McCurdey and Brewer's Companies were sent to track them down. They only captured one Mi'kmaw. (From here the Rangers went on to conduct the St. John River campaign, in part, hoping to capture Boishebert.)

==== Cape Breton ====
Soon after the siege of Louisbourg, Major Dalling went with 30 of James Rogers rangers to Spanish Bay (Sydney, Nova Scotia) and took Acadians prisoner. James Rogers' company made a raid on an Acadian village on the Bras d'Or Lake and "flushed out" 18 armed Acadian militia fighters and 100 other men, women and children. In May 1759, the Mi’kmaw militia were making raids on Louisbourg and on June 1, the four companies of Rogers’ Rangers and the Mi’kmaq fought a "hot skimmish" until they eventually retreated.

==== St. John River campaign ====
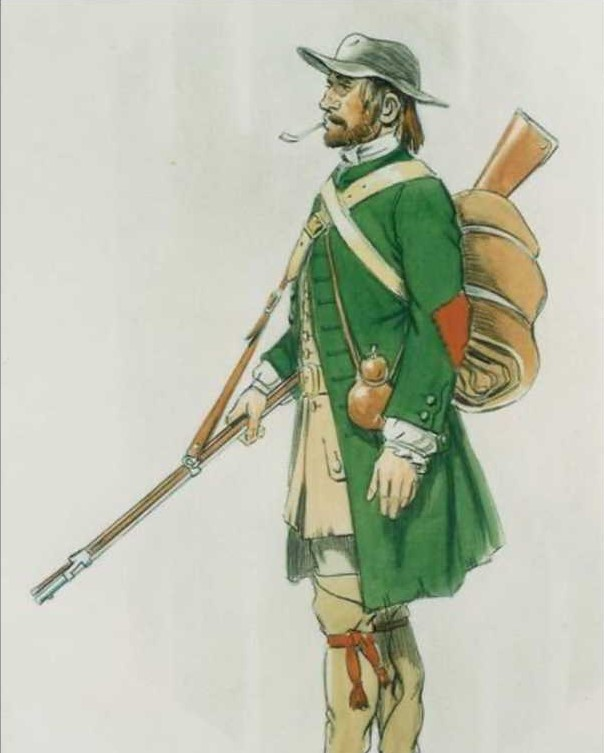
Joseph Godin dit Bellefontaine

Acadia militias resisted during the St. John River campaign and the Petitcodiac River campaign. The Acadian militia along the St. John River was led by Acadian Joseph Godin dit Bellefontaine, Sieur de Beauséjour, who had led the militias since 1749. The command at Fort Frederick was not convinced the village was totally destroyed and sent at least three more expeditions up river to Ste Anne between July and September 1759. The soldiers captured some Acadians along the way, burned their homes, destroyed their crops and slaughtered their cattle. The September expedition involved more than 90 men. At present-day French Lake on the Oromocto River, they met fierce resistance from the Acadians, and resulted in the death of at least seven rangers.

On 18 February 1759, Lieutenant Hazen and 22 men arrived at Sainte-Anne des Pays-Bas. They pillaged and burned the village of 147 buildings, including two Mass-houses and all of the barns and stables. They burned a large store-house, and with it a large quantity of hay, wheat, peas, oats, etc., killing 212 horses, about 5 head of cattle, a large number of hogs and so forth. They also burned the church (located just west of Old Government House, Fredericton). Only a handful of Acadians were found in the area, most had already fled north with their families.

Major Joseph Godin dit Bellefontaine and a group of Acadians ambushed the Rangers. The rangers scalped six Acadians and took six prisoners during this raid. Major Joseph Godin dit Bellefontaine, Sieur de Beauséjour (Seigneur of Pointe Ste-Anne) was Commander of the Acadian Militia of the St-John River valley. During the Seven Years' War he supported and encouraged the Indians in their opposition to the British and even led some of their war parties. In February 1759, they killed Godin's daughter and three of his grandchildren in front of him.

==== Petiticodiac campaign ====
In June 1758, Lieutenant Meech of Benoni Danks' Rangers along with fifty-five men advanced up the Petitcodiac River, suspecting that this was where the Acadian and Mi’kmaw raids originated. They made contact with 40 Acadians but were unable to catch them.

On July 1, 1758, Danks himself began to pursue the Acadians. They arrived at present day Moncton and Danks’ Rangers ambushed about thirty Acadians, who were led by Joseph Broussard (Beausoleil). Many were driven into the river, three of them were killed and scalped, and others were captured. Broussard was seriously wounded.

In September 1758, Rogers Rangers burned a village of 100 buildings. The Acadians captured five of the British troops and retreated with then to the Miramichi. The Acadians took prisoner William Caesar McCormick of William Stark's rangers and his detachment of three rangers and two light infantry privates from the 35th Regiment. They were taken to Miramichi and then Restogouch. (They were kept by Pierre du Calvet who later released them to Halifax.)

November 12, 1758, Danks' Rangers sailed up the river and returned the next day with four men and twelve women and children as prisoners. The prisoners notified Danks about the location of Joseph Broussard's home (present day Boundary Creek). Danks' company sailed immediately up the Petitodiac to attack Broussard's home. By the time Danks arrived the house was vacant. Danks killed the livestock and burned the fields and village.

The Rangers returned to the river. Captain Silvanus Cobb continued to ferry Rangers up and down the river to destroy the houses and crops over two nights, November 13–14. On November 14, Acadian resistance appeared early in the morning. Two of Danks' Rangers were missing. The Rangers overwhelmed the Acadians once Danks' reinforcement of a platoon of Rangers arrived. The Rangers took a dozen women and children hostage. Joseph Gorham reported that he had burned over a hundred homes and Danks reported he destroyed twenty three buildings.

The Rangers then returned to Fort Frederick at the mouth of the St. John River with the prisoners.

==== Plains of Abraham ====
Under command of Boishébert, the Acadian militia (150 fighters) took part in the defence of Quebec during the summer of 1759 and then in the Battle of the Plains of Abraham (1759). In the winter he returned for the last time to Acadia, to gather reinforcements for the defence of Canada and to restore the morale of the discouraged Acadians.

==== Battle of Restigouche ====
An Acadian militia and Mi’kmaw militia, totalling 1500 fighters, organized in the Battle of Restigouche. The Acadians arrived in about 20 schooners and small boats. Along with the French, they continued up river to draw the British fleet closer to the Acadian community of Pointe-à-la-Batterie, where they were ready to launch a surprise attack on the English. The Acadians sunk a number of their vessels to create a blockade, upon which the Acadian and Mi’kmaq fired at the ships. On 27 June, the British succeeded in maneuvering just beyond the chain of sunken ships. Once the British were range of the battery, they fired on the battery. This skirmish lasted all night and was repeated with various breaks from 28 June to 3 July, when the British overwhelmed Pointe à la Batterie, burning 150 to 200 buildings that made up the Acadian village community at Pointe à la Batterie.

The militias retreated and re-grouped with the French frigate Machault. They sunk more schooners to create another blockade. They created two new batteries, one on the north shore at Pointe de la Mission (today Listuguj, Quebec), and one on the south shore at Pointe aux Sauvages (today Campbellton, New Brunswick). They created blockade with schooners at Pointe aux Sauvages. On July 7 British commander Byron spent the day getting rid of the battery at Pointe aux Sauvages and later returned to the task of destroying the Machault. By the morning of 8 July the Scarborough and the Repulse were in range of the blockade and face to face with the Machault. The British made two attempts to defeat the batteries and the militias held out. On the third attempt, they were successful.

=== Treaty of Paris (1763) ===
The fifty years of quasi-uninterrupted hostilities on the Acadian territory were finally resolved by the Treaty of Paris (1763), in which the French were expelled from British North America; they retained only a small portion of Louisiana on that continent. The fate of the Acadians—expulsion from their homelands—was due to their reliance on their clerics, who employed them mercilessly as tools of a failed policy of empire. As Vaudreuil remarked in 1760 to his superior, "Les malheurs des Accadiens sont beaucoup moins leur ouvrage que le fruit des sollicitations et des demarches des missionnaires." Thomas Pichon would write in his Lettres et Memoires pour servir a l'Histoire du Cap Breton that same year:

Nous avons six missionnaires dont l'occupation perpetuelle est de porter les esprits au fanatisme et a la vengeance... Je ne puis supporter dans nos pretres ces odieuses declamations qu'ils font tous les jours aux sauvages: 'Les Anglois sont les ennemis de Dieu, les compagnons du Diable.'

== American Revolution ==
In the lead up to the American Revolution, Nova Scotia prepared for an American assault. A militia of 100 Acadians from Clare and Yarmouth was raised and marched to Halifax (1774). Simon Thibodeau fought the American patriots while in Quebec during the American Revolution.

The Capture of Fort Bute signalled the opening of Spanish intervention in the American Revolutionary War on the side of France and the United States. Mustering an ad hoc army of Spanish regulars, Acadian militia, and native levies under Gilbert Antoine de St. Maxent, Bernardo de Gálvez, the Governor of Spanish Louisiana stormed and captured the small British frontier post on Bayou Manchac on 7 September 1779.

== War of 1812 ==
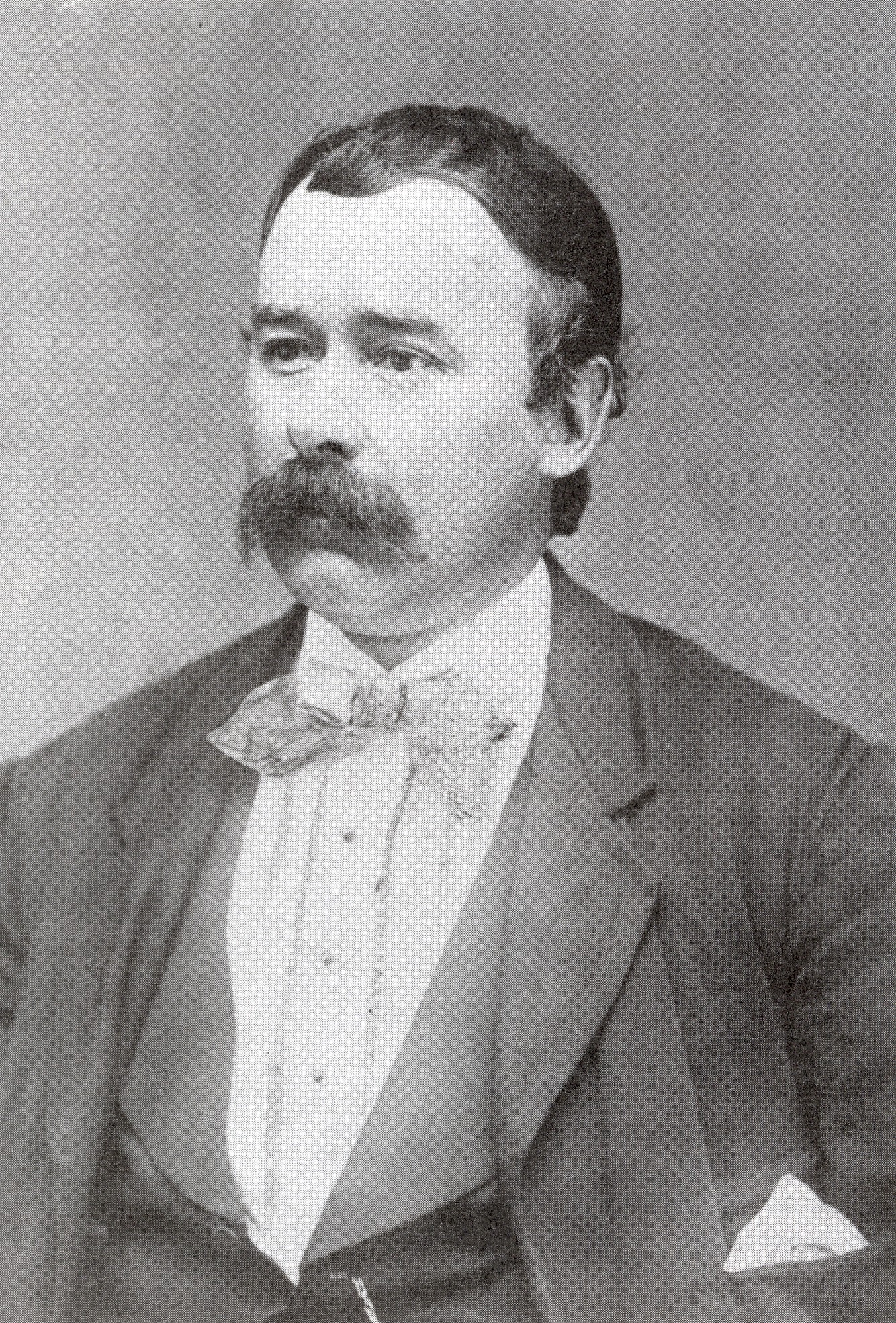
Lévite Thériault

Jean-Baptiste Hébert and Jean-Joseph Girouard served in the War of 1812. Lévite Thériault was the founder and lieutenant-colonel of the 1st Battalion of Madawaska militia in New Brunswick. Urbain Johnson was a captain of a militia in New Brunswick. Noël Hébert also served in a militia in Canada East. Henri M. Robicheau and Frederick A. Robicheau served as captains of local militias in Nova Scotia. Charles Cormier was a militia leader in Montreal.

== American Civil War ==
During the American Civil War, in Louisiana there were numerous Cajun militia units raised in the Army of the Confederacy. One unit was named "Independent Rangers of Iberville Squadron Militia Cavalry", after Pierre Le Moyne d'Iberville, founder of the French colony of Louisiana.

== World War I ==
During World War I, Acadians participated in the 165th Battalion (Acadiens), CEF, a unit in the Canadian Expeditionary Force. Based in Moncton, New Brunswick, the unit began recruiting in late 1915 throughout the Maritime provinces. After sailing to England in March 1917, the battalion was absorbed into the 13th Reserve Battalion on 7 April 1917.

== World War II ==
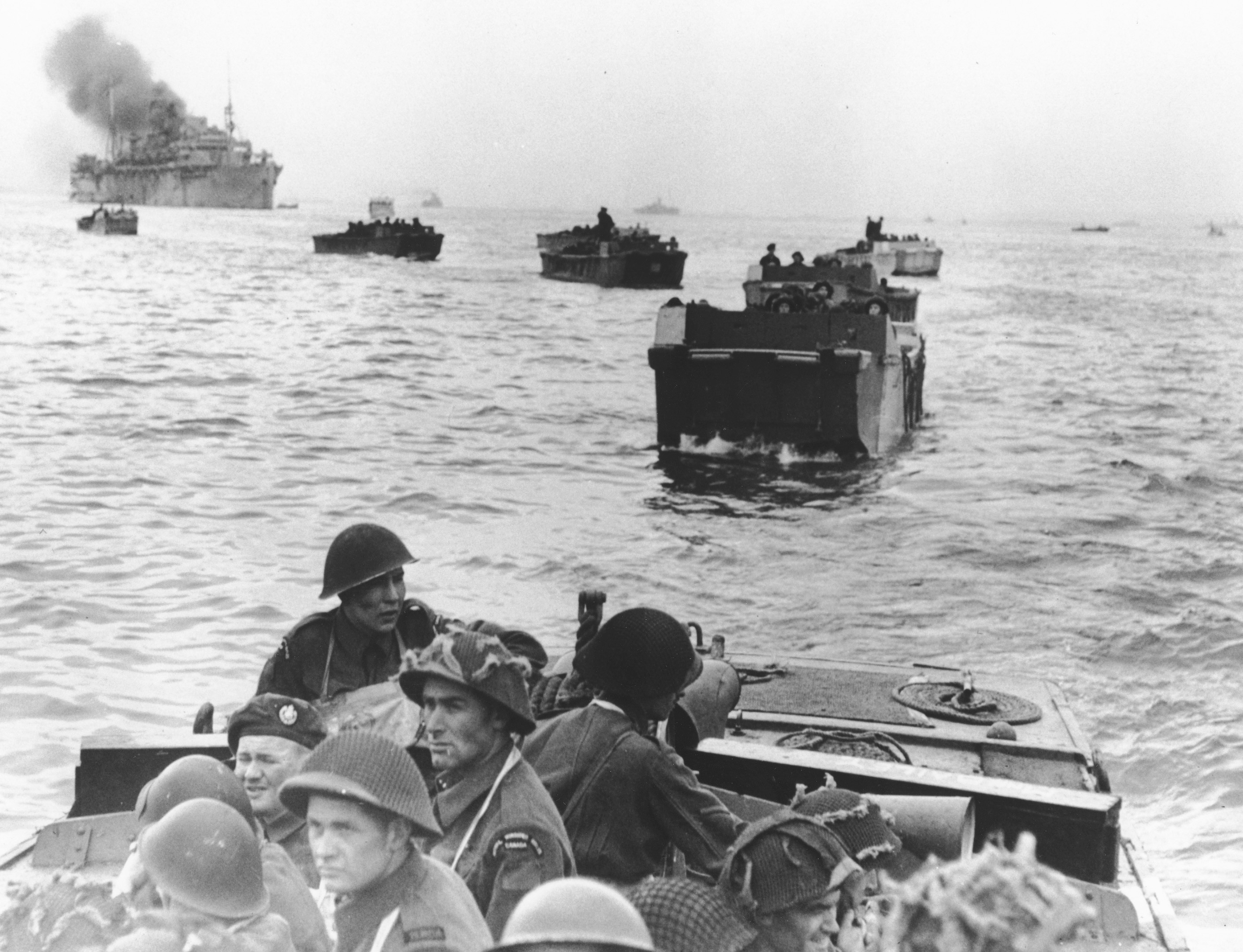
Canadian soldiers approaching Juno Beach aboard LCAs

During World War II, Acadian soldiers were instrumental in the Battle of Normandy and the liberation of Saint-Aubin-sur-Mer, Calvados, in which they are named by the Brèche des Acadiens. Saint-Aubin-sur-Mer is located at the eastern end of Nan Sector of Juno Beach, one of the landing sites on D-Day, at the beginning of the Battle of Normandy, during World War II.

On D-Day the infantry of the North Shore Regiment of New Brunswick landed there, and were backed up by the armour of the Fort Garry Horse (also known as the 10th Armoured Regiment). Le Régiment de la Chaudière of Quebec came ashore in reserve. About 100 defenders garrisoned the town and they were largely unaffected by the preparatory barrage. As such they were able to put up heavy resistance at the beach and in the town as the Canadians pushed inland, but were eventually overcome.

A commemorative plaque marks their involvement in the liberation of Carpiquet airport.

== Notable veterans ==
- Bernard Marres 'Marc' dit La Sonde – fought British at Canso, Nova Scotia (1718)
- Joseph Broussard
- Bernard-Anselme d'Abbadie de Saint-Castin
- Joseph d'Abbadie de Saint-Castin
- Paul Doucet (alias Paul Laurent) – pilot for French Navy during King George's War
- Charles Pelerain (Tuck) – pilot for French Navy during King George's War
- Joseph-Nicolas Gautier and his wife
- Charles Raymond
- Jacques Coste
- Louis Amand Bujold (Armand Bigeau)
- Joseph LeBlanc, dit Le Maigre
- Prudent Robichaud (leader of the mutiny on the Pembroke)
- Alexandre Bourg
- François Dupont Duvivier
- Pierre II Surette
- William Johnson (Guillaume Jeanson) (Battle of Bloody Creek (1757))
- John Bradstreet (fought for British)
- Joseph Winniett (supported the British, grandchild of Pierre Maisonnat dit Baptiste)
- Jean-Vincent d'Abbadie de Saint-Castin
- Pierre Maisonnat dit Baptiste
- Charles de Saint-Étienne de la Tour
- Joseph Godin dit Bellefontaine, Sieur de Beauséjour and Commander of the Acadian Militia of the St-John River valley (St. John River campaign)
- Joseph Trahan (Battle of the Plains of Abraham)
- Rene LeBlanc–- from Minas, worked for Villebon during King William's War
- Pierre Melanson – from Minas, worked for Villebon during King William's War, appointed "captain of the coast"
- Simon Thibodeau – American Revolution
- Lévite Thériault

== See also ==
- Military history of Nova Scotia
- 165th Battalion (Acadiens), CEF
- Military history of the Mi’kmaq
- Military history of the Maliseet people
- History of the Acadians
- English Invasion of Acadia (1654)
- Acadian Civil War

== Links ==
- Acadian Veterans – Veterans Affairs Canada
- Acadian Veterans of the First World War
- Acadians in the American Revolution
- Acadians veterans of the American Revolution
- Significantly Cajun Units in the Armies of the Confederacy
