= Joseph du Pont Duvivier =

Joseph Dupont Duvivier (12 November 1707 – 24 November 1760) was an Acadian-born military leader of the French.

== Life ==
Joseph Dupont Duvivier was born in Port Royal, Acadia, the second of the three surviving sons of François du Pont Duvivier and Marie Mius d'Entremont de Pobomcoup. His elder brother was François Dupont Duvivier.

Like his brothers, he entered the military service at Île Royale, but didn't take part in their business endeavours. He fought in King George's War and distinguished himself at the first Battle at Port-la-Joye (1745).

During the French and Indian War he was present at the Siege of Louisbourg (1758) and sent back to France after the capitulation. There, he and his brother Michel were awarded the cross of Saint-Louis in 1760. Later that year he became captain of one of the four companies sent to Canada under the command of François-Gabriel D'Angeac to aid the commander of the French fleet, François Chenard de La Giraudais. But this expedition was intercepted by the British navy on 3 July and defeated in the Battle of Restigouche. Joseph fought bravely until D’Angeac surrendered on 8 July. On the return voyage to France, he died of smallpox on 24 November 1760.

== Sources ==
- Crowley, T. A.; Pothier, Bernard (1979). "Du Pont Duvivier, Joseph". In Halpenny, Francess G (ed.). Dictionary of Canadian Biography. Vol. IV (1771–1800) (online ed.). University of Toronto Press.
