= Joseph Broussard =

Leader of the Acadian people in Acadia (1702–1765)

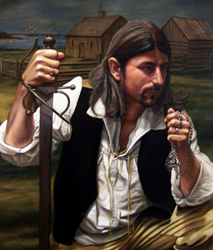
- Born: 1702; Port-Royal, Acadia, New France (present-day Annapolis Royal, Nova Scotia, Canada)
- Died: 1765 (aged 62–63); St. Martinville, Iberia Parish, Louisiana, New Spain (present-day Loreauville, Louisiana, U.S.)
- Burial place: Unknown location near Loreauville, Louisiana
- Military career
- Allegiance: Acadia
- Branch: Acadian militia
- Rank: Captain
- Nickname: Beausoleil
- Conflicts: Father Rale's War: Siege of Annapolis Royal (1724); King George's War: Battle of Grand Pre; Father Le Loutre's War: Battle at Chignecto; Raid on Dartmouth (1751); Raid on Lawrencetown (1754); French and Indian War: Battle of Beausejour; Battle of Bloody Creek (1757); Battle of Restigouche
- Other work: Led Acadians to Louisiana. Militia captain of the Acadians of the Atakapas

Joseph Broussard (1702–1765), also known as Beausoleil (English: Beautiful Sun), was a leader of the Acadian people in Acadia; later Nova Scotia, Prince Edward Island, and New Brunswick. Broussard organized Mi'kmaq and Acadian militias against the British through King George's War, Father Le Loutre's War and during the Seven Years' War. After Acadia was captured by the British, he eventually led the first group of Acadians to southern Louisiana in the present-day United States. His name is sometimes presented as Joseph Gaurhept Broussard; this is likely the result of a transcription error. Broussard is widely regarded as a hero and an important historical figure by both Acadians and Cajuns.

== Life ==
Broussard was born in Port-Royal, Acadia, in 1702 to Jean-François Broussard and Catherine Richard. His father came from Poitiers and his mother was born in Port Royal. He lived much of his life at Le Cran (present-day Stoney Creek, Albert County, New Brunswick), along the Petitcodiac River with his wife Agnes and their eleven children.

During Father Rale's War, Broussard participated in a raid on Annapolis Royal, Nova Scotia (1724).

=== King George's War ===
During King George's War, under the leadership of French priest Jean-Louis Le Loutre, Broussard began a resistance movement against British rule in Acadia. Broussard's forces frequently included Mi'kmaq militia, long-time allies of the Acadians. In 1747 he participated in and was later charged for his involvement with the Battle of Grand Pré.

=== Father Le Loutre's War ===
During Father Le Loutre's War, after the construction of Fort Beausejour in 1751, Broussard joined Jean-Louis Le Loutre at Beausejour. In an effort to stop the emigration of British settlers into Acadia, in 1749 Broussard was involved in one of the first raids on Dartmouth, Nova Scotia which resulted in the deaths of five British settlers. The following year, Broussard was in the Battle at Chignecto and then shortly afterward he led sixty Mi'kmaq and Acadians to attack Dartmouth again, in what would be known as the "Dartmouth Massacre" (1751). Broussard and the others killed twenty British settlers and took a few as prisoners. Cornwallis temporarily abandoned plans to settle Dartmouth.

In late April 1754, Beausoleil and a large band of Mi'kmaq and Acadians left Chignecto for Lawrencetown. They arrived in mid-May and in the night opened fire on the village. Beausoleil killed and scalped four British settlers and two soldiers. By August, as the raids continued, the residents and soldiers were withdrawn to Halifax.

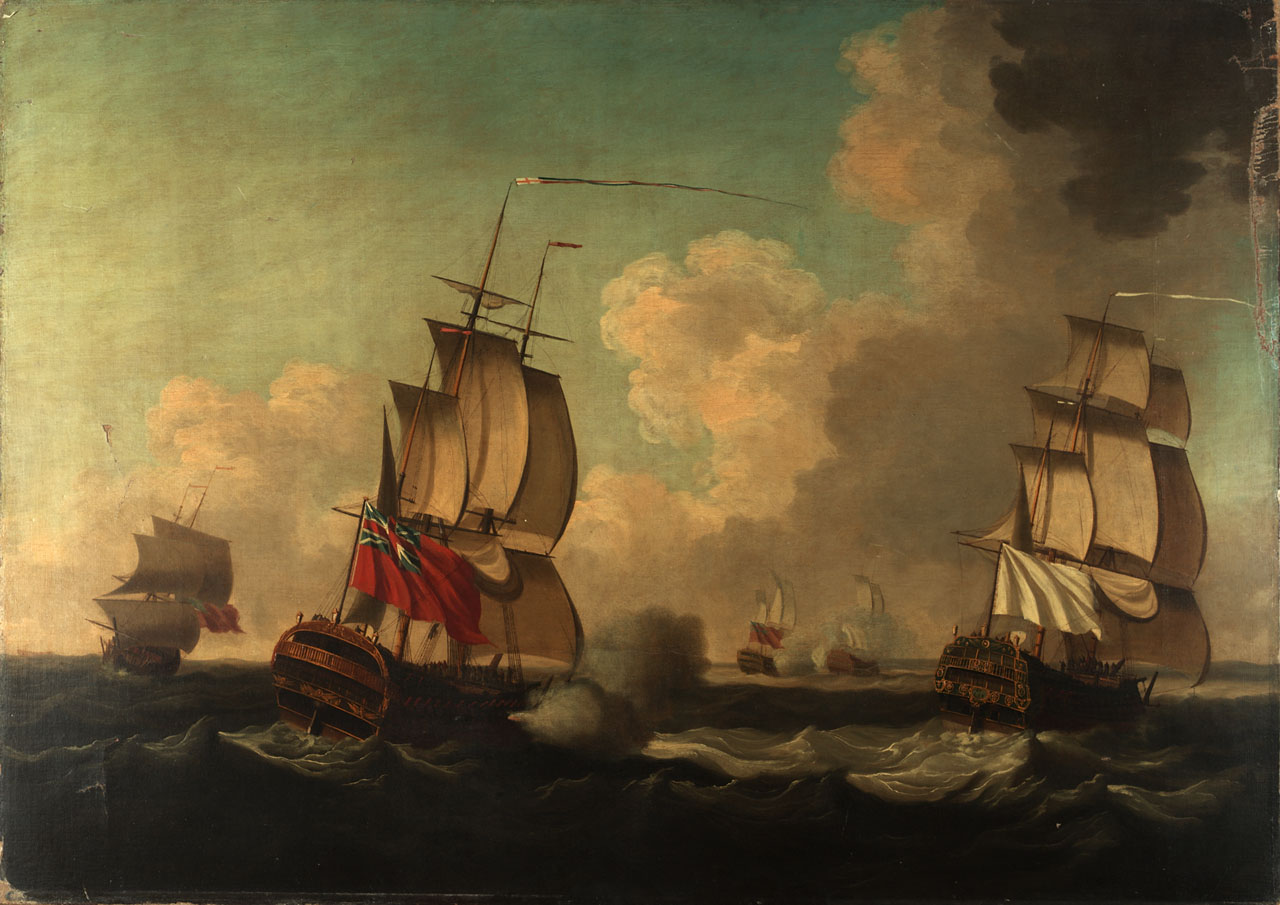
Capture of French ships Alcide and Lys off Newfoundland. The ships were carrying war supplies for Acadians and Mi'kmaq

In the action of 8 June 1755, a naval battle off Cape Race, Newfoundland, on board the French ships Alcide and Lys were found 10,000 scalping knives for Acadians and Indians serving under Chief Jean-Baptiste Cope and Acadian Beausoleil as they continue to fight Father Le Loutre's War.

Broussard was also active in the fight against Lieutenant Colonel Robert Monckton in the Battle of Beausejour.

=== Seven Years' War ===
With Le Loutre imprisoned after the Battle of Beausejour, Broussard became the leader of the Acadian resistance to the expulsion of the Acadians (1755–1764), leading assaults against the British on several occasions between 1755 and 1758 as part of the forces of Charles Deschamps de Boishébert et de Raffetot. After arming a ship in 1758, Broussard traveled through the upper Bay of Fundy region, where he attacked British settlements. His ship was seized in November 1758. He was then forced to flee, travelling first to the Miramichi and later imprisoned at Fort Edward in 1762. Finally, he was transferred and imprisoned with other Acadians in Halifax, Nova Scotia.

=== Arrival at Louisiana ===
Released in 1764, the year after the signing of the Treaty of Paris, Broussard left Nova Scotia, along with his family and hundreds of other Acadians, to Saint-Domingue (present-day Haiti). Unable to adapt to the climate and diseases that were killing Acadians, he led the group to settle in Louisiana.

He was among the first 200 Acadians to arrive in Louisiana on February 27, 1765, aboard the Santo Domingo. On April 8, 1765, he was appointed militia captain and commander of the "Acadians of the Atakapas" the area around present-day St. Martinville. Not long after his arrival, Joseph Broussard died near what is now St. Martinville at the age of 63. He died on September 18, 1765. Many of his descendants live in southern Louisiana. There are no known descendants living in Nova Scotia as of 2025.

== Descendancy ==
Broussard's children and grandchildren generally remained in Louisiana, integrating into the slave-owning upper classes of the colony. His 21st-century descendants include Celestine "Tina" Knowles, her two daughters Beyoncé and Solange, along with singer Tracie Spencer.

== Commemoration ==
In 2022, Joseph Broussard dit Beausoleil was designated as a National Historic Figure by the government of Canada and a commemorative plaque was installed in Moncton, New Brunswick.

== Modern cultural references ==
The Cajun music group BeauSoleil is named in honor of Broussard.

A New Brunswick group "Beausoleil Broussard" was very popular in the 1970s.

Broussard is a character in the novel Banished from Our Home: The Acadian Diary of Angelique Richard, Grand-Pre, Acadia, 1755 (2004) by Sharon Stewart.

A dramatized, historically inaccurate version of Beausoleil is featured in the Acadian novel Pélagie-la-Charrette, by Antonine Maillet.

Part of his militant Acadian hero story is told in the documentary feature "Zachary Richard, Cajun Heart" by Acadian director Phil Comeau.

== See also ==
- Military history of Nova Scotia
- Military history of the Acadians
