= Joseph-Nicolas Gautier =

Acadian merchant and leader (1689–1752)

- Born: September 26, 1689; Rochefort, France
- Died: April 10, 1752 (aged 62–63) present-day Prince Edward Island
- Military career
- Allegiance: France
- Branch: Acadian militia
- Conflicts: King George's War: Siege of Annapolis Royal (1744); Siege of Louisbourg (1745); Duc d'Anville Expedition; Father Le Loutre’s War: Acadian Exodus

Joseph-Nicolas Gautier dit Bellair (1689 – 1752) was one of the wealthiest Acadians as a merchant trader and a leader of the Acadian militia. He participated in war efforts against the British during King George's War and Father Le Loutre’s War. In the latter war, Gautier was particularly instrumental in the Acadian Exodus.

== See also ==
- Military history of Nova Scotia
