= Louis Du Pont Duchambon de Vergor =

French military officer

Louis Du Pont Duchambon de Vergor (September 20, 1713 – 1775) was a French military officer who served as Governor of Louisbourg (1744–1745) a member of the French Army during the Seven Years' War.

He was born in the Charente department of France, as the second son of Louis Du Pont Duchambon and Jeanne Mius d’Entremont de Pobomcoup, making him Acadian on his mother's side. Vergor began his military career as a cadet in the Compagnies Franches de la Marine and served in various North American locations, mostly in what would later be the Maritime Provinces of Canada. An injury suffered in 1745 during the siege of Louisbourg resulted in his being sent to France for several years, along with nearly all the other French people on Cape Breton Island. He returned to Louisbourg after the peace settlement in 1748, and reached the rank of Captain in 1750.

During Father Le Loutre's War, de Vergor was engaged in the Battle off Port La Tour (1750) in Nova Scotia.

In 1754, Vergor was named as commander of Fort Beauséjour in what would become New Brunswick. With the Seven Years' War underway, French forts in the maritime regions were targeted by British troops, and on June 4, 1755, Fort Beauséjour was attacked by a force led by Robert Monckton. The siege lasted two weeks, with Vergor holding out against the greater British force. However, not having taken the necessary precautions to organise a good defense, Vergor was not capable of meeting the British head on. He had under his orders 160 soldiers, 300 Acadian refugees, and a group of Mi'mkaq. After a few days of siege, a cannon ball exploded inside the fort, killing six officers and several soldiers. Vigor panicked, and raised the white flag. The British gave him favorable conditions, and gave permission to him and his men to go to Louisbourg. The Acadians joined their relatives in northeastern Acadia, now (New Brunswick). Vergor was tried by court-martial at Quebec City in September 1757 and acquitted of charges that the forts were not adequately defended.

Two years later, Vergor was a part of the defense of Quebec under Louis-Joseph de Montcalm during the siege prior to the Battle of the Plains of Abraham. On the night of September 12, 1759, Vergor was in command of a small encampment tasked to guard the upper portion of a road leading from the St. Lawrence River to the plains; his command was the first to contact the British under General James Wolfe. Ironically, the British officer in charge of the initial assault force was again Robert Monckton. The French encampment was caught by surprise, and Vergor was shot and captured.

After repatriation to France, Vergor was apparently unable to continue in the military, and apparently died in poverty some time after 1775.

Political offices
Preceded by Jean-Baptiste Prévost du Quesnel	Governor of Île-Royale; 1744-1745	Succeeded by Antoine Le Moyne de Châteauguay
