= François du Pont Duvivier =

François du Pont Duvivier was born September 5, 1676, at Sérignac, province of Saintonge, France. He became ensign, and navy captain in Acadia and Île-Royale (present-day Cape Breton Island). He died in Louisbourg on November 1, 1714.

Duvivier was second of ten children. His parents Hugues Du Pont and Marie Hérauld, of Gourville. Two of his brothers, Michel Du Pont de Renon and Louis Du Pont Duchambon, also served in Acadia and Ile Royale. On January 12, 1705, Duvivier married Marie Mius d’Entremont.

He served in the garrison at Port Royal, the capital of Acadia, during Queen Anne's War, including during the successful defenses of 1707 and the fall of Port Royal in 1710.

They had seven children: François, Joseph-Michel, Joseph, Louis and Michel, all born at Port Royal, and Anne-Marie, born at Sérignac, and Marie-Joseph, born in Louisbourg in 1715, after the death of her father.
