= Acadian Exodus =

Flight and Relocation of Acadians during Father Le Loutre's War

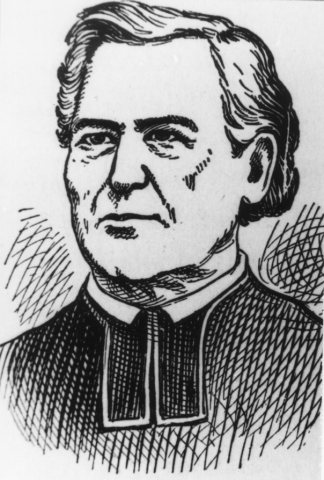
Father Jean-Louis Le Loutre

The Acadian Exodus (also known as the Acadian migration) happened during Father Le Loutre's War (1749–1755) and involved almost half of the total Acadian population of Nova Scotia deciding to relocate to French controlled territories. (Note: Patterson (1994), p. 132, states the exodus involved one-third of the Acadians.) The three primary destinations were: the west side of the Mesagoueche River in the Chignecto region (near the modern New Brunswick-Nova Scotia border), Isle Saint-Jean (now Prince Edward Island) and Île-Royale (now Cape Breton Island). The leader of the Exodus was Father Jean-Louis Le Loutre, whom the British gave the code name "Moses".

Le Loutre acted in conjunction with Governor of New France, Roland-Michel Barrin de La Galissonière, who encouraged the Acadian migration. A prominent Acadian who transported Acadians to Ile St. Jean and Ile Royal was Joseph-Nicolas Gautier. The overall upheaval of the early 1750s in Nova Scotia was unprecedented. Atlantic Canada witnessed more population movements, more fortification construction, and more troop allocations than ever before in the region. The greatest immigration of the Acadians between 1749 and 1755 took place in 1750. Primarily due to natural disasters and British raids, the Exodus proved to be unsustainable when Acadians tried to develop communities in the French territories.

== Historical context ==
Despite the British conquest of Acadia in 1710, Acadia was dominated by Acadians and Mi'kmaq. For over forty-five years the Acadians refused to sign an unconditional oath of allegiance to Britain. During this time period Acadians both threatened to leave Acadia and were threatened with expulsion at various times. (The first deportation of the Acadians happened when they were expelled from present day Cape Breton after the Siege of Louisbourg (1745).) Acadians left peninsular Nova Scotia to protest Edward Cornwallis' demand that they take an unconditional oath.

The Acadian Exodus began in 1749 primarily because the Acadians were resisting the British firmly taking control of peninsular Nova Scotia through establishing Halifax and, within eighteen months, building fortifications in the major Acadian communities: present-day Windsor (Fort Edward); Grand-Pré (Fort Vieux Logis) and Chignecto (Fort Lawrence). (Of course, a British fort already existed at the other major Acadian centre of Annapolis Royal, Nova Scotia. Cobequid remained without a fort.) The British also established forts at the various Protestant communities they were establishing in Nova Scotia: Halifax, Bedford, Lawrencetown, Lunenburg, and Dartmouth.

Along with the desire of many Acadians to leave peninsular Nova Scotia in protest, withdrawing the Acadians to French-held territory was also the official French policy after 1748. The French were invested in having Acadians migrate to the Chignecto region, in part, to protect the only land route between Louisbourg and Quebec. The land route went through Chignecto, along the Bay of Fundy and up the Saint John River. This route is also the pathway many Acadians took to leave the Bay of Fundy to go to Baie Verte and onward to Île St. Jean (Prince Edward Island) or Île Royale (Cape Breton Island). To protect this vital gateway, at the beginning of 1749, La Galissoniere strategically constructed three forts within 18 months along the route: one at Baie Vert (Fort Gaspareaux), one at Chignecto (Fort Beausejour) and another at the mouth of the Saint John River (Fort Menagoueche). When La Jonquiere reached Quebec, he instructed Le Loutre and the Mi'kmaq to support the migration of Acadians to Chignecto, which would protect the corridor between Quebec City and Louisbourg. Acadia would revive with an instant population while the British would be deprived of hard-working and productive farmers. The French policy promised Acadians the means and support to relocate to French territories. On some occasions, in conjunction with the French policy, Le Loutre and the Mi'kmaq had to force some reluctant Acadians to join the exodus. (Note: Some Acadians were forced to leave mainland Nova Scotia by the French Crown and their aboriginal allies. Acadians refusing to leave mainland Nova Scotia were threatened with violence. In January 1750, aboriginal forces forbid Cobequid Acadians "... to pass [to the west of] the River Chebenacadi upon pain of Death." Acadians were told that if they refused to migrate "... their homes would be plundered and their wives and children carried off and even massacred before their very eyes." The French governor of Île St. Jean, having received hundreds of Acadians from 1749 to 1752, noted the Cobequid Acadians "leave their homes with great regret and they began to move their luggage only when the savages compelled them." Similarly, on 30 April 1750, Cornwallis wrote to the Lords of Trade stating, "The inhabitants of ... Cobequid are retiring from the Province, being threatened with a general massacre by La Corne [the top military leader for the French in Acadia] and Loutre". (See Scott & Scott (2008), p. 59; Also Griffiths (2005), p. 393).)

== The Exodus ==
With demands for an unconditional oath, the British fortification of Nova Scotia, and the support of French policy, a significant number of Acadians made a stand against the British. On 18 September 1749, a document was delivered to Edward Cornwallis signed by 1000 Acadians from all the major centres. The document stated that they would leave the country before they would sign an unconditional oath. Cornwallis continued to press for the unconditional oath with a deadline of 25 October. In response, hundreds of Acadians began the exodus from Nova Scotia. In fact some Acadians had begun to leave prior to hearing Cornwallis response. Among the first to depart was a group of about 100 from the Chebucto region. They went to Baie des Espagnoles on Île Royal (Sydney, Cape Breton). Groups from both Beaubassin and Annapolis Royal also requested Governor-General La Jonquiere at Quebec to support them in leaving for the St. Lawrence River.

By the end of 1749 several hundred Acadians had made their way to Baie Verte, where they went over to Île Saint-Jean. The French made considerable efforts to transport refugees to Île Saint-Jean and by early October six or seven hundred had arrived there. Most of the 1,000 Acadians at Cobequid vacated their lands, along with a very large part of Pisiquid, several hundred, went to Île Saint-Jean. By 1752, the number of Acadians on Île Saint-Jean was 2,223, double the amount in two years. On one occasion en route to Île Saint-Jean, a British naval patrol intercepted Acadians in a vessel and an Acadian passenger declared "they chose rather to quit their lands and estates than possess them upon the terms propos'd by the English governor."

Acadians migrated from the east to the west side of the Missaguash river during the Battle of Chignecto (1750). The Acadian village of Beaubassin was burned to prevent Lawrence from establishing a fort in the major Acadian village. More than 2,000 moved to Chignecto and the Shepody Basin area.

Under the direction of Le Loutre, Mi'kmaq and Acadians supported the Exodus by raiding the new British fortifications in the Acadian centres and the new Protestant settlements. During this period, Mi'kmaq and Acadians attacked Fort Vieux Logis, they made numerous attacks on Dartmouth, numerous attacks on peninsular Halifax, and engaged in various conflicts at Fort Lawrence (Chignecto). There was also a rebellion against the British by the Foreign Protestants in Lunenburg, Nova Scotia, which was likely supported by Le Loutre. (Note: Faragher (2005), pp. 275, 280, states that Lawrence had concluded that there was French involvement, which seems likely given the number of Foreign Protestants who joined the Exodus.) (See Father Le Loutre's War). To guard against attacks on the new Protestant settlements, British fortifications were immediately erected in Halifax, Dartmouth, Lawrencetown, Bedford, and Lunenburg.

The Crown tried to prevent the Acadian exodus. Cornwallis ordered, for example, Captain John Handfield and two companies of troops to Fort Vieux Logis in Grand-Pré with instructions to patrol the roads to prevent Acadians from leaving. Patrols also happened throughout the Cobequid. (On one such patrol, Noel Doiron's priest Jacques Girard was arrested. This action precipitated Doiron leaving Noel, Nova Scotia for Point Prime, Île Saint-Jean in the spring of 1750.) The British eventually forbade all assemblies of the Acadians, and they were ordered to supply the British commanders with provisions and offer their labor on demand, at prices set by regulation. Not surprisingly, many Acadians refused to supply the British, and by the summer of 1750 Acadians by the hundreds were in flight from the province.

== Consequence ==
The Acadian migration to Chignecto helped to protect the corridor between Quebec and Louisbourg. During the winter of 1749–1750, Louis La Corne was dispatched from Quebec and arrived at the settlements near the Isthmus of Chignecto, along the rivers Petitcodiac, Chipoudie, and Memramcook. La Corne asked the Acadians to affirm their allegiance to the French king, which they did. Some men, perhaps most joined the militia companies. By early 1751, over 250 Acadians had joined the French militia. These Acadians and Mi'kmaq fought in the attempts to prevent Fort Lawrence from being built (1750) and eventually served in the defence of Fort Beausejour (1755).

In October 1752, Governor Hobson did not send Protestant settlers to live among the Acadians for fear that more of them would join the exodus. The conditions of the refugees who fled to Chignecto and to Île Saint-Jean were very difficult. While the condition of those who went to Île Royale prior to the Expulsion of 1758 is not well documented. Those that made it to Île Saint-Jean also suffered from numerous natural disasters. There were a series of plagues that struck the island. In 1749, swarms of black field mice destroyed that year's crop. A plague of locusts followed the year. And the year after that a blistering drought.

The 1,500 who went to Chignecto suffered from overcrowding. They survived on rations waiting for the dykes to be built. Acadians from Minas were a constant support in providing provisions and labour on the dykes. In retaliation for the Acadian and Mi'kmaq raid on Dartmouth, the British sent several armed companies to Chignecto, who killed a few French defenders and breached the dykes. Hundreds of acres of crops were ruined, which proved disastrous for the Acadians and the French troops. Acadians began to defect from the Exodus and made an application to return to the British colony. As a result of the conditions of the Acadian refugees, in 1753–1754, Le Loutre temporarily stopped pressing Acadians at Minas to evacuate to his new settlements. Instead, he encouraged them to grow more grain, which they did in record quantities sufficient to support the large French, Acadian, and Mi'kmaq population otherwise occupied in the service of France.

Le Loutre immediately sought help from Quebec and then France to support re-building dykes in the area. He returned with success in 1753 and work began on the grand dyking project on riviere Au Lac (present day Aulac River, New Brunswick). Unfortunately, the following year storm tides broke through the main cross-dike of the large-scale reclamation project, destroying nearly everything the Acadians had accomplished in several months of intense work. Again, some Acadians tried to defect to the British.

The Acadians, Mi'kmaq, and the French were defeated at the Battle of Beausejour. (Le Loutre was captured and imprisoned by the British until the end of the war.) After the fall of Beausejour, the British began expelling the Acadians with the Bay of Fundy campaign. The Acadian Exodus spared most of the Acadians who joined it – particularly those who lived in Île Saint-Jean and Île Royal – from the expulsions during the Bay of Fundy campaign. Despite the hardships they faced, most Acadian refugees had some validation of their choice to leave Nova Scotia once the deportation began. With the fall of Louisbourg in 1758, the Acadians who left for the French colonies were deported as well.

== Historiography ==
Historian Stephen Patterson compared the Acadian Exodus to retreating Russians who carried out a scorched earth policy during the French invasion of Russia in 1812, and compared the expulsions of the Acadians to Sherman's March to the Sea across Georgia in 1864 during the American Civil War.

== See also ==
- Military history of Nova Scotia
- Military history of the Acadians

== Bibliography ==
- Akins, Thomas Beamish, ed. (1869). Selections from the Public Documents of the Province of Nova Scotia: Pub. Under a Resolution of the House of Assembly Passed March 15, 1865. Halifax: Charles Annand.
- Faragher, John Mack (2005). A Great and Noble Scheme: The Tragic Story of the Expulsion of the French Acadians from Their American Homeland. W.W Norton & Company. ISBN 978-0-393-05135-3.
- Grenier, John (2008). The Far Reaches of Empire: War in Nova Scotia, 1710-1760. University of Oklahoma Press. ISBN 978-0-8061-3876-3.
- Griffiths, N.E.S. (2005). From Migrant to Acadian: A North American Border People, 1604-1755. McGill-Queen's University Press. ISBN 978-0-7735-2699-0.
- Johnston, A.J.B. (2005). "French Attitudes Toward the Acadians, ca. 1680-1756". In Ronnie Gilles LeBlanc (ed.). Du Grand Dérangement à la Déportation: nouvelles perspectives historiques. Université de Moncton. pp. 131–166. ISBN 978-1-897214-02-2.
- Landry, Peter (2007). The Lion and the Lily. Trafford. ISBN 978-1-4251-5450-9.
- Murdoch, Beamish (1866). A History of Nova-Scotia, Or Acadie. Vol. II. Halifax: J. Barnes.
- Patterson, Stephen E. (1994). "1744–1763: Colonial Wars and Aboriginal Peoples". In Phillip Buckner; John G. Reid (eds.). The Atlantic Region to Confederation: A History. University of Toronto Press. pp. 125–155. ISBN 978-1-4875-1676-5.
- Salusbury, John (2011). Ronald Rompkey (ed.). Expeditions of Honour: The Journal of John Salusbury in Halifax, Nova Scotia, 1749-53. Mcgill-Queen's University Press. ISBN 978-0-7735-9089-2.
- Scott, Shawn; Scott, Tod (2008). "Noel Doiron and the East Hants Acadians". Royal Nova Scotia Historical Society. 11. Archived from the original on 2 July 2011.

== Primary sources ==
- London Magazine, 1750, p. 371
- Brodhead, John Romeyn (1858). Documents Relative to the Colonial History of the State of New York. Vol. 10. Albany: Weed, Parsons and Co. p. 299.
