= Louis Du Pont Duchambon =

French military officer

Louis Du Pont Duchambon (Chalais, Charente January 1, 1680 – 1775?) was a French military officer who served as a member of the French Army during the King George's War.

Louis Du Pont Duchambon arrived in Acadia in 1702 as an ensign in a new company in which his brothers, François du Pont Duvivier and Michel Du Pont de Renon, served as captain and lieutenant. Although an unexceptional officer, Duchambon gained promotions through seniority and his friendship with Governor Saint-Ovide.

Duchambon was appointment in April 1744 to replace François Le Coutre de Bourville as King's lieutenant of Île Royale. In October he became Governor of the colony when Commandant Jean-Baptiste-Louis Le Prévost Duquesnel suddenly died.

He was faced with the Siege of Louisbourg (1745) by the English and was forced to capitulate after 47 days. He arrived in France four weeks later and was trialed, but acquitted.

In March 1746 Duchambon retired and spent his later years at Chalais in his native Saintonge, where he lived off his pension and a small income from property.

He had married in 1709 with Jeanne Mius d’Entremont de Pobomcoup and had at least 7 sons, including

- Louis Du Pont Duchambon de Vergor (1713–1775)
