= François Dupont Duvivier =

Francois Duvivier
- Born: 25 April 1705; Port-Royal, France
- Died: 28 May 1776 (aged 71)
- Military career
- Allegiance: France
- Service years: 1730-1747
- Conflicts: War of the Austrian Succession Raid on Canso 1st Siege of Annapolis Royal

Captain François Dupont Duvivier (French pronunciation: [fʁɑ̃swa dypɔ̃ dyvivje]; 25 April 1705 – 28 May 1776) was an Acadian-born merchant and officer of the French colonial troupes de la marine. He was the wealthiest offer on Ile Royale and led the Raid on Canso and Siege of Annapolis Royal (1744) during King George's War. He received the Order of Saint Louis for his military work in Acadia.

== Early life ==
François Dupont Duvivier was born in Port Royal, Acadia, the eldest of the three sons of François du Pont Duvivier and Marie Mius d'Entremont de Pobomkou. With the cession in 1713 of Acadia to the British the Duviviers were sent to the new colony of Île Royale (present-day Cape Breton Island) where, through various business endeavours they became one of the wealthiest and most prestigious families. François upheld his family's strong military traditions, enlisting as a cadet in the French troupes de la marine in 1716, and being commissioned an ensign three years later. By 1730, he had earned promotion to lieutenant and in 1737 he was made Captain in the Compagnies Franches garrison of Louisbourg.

== Business ventures ==
Duvivier proved himself an astute businessman in Louisbourg, rapidly accruing a vast fortune and becoming one of the wealthiest officers in the colony. Through a series of trading ventures with New England, the West Indies, and France, canny manipulation of the law, and the usage of his military rank as leverage he earned a reputation as a businessman of great acumen who was not afraid to use unscrupulous business practices to further his own ambitions. By 1745, his fortune was estimated by a contemporary at the vast sum of 200,000 livres.

== King George's War ==
At the outbreak of the hostilities between France and Great Britain whose North American theatre became known among Americans as King George's War (but is known more generally as the War of the Austrian Succession), Duvivier was chosen to command a raiding party of 350 men in an attack on the British settlement at Canso. After the success of this raid, the captain was charged with the task of raising an Acadian and Mi'kmaq army to capture Annapolis Royal (as Port Royal had been renamed), the only significant British stronghold in Nova Scotia. Having achieved less than expected success in gathering these forces, Duvivier arrived at Annapolis Royal with an army that was inadequate to the task of forcing a surrender. After laying siege to the settlement for nearly a month, he received word that reinforcements and naval support from Louisbourg would not arrive, forcing him to break siege and return to Île Royale.

== Later life ==
After the expedition to Annapolis Royal, Duvivier returned to France where he carried the colony's dispatches to Versailles and prepared to join a relief expedition to Louisbourg. However, the fall of Louisbourg to British colonists under the command of William Pepperrell halted all plans for a relief expedition, compelling Duvivier to stay in France. In 1747, he resigned his captain's commission only to rejoin at half pay in 1749 in order to make a bid for the governorship of Île Royale, newly restored to the French in the Treaty of Aix-la-Chapelle. Failing in this he remained in France, retiring from the military in 1753 with a pension of 1,200 livres. Records of Duvivier disappear for the next twenty years, but it can be presumed that he spent most of this time living on his estate at Le Vivier, near Chalais in the commune of Sérignac before dying on 28 May 1776. The vast fortune he had accumulated in North America had dwindled to 25,000 livres, which was inherited by his sister-in-law.
