= King George's War =

Military operations in North America

- Part of the War of the Austrian Succession and the American Indian Wars
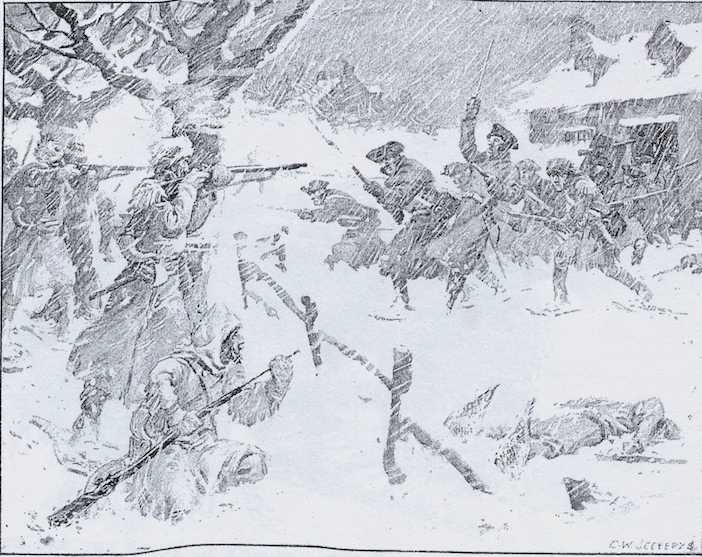
- French and Mi'kmaq Battle of Grand Pré, February 1747
Date	3 May 1744 –18 October 1748
Location	New England; New York; Nova Scotia
Result	Treaty of Aix-la-Chapelle; Status quo ante bellum

Belligerents
France; New France; Wabanaki Confederacy	Great Britain; New England Colonies; New York; Nova Scotia; Iroquois Confederacy

Commanders and leaders
Father Jean-Louis Le Loutre; Father Pierre Maillard (Kingdom of France) Louis Du Pont Duchambon (Kingdom of France) Pierre Morpain (Kingdom of France) Daniel Liénard de Beaujeu	William Pepperrell (Kingdom of Great Britain) Peter Warren

King George's War (1744–1748) encompassed the military operations in North America that formed part of the War of the Austrian Succession (1740–1748). It was the third of the four French and Indian Wars. It took place primarily in the British provinces of New York, Massachusetts Bay (which included Maine as well as Massachusetts at the time), New Hampshire (which included Vermont at the time), and Nova Scotia. Its most significant action was an expedition organized by Massachusetts Governor William Shirley that besieged and ultimately captured the French fortress of Louisbourg, on Cape Breton Island in Nova Scotia, in 1745. In French, it is known as the Troisième Guerre Intercoloniale or Third Intercolonial War.

The Treaty of Aix-la-Chapelle ended the war in 1748 and restored Louisbourg to France, but failed to resolve any outstanding territorial issues.

== Causes ==
The War of Jenkins' Ear (named for a 1731 incident in which a Spanish commander sliced off the ear of British merchant captain Robert Jenkins and told him to take it to his king, George II) broke out in 1739 between Spain and Great Britain, but was limited to the Caribbean Sea and conflict between Spanish Florida and the neighboring British Province of Georgia. The War of the Austrian Succession, nominally a struggle over the legitimacy of the accession of Maria Theresa to the Austrian throne, began in 1740, but at first did not involve either Britain or Spain militarily. Britain was drawn diplomatically into that conflict in 1742 as an ally of Austria and an opponent of France and Prussia, but open hostilities between them did not take place until 1743 at Dettingen.

War was not formally declared between Britain and France until March 1744. Massachusetts did not declare war against Canada and France until June 2.

== Course of the war ==
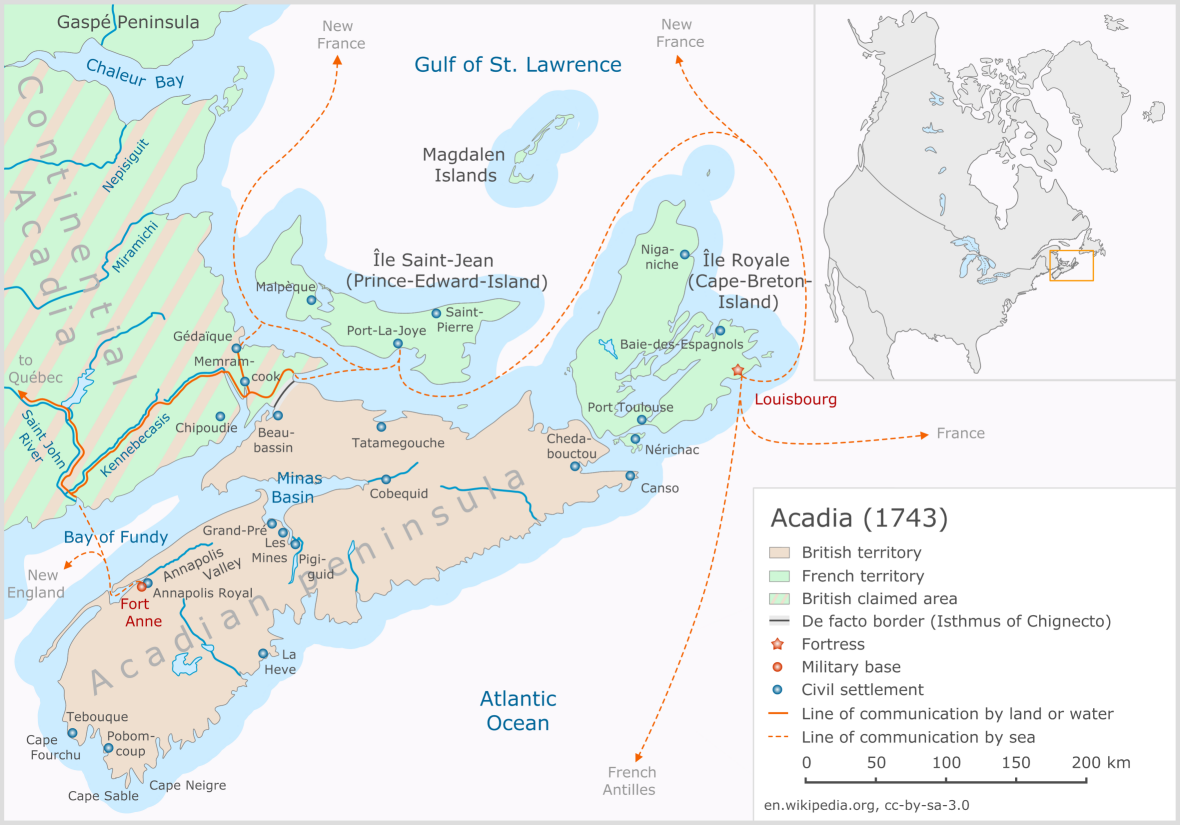
Acadia in 1743, the year before King George's War had begun. Major battles of the war are marked on the map.

News of war declarations reached the French fortress at Louisbourg first, on May 3, 1744, and the forces there wasted little time in beginning hostilities. Concerned about their overland supply lines to Quebec, they raided the British fishing port of Canso on May 23, and then organized an attack on Annapolis Royal, the capital of Nova Scotia. But French forces were delayed in departing Louisbourg, and their Mi'kmaq and Maliseet First Nations allies, together with Father Jean-Louis Le Loutre, decided to attack on their own at Fort Anne in early July.

Annapolis had received news of the war declaration, and the British forces were somewhat prepared when the First Nations warriors began besieging Fort Anne. Lacking heavy weapons, the Mi'kmaq and Maliseet withdrew after a few days. Then, in mid-August, a larger French force arrived at Fort Anne, but it was also unable to mount an effective attack or siege against the garrison. The fort had received supplies and reinforcements from Massachusetts.

In 1745, British colonial forces captured Fortress Louisbourg after a siege of six weeks. In retaliation, the Wabanaki Confederacy of Acadia launched the Northeast Coast Campaign (1745) against the British settlements on the border of Acadia in northeast Maine. France launched a major expedition to recover Louisbourg in 1746. Beset by storms, disease, and finally the death of its commander, the Duc d'Anville, the expedition's survivors returned to France in tatters without reaching its objective.

Colored engraving depicting the Siege of Louisbourg Following a 47-day siege, British forces captured the Fortress of Louisbourg in July 1745.

The war was also fought on the frontiers between the northern British colonies and New France. Each side had allies among the Native Americans, and outlying villages were raided and captives taken for ransom, or sometimes adoption by Native American tribes who had suffered losses to disease or warfare. As a result of the frequent raiding on the northern frontier, Governor William Shirley ordered the construction of a chain of frontier outposts stretching west to its border with New York.

On November 28, 1745, the French with their Indian allies raided and destroyed the village of Saratoga, New York, killing or capturing more than one hundred of its inhabitants. After this, the British abandoned their settlements in New York north of Albany, a major trading city. In July 1746 an Iroquois and intercolonial force assembled in northern New York for a retaliatory attack against British forces.

When the expected British regulars never arrived, the attack was called off. A large (1,000+ man) French and First Nations force mustered to raid in the upper Hudson River valley in 1746 instead raided in the Hoosac River valley, including an attack on Fort Massachusetts (at present-day North Adams, Massachusetts). This was in retaliation for the slaying of an Indian leader in an earlier skirmish. Other raids included the 1747 French and Mi'kmaq raid on Grand Pré, Nova Scotia; and a raid in 1748 by Indian allies of the French against Schenectady, New York.

== Aftermath ==
The founding of Halifax, Nova Scotia in 1749. Fighting in Nova Scotia between the British, and the Acadian and Mi'kmaq militias continued even after the signing of the peace treaty.

The war took a heavy toll, especially in the northern British colonies. The losses of Massachusetts men alone in 1745–46 have been estimated as 8% of that colony's adult male population.

According to the Treaty of Aix-la-Chapelle, Louisbourg was returned to France three years later, in exchange for the city of Madras in India, which had been captured by the French from the British. This decision outraged New Englanders, particularly Massachusetts colonists who had contributed the most to the expedition (in terms of funding and personnel). The British government eventually acknowledged Massachusetts' effort with a payment of £180,000 after the war. The province used this money to retire its devalued paper currency.

The peace treaty, which restored all colonial borders to their pre-war status, did little to end the lingering enmity between France, Britain, and their respective colonies, nor did it resolve any territorial disputes. Tensions remained in both North America and Europe. They broke out again in 1754, with the start of the French and Indian War in North America, which spread to Europe two years later as the Seven Years' War. Between 1749 and 1755 in Acadia and Nova Scotia, the fighting continued in Father Le Loutre's War.

== See also ==
- American Indian Wars
- Colonial American military history
- Military history of Canada
- Military history of the Mi'kmaq people
- Military history of Nova Scotia
- Military history of the Acadians
- Military of New France
