= Petitcodiac River campaign =

British military operations

- Part of the expulsion of the Acadians
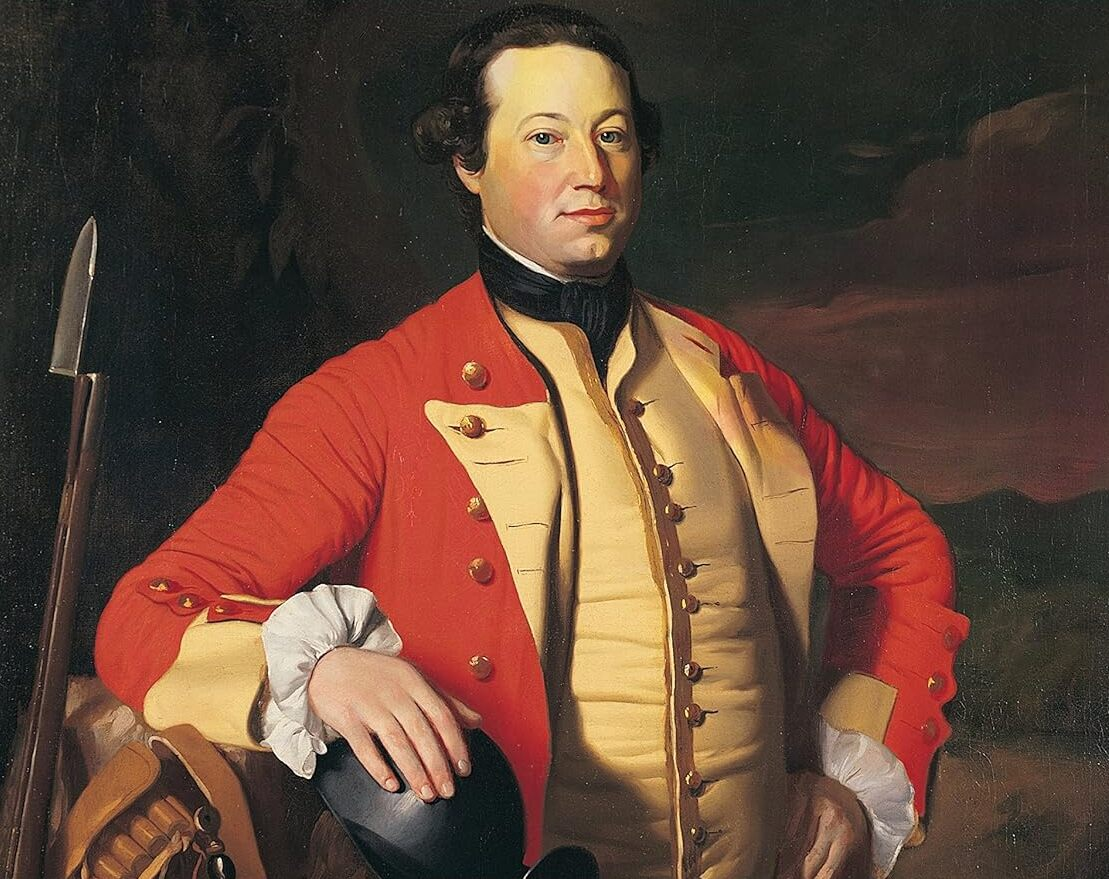
- George Scott by John Singleton Copley (c.1758), The Brook
Date	June 1758 – November 1758
Location	Petitcodiac River, present-day New Brunswick
Result	British victory

Commanders and leaders
George Scott; Joseph Gorham; Moses Hazen; Benoni Danks; Silvanus Cobb; William Stark	Joseph Broussard; Charles Deschamps de Boishébert et de Raffetot; Charles Germain

Units involved
40th Regiment of Foot; Gorham's Rangers; Danks' Rangers; Roger's Rangers	Acadia militia; Wabanaki Confederacy (Maliseet militia and Mi'kmaq militia)

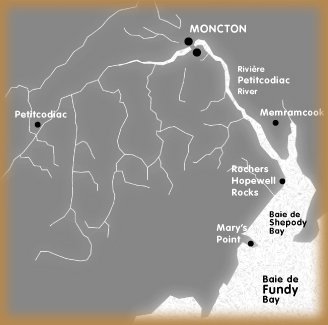
Petitcodiac River, New Brunswick

The Petitcodiac River campaign was a series of British military operations from June to November 1758, during the French and Indian War (the North American theatre of the Seven Years' War), to deport the Acadians that either lived along the Petitcodiac River or had taken refuge there from earlier deportation operations, such as the Ile Saint-Jean campaign. Under the command of George Scott, William Stark's company of Rogers Rangers, Benoni Danks and Gorham's Rangers carried out the operation, which was carried out in conjunction with campaigns in Cape Sable, the Gulf of St. Lawrence, and the St. John River.

== Historical context ==
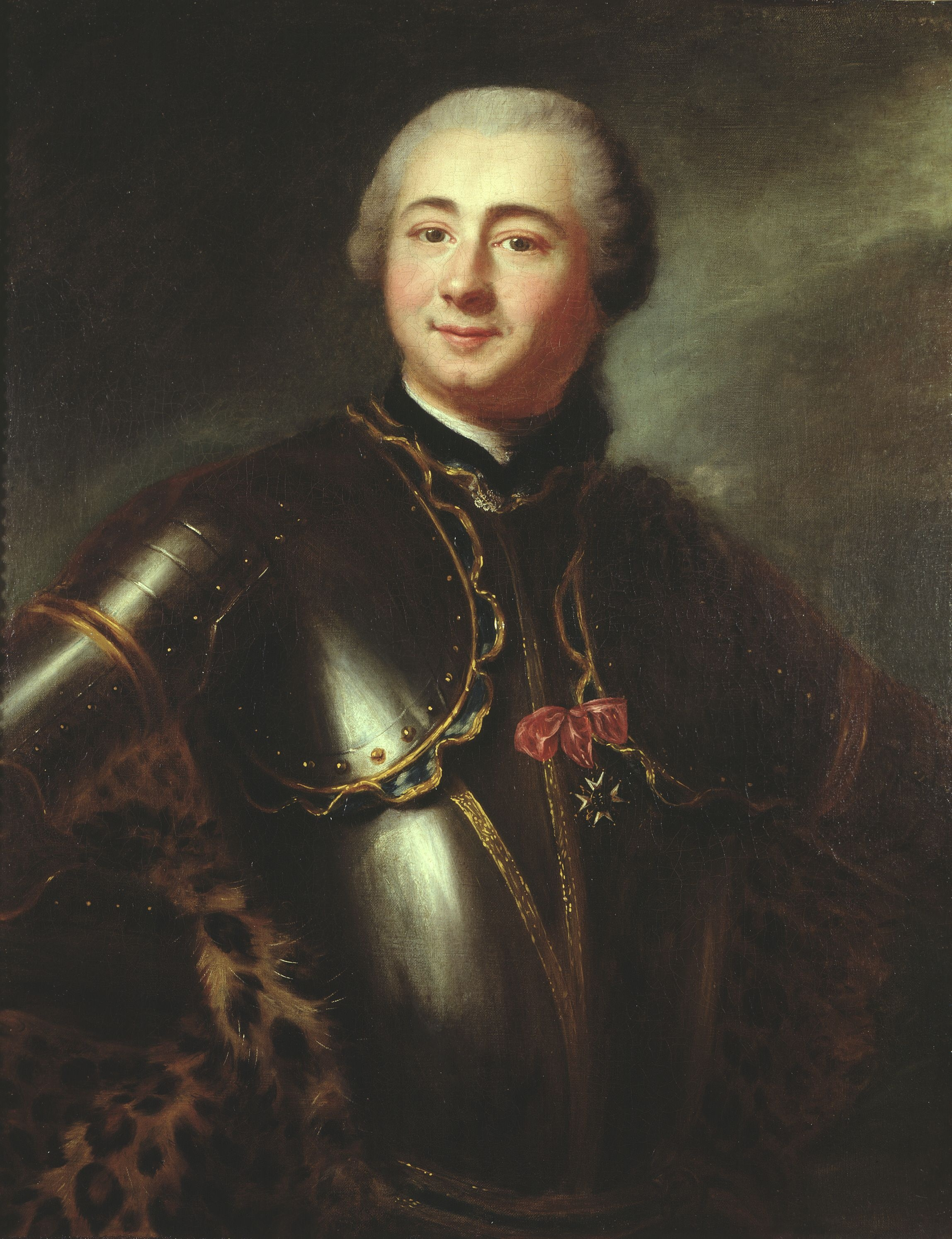
Marquis de Boishébert - Charles Deschamps de Boishébert et de Raffetot (1753)

The British Conquest of Acadia happened in 1710. Over the next forty-five years the Acadians refused to sign an unconditional oath of allegiance to Britain. During this time period Acadians participated in various militia operations against the British and maintained vital supply lines to the French fortresses of Fort Louisbourg and Fort Beausejour. During the Seven Years' War, the British sought both to neutralize any military threat Acadians posed and to interrupt the vital supply lines Acadians provided to Louisbourg by deporting Acadians from Acadia.

The first wave of these deportations began in 1755 with the Bay of Fundy campaign (1755). Many Acadians fled those operations to present-day New Brunswick and the French colony of Ile Saint-Jean, now known as Prince Edward Island.

After capturing Louisbourg on Ile Royal (present-day Cape Breton, Nova Scotia) in 1758, numerous Acadians left Ile St. Jean for present-day New Brunswick. At this time the second wave of the Expulsion began from Ile Saint Jean and Cape Breton and continued in earnest in New Brunswick. According to one historian, this wave of operations was considerably more devastating for the Acadians than the first one.

The Petitcodiac is situated between two smaller rivers – the Shepody River (off Shepody Bay) and the Memramcook river (the three bodies of water were often called "Trois-Rivières" by its inhabitants.) Weeks after the Expulsion began with the Bay of Fundy campaign (1755), the British forces raided villages at Chipoudy and Petitcodiac (Hillsborough, New Brunswick). As well, on November 17, 1755, George Scott took seven hundred troops and attacked twenty houses at Memramcook (Dorchester, New Brunswick). They arrested the Acadians that remained and killed two hundred head of livestock. Even after these raids, Acadians returned to these villages and the numbers grew as the deportation from peninsula Nova Scotia continued, followed by the deportation of present-day Prince Edward Island and Cape Breton.

On September 10, 1757, Captain John Knox of the Forty-third Regiment was ordered to take part in an 800 man joint force of rangers and regular troops to march against Chipoudy, which seemed to be the originating point for the Acadian and Mi'kmaq raids on Chignecto. Almost seven months later, on March 28, 1758, Gorham's Rangers raided Chipoudy and found only women and children; the men had left for Fort Cumberland, where they attacked a schooner. The Rangers were shocked at how fast the community had re-built after the previous raid.

== Campaign ==
In June 1758, Lieutenant Meech of Benoni Danks' Rangers along with fifty-five men advanced up the Petitcodiac River, suspecting that this was where the Acadian and Mi'kmaq raids originated. They made contact with 40 Acadians but were unable to catch them.

On July 1, 1758, Danks himself began to pursue the Acadians. They arrived at present day Moncton and Danks' Rangers ambushed about thirty Acadians, who were led by Joseph Broussard (Beausoleil). Many were driven into the river, three of them were killed and scalped, and others were captured. Broussard was seriously wounded. Danks reported that the scalps were Mi'kmaq and received payment for them. Thereafter, he received a reputation in local lore as being "one of the most reckless and brutal" of the Rangers.

In September 1758, Roger's Rangers burned an Acadian settlement of 100 buildings. The Acadians captured five of British troops and retreated with them to the Miramichi. The Acadians took prisoner William Caesar McCormick of William Stark's rangers and his detachment of three rangers and two light infantry privates from the 35th Regiment of Foot. They were taken to Miramichi and then Restogouch. (They were kept prisoner by Pierre du Calvet, who later released them to Halifax.)

November 12, 1758, Danks' Rangers sailed up the river and returned the next day with four men and twelve women and children as prisoners. The prisoners notified Danks about the location of Joseph Broussard's home (present day Boundary Creek). Danks' company sailed immediately up the Petitodiac to attack Broussard's home. By the time Danks arrived the house was vacant. Danks killed the livestock and burned the fields and village.

The Rangers returned to the river. Captain Silvanus Cobb continued to ferry Rangers up and down the river to destroy the houses and crops over two nights, November 13–14. On November 14, Acadian militia appeared early in the morning. Two of Danks' Rangers were missing. The Rangers overwhelmed the Acadians once Danks' reinforcement of a platoon of Rangers arrived. The Rangers took a dozen women and children hostage. Joseph Gorham reported that he had burned over a hundred homes and Danks reported he destroyed twenty three buildings.

The Rangers then returned to Fort Frederick at the mouth of the St. John River with their prisoners.

== Aftermath ==
The Acadian refugees from the Petitcodiac River campaign went to the Penobscot River, a region that Preble and Pownall were prepared to sweep in early 1759.

A part of the regulars under Lieutenant-Colonel Andrew Rollo arrested and deported Acadians in the Ile Saint-Jean campaign.

Major General Amherst dispatched Brigadier James Wolfe to the northeast along the coast in the Gulf of St. Lawrence campaign (1758). He sent Wolfe with three entire regiments and seven ships of the line to destroy Acadian fields and settlements. After Wolfe had left the area, the 1760 Battle of Restigouche led to the capture of several hundred Acadians at Boishébert's refugee camp at Petit-Rochelle.
