= Danks' Rangers =

- Active: 1756–1762
- Country: Great Britain
- Allegiance: British Crown
- Branch: British Army Ranger
- Type: Reconnaissance, Counter-insurgency, and Light Infantry
- Role: Reconnaissance, counter-insurgency, and light infantry operations
- Size: One Company
- Garrison/HQ: Fort Cumberland (1756–1762)
- Engagements: French and Indian War: Expulsion of the Acadians (1755-63); Louisbourg Expedition (1757); Cape Sable Campaign (1758); St. John River Campaign (1758-59); Petitcodiac River Campaign (1758); Siege of Louisbourg (1758); Battle of Quebec (1759); Siege of Havana (1762)

Commanders
- Notable commanders: Captain Benoni Danks

Danks' Rangers was a ranger unit raised in colonial North America and led by Captain Benoni Danks (ca. 1716-1776). It was modeled on and often served alongside of the better known Gorham's Rangers. The unit was recruited in early 1756, during the early stages of the Seven Years' War / French and Indian War, from among men serving in two then-disbanding New England provincial battalions stationed in Nova Scotia. Raised to help protect the British garrison on the Isthmus of Chignecto and secure the area after the siege of Fort Beauséjour, their principle foes were Acadian and Mi'kmaq Indians conducting a low-level insurgency against the British authorities in Nova Scotia. Their primary area of operations was the northwestern portion of Nova Scotia and the north and eastern parts of what would later become New Brunswick. The unit averaged a little over one hundred men for much of its existence, although it seems to have been augmented to 125 for the attack on Havana in 1762. The company often operated in tandem with Gorham's Rangers, based out of Halifax, Nova Scotia, and after 1761, the two companies were combined into a Nova Scotia ranging corps, led by Major Joseph Gorham.

== Composition & Activities ==
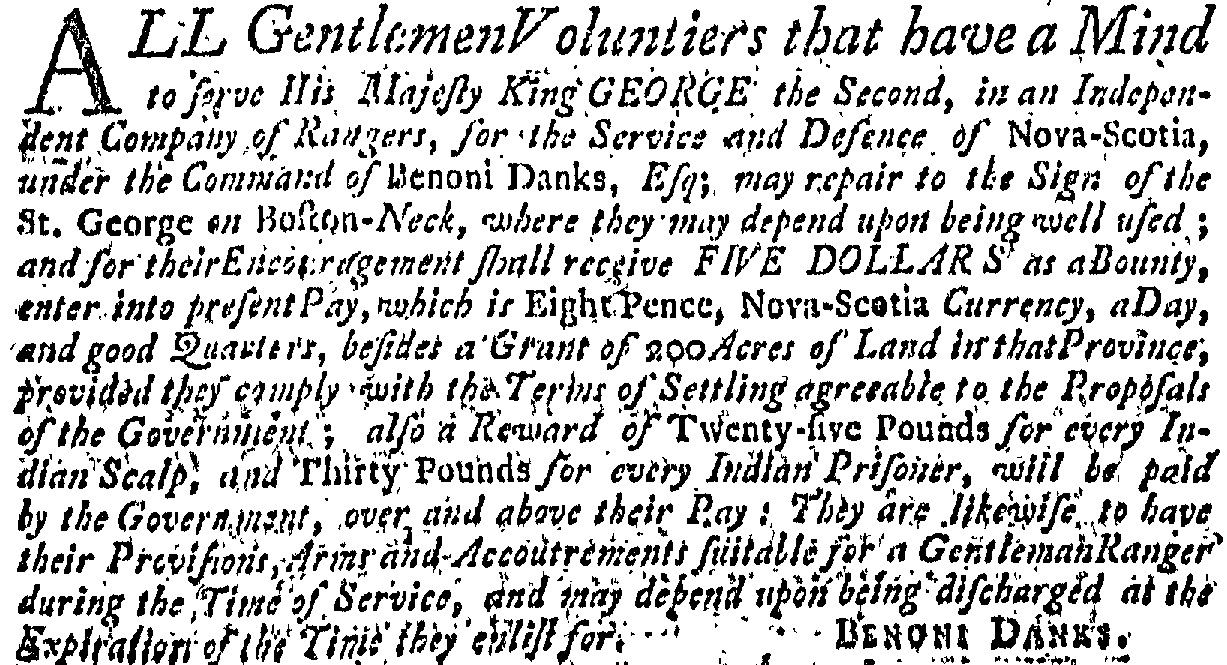
Danks Rangers 1757 Recruitment Advertisement. Boston News-Letter 18 Nov. 1757

In addition to Yankees from New England, the unit contained Scottish and Irish immigrants as well, and a half-dozen Native Americans from New England. The company performed reconnaissance duties and frontier guerrilla warfare. They not only played an important role in the Acadian Removals (1755-1760), but they took part in a number of important campaigns during the war, particularly the landing at Louisburg in 1758, and the Siege of Quebec in 1759. The unit suffered heavy casualties as a result of repeated skirmishing with Canadian militia and allied Indians around the edges of the Quebec siege and, for a time, after Danks was seriously wounded, the unit was absorbed into the ranger company of Captain Moses Hazen. As part of the combined Nova Scotia ranger corps, Danks and his company took part in the Siege of Havana in 1762, where, according to Israel Putnam, Danks sold his commission in the rangers at Havana on 23 Sept. 1762 to Andrew Watson, who commanded the company for the next few months until the unit was disbanded after half its men had succumbed to tropical diseases. The survivors were drafted into British Army regiments at occupied Havana whose ranks were equally depleted by illness.

== Scalping Controversy ==
The unit was loathed by the Mi'kmaq who lived near Fort Cumberland, the units' main base of operation, and they also suffered from a poor reputation among the early Anglo-American settlers to the region—apparently because of their reputation for cruelty and for their scalping of enemy combatants and non-combatants alike, regardless of their identity. The following account of Danks and his company comes from the notes compiled by Arthur G. Doughty, the editor of the journals of John Knox, an Irish officer in the regulars who was stationed at Fort Cumberland in 1759 and often assigned to accompany Danks' unit on missions:

Doughty says of Danks, "He appears to have been one of the most daring officers in the service, and particularly energetic in attacking the Indians," but goes on to say that the company "were not over scrupulous in the matter of taking scalps". He makes this claim as there is evidence that while they were given bounties by various colonial authorities for the scalps of Indians, the unit was accused of scalping Acadians and Canadians as well and turning in their scalps, falsely claiming them to be from Indians. His source for this accusation is a letter written in 1791 by an early Nova Scotia settler, the Rev. Hugh Graham. In it, Graham has the following to say about the activities of Danks' company during the final phase of the Expulsion of the Acadians:

"A Party of the Rangers, a Regiment chiefly employed in scouring the Country of the deluded French who had unfortunately fallen under the Bann of British Policy, came upon 4 French Men, who had with all possible Caution ventur'd out from their Skulking Retreats to pick up some of their straggling Cattle or hidden Treasure. The solitary few, the pitiable four had just sat down, weary & faint, on the Bank [of] a Stream in order to refresh themselves with some Food and Rest, when this Party of the Rangers surprizd & apprehended them. And as there was a Bounty on Indian Scalps (a Blot on Britain's Escutcheon) the Soldiers soon made the supplicating Signal, the Officers turn'd their Backs and the French were instantly shot and scalp'd. A Similar Instance happened about the same time. A Party of the Rangers brought in one day 25 Scalps pretending that they were Indian. And the Commanding Officer at the Fort then Col. Wilmot, afterwards Governor Wilmot (a poor Tool), gave Orders that the Bounty should be paid them. Capt. Houston who had at that time the Charge of the Military Chest objected [to] such Proceedings both in the Letter & Spirit of them. The Col. told him 'That According to Law the French were all out of the French, that the Bounty on Indian scalps was according to Law, and that tho' the Law might in some Instances be strain'd a little yet there was a Necessity for winking at such things.' Upon which Huston in Obedience to Orders paid down, telling them that the Curse of God should ever attend such guilty Deeds."

Doughty further observed that "these Rangers almost without Exception clos'd their days in Wretchedness and particularly a Captain Danks, who ever rode to the Extreme of his Commission in every barbarous Proceeding. In the Cumberland Insurrection [during the American Revolution] he was suspected to be "Jack on both Sides of the Bush" left Cumberland (that place) in a small Jigger bound for Windsor, was taken ill on the Passage, thrown into the hold among the ballast was taken out at Windsor half dead, and had little better than the burial of a Dog. He liv'd under a general Dislike & died without one to regret his Death."

While some historians have suggested that Graham intentionally exaggerated his account due to an attempt to transform the story into a moralizing one, in addition to the fact that it was written a religious figure more than thirty years after the events described took place a recent article by historian Brian D. Carroll suggests the Mi'kmaq targeted rangers from Danks' company specifically for violent retribution. And Carroll further quotes Knox himself recording regular British troops having to defend an Acadian woman from members of the company during the Petitcodiac River Campaign in 1758.

== Company's Personnel ==
The sources for the names of the company's personnel below are two muster rolls, one (incomplete) from 1758, and another (complete) from 1761. Both are in the American Antiquarian Society in Worcester Massachusetts (the French and Indian War and Massachusetts Collections, respectively). Another source was a list of sick rangers and deserters from the company in the same collections.

=== Officers ===
==== 1758 ====
- Captain Benoni Danks
- Captain-Lieutenant Thomas Armstrong [Died in Quebec, 1759]
- Lieutenant John Walker
- Lieutenant Daniel Meech [Died in Quebec, 1759]

==== 1761-1762 ====
- Captain Benoni Danks [resigned 23 Sept. 1762]
- Captain Andrew Watson [Sept.-Dec. 1762]
- Captain-Lieutenant John Walker
- Lieutenant Thomas Dixon
- Lieutenant Stephen Holland
- 2nd Lieutenant Marquis de Compte de Gravena [a.k.a. "Peter De Compt"]
- 2nd Lieutenant Samuel Shipton [Died in Havana, 1762]
- 2nd Lieutenant John Watmough [Died at Havana, 1762]
- Dr. Nicholas Fredrick Meyer, surgeon [Only on 1761 muster]
- Abraham Dupee (Dupuis?), surgeon

=== Non-Commissioned Officers ===
==== Sergeants ====
- James Turner, (1758)
- Reuben Taylor, (1758)
- Ichabod Warner, (1758)
- Jazen (Jason?) Hazard (1758)
- Daniel Goodwin (cpl 1758, sgt 1761)
- William Walsh (cpl 1758, sgt 1761)
- Zebulon Roe (pvt 1758, sgt 1761)
- Enoch Goodwin (pvt 1758, sgt 1761)

==== Corporals ====
- Joshua How (1758)
- Samuel Hall (1758)
- Amos Hutchinson (pvt 1758, cpl 1761)
- Alexander Stewart (1761)
- Philemon Cassidy (1761)
- Thomas Newton (1761)

=== Drummers ===
- William Saunders (1758-1761)
- Rice Davis (1758-1761)

=== Enlisted Men ===
==== Anglo-Americans & Other Europeans ====
- Samuel Allen
- John Archer
- Justice Burke
- Thomas Bantom
- Simeon Burrs
- Leonard Bowers
- John Brown
- Thomas Burnett
- William Burns
- John Bratis
- Thomas Corkindale
- John Cornish
- Daniel Corben
- John Collins
- Henry Curtis
- Jacob Clark
- Charles Cassidy
- John Cassidy
- Robert Crossman
- John David
- Andrew Dodge
- Isaiah Dibble
- John Dunham
- John Daugherty
- Jonathan Farn (Fern?)
- William Forth
- Patrick Fowler
- Jacob Fox
- Henry Foster
- William Fielding
- John Giels
- Ebenezer Garey
- David Goodwin
- John Green
- John Grey
- Morris Grant
- James Hamilton
- Abraham Hillhigh
- Thomas Hill
- Benjamin Hatch
- Charles Hammon
- Ignatius Holtread
- John Haraden
- Seth Harvey
- Ebenezer Hodgkins
- Nehemiah Hall
- Jabesh (Jabez?) Hull
- Ebenezer Humphreys
- Jeremiah Jackson
- Samuel Kilham
- Daniel Kinney

- John Lynen
- Robert Lawrence
- Richard Lovejoy
- Alexander Lawhead
- Nicholas Lord
- James Montgomery
- Daniel Mossett
- Darius Minor
- John Midsker
- William Millburn
- Christopher Minor
- John McKnight
- Clement Ness
- William Nearey
- John Peze (Pease?)
- Nicholas Paxton
- James Radford
- John Rumins
- Daniel Ramsdale
- John Rogers
- Ebenezer Roberts
- Daniel Roods
- Joseph Rooker
- Thomas Rowe
- William Read
- William Read, Jr
- James Rignor
- Isaac Robinson
- Barnaby Stinson
- Asia Sneiling
- John Sackett
- Matthew Smythe
- Thomas Seagrove
- Stephen Solomon
- William Sherman
- Casper Strough
- Amos Trevoy
- John Thompson
- Roger Taylor
- Samuel Tots---
- Joseph -----
- William Tuttson
- Thomas Tullson
- Matthew Tappean
- Benjamin Warren
- Robert Wiley
- Jedediah Williams
- John Wilson
- Josiah Webb
- Robert Wilson
- John Willington

==== Native Americans ====
- Moses Barns/Barnabus (Mashpee Wampanoag)
- Joseph Caesar (Narragansett)
- Joseph Cowett (Herring Pond Wampanoag)

- ----- Jaquish (Mohegan)
- Joseph Ralph (Nauset)
- Samson Sacowen/Sockiont (Pequot)

== See also ==
- Gorham's Rangers
- Mi'kmaq people
- William Shirley
- Paul Mascarene
- Robert Monckton
- Charles Lawrence
- Major Joseph Gorham
- Robert Rogers
- Military history of Nova Scotia
- Military history of the Mi’kmaq People
- Military history of the Acadians
