= Cape Sable campaign =

Military campaign of the French and Indian War

- Part of the expulsion of the Acadians
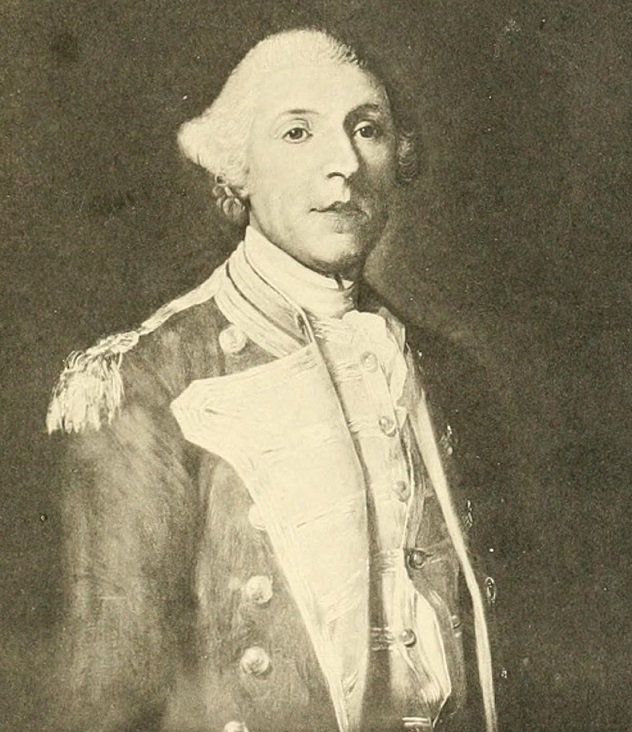
- Portrait of Roger Morris by Benjamin West
Date	September–October 1758
Location	Cape Sable Region, Nova Scotia
Result	British victory

Commanders and leaders
Roger Morris; Jedidiah Preble; Joseph Gorham; Erasmus James Philipps	Jean-Baptiste de Gay Desenclaves; Joseph Landry; Charles Dantermong

Units involved
35th Regiment of Foot; Gorham's Rangers; Royal Americans; Rogers' Rangers	Acadia militia; Mi'kmaq militia

The Cape Sable campaign occurred in the fall of 1758 during the French and Indian War. The British sought to neutralize Acadian support for the French by deporting them. Colonel Roger Morris led a force of 325 British soldiers, aided by Captain Joseph Gorham with 60 rangers and Rogers' Rangers, to destroy the Acadian settlements in present-day Shelburne County and Yarmouth County, Nova Scotia, Canada.

According to one historian, the level of Acadian suffering greatly increased in the late summer of 1758. Along with campaigns on Ile Saint-Jean, in the Gulf of St. Lawrence, at St. John River campaign and the Petitcodiac River campaign, the British targeted the Cape Sable region, known as Pobomcoup.

== Historical context ==
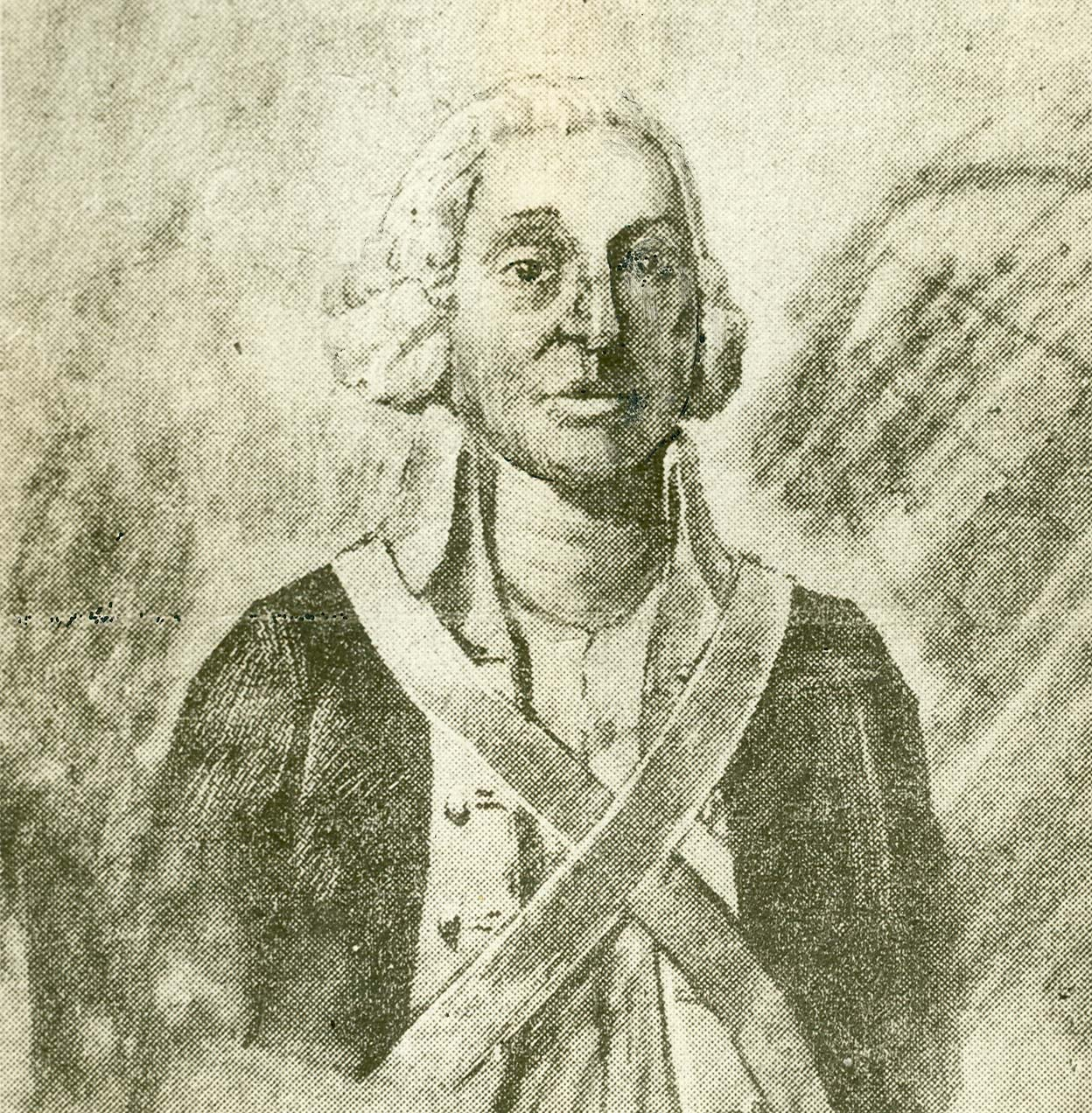
Major Jedidiah Preble

The British Conquest of Acadia happened in 1710. Over the next forty-five years the Acadians refused to sign an unconditional oath of allegiance to Britain. During this time period Acadians participated in various militia operations against the British and maintained vital supply lines to the French Fortress of Louisbourg and Fort Beausejour. During the French and Indian War (1754–1758), the British sought to neutralize any military threat Acadians posed and to interrupt the vital supply lines the Acadians provided to Louisbourg by deporting them.

The first wave of deportations began in 1755 with the Bay of Fundy campaign, which targeted Beaubassin/Chignecto, Grand-Pré, Rivière-aux-Canards, Pisiguit, Cobequid, and Annapolis Royal. In April 1756, Major Jedidiah Preble and his New England troops, on their return to Boston, raided Pubnico, which lies within the Cape Sable region, and captured 72 men, women and children.

== Campaign ==
En route to the St. John River campaign in September 1758, Col. Robert Monckton sent Maj. Roger Morris of the 35th Regiment, in command of two men-of-war and transport ships with 325 soldiers, to deport more Acadians. On September 16, Morris and Capt. Joseph Gorham went ashore near the mouth of the Bay of Saltponds River, believed to be the present day Argyle. and began to search, but unable to locate anyone, on October 4 they began to burn farms. On October 9 they found father Jean-Baptiste de Gay Desenclaves (whose principle residence was Tusket) and 36 families (6 of which were Mi'kmaq) who were imprisoned in the local church. On October 28, Monckton's troops sent the women and children to Georges Island, while the men were kept behind and forced to destroy their village. On October 31, they were also sent to Halifax. About 130 Acadians and seven Mi'kmaq escaped.

In the spring of 1759, Maj. Erasmus James Philipps arranged for Gorham and his rangers to take prisoner 151 Acadians. They reached Georges Island with them on June 29 and were deported to Britain in November 1759. The remaining 100 Acadians and Mi'kmaq at Cape Sable fired upon Capt. Silvanus Cobb in July 1759.

The Cape Sable region remains one of only two places in Acadia, the other being Memramcook, where people of Acadian descent lived before and after the Expulsion. Acadian families began to return to the area after 1767, many of whom are descended from the founder of Pobomcoup, Philippe Mius d'Entremont.

== See also ==
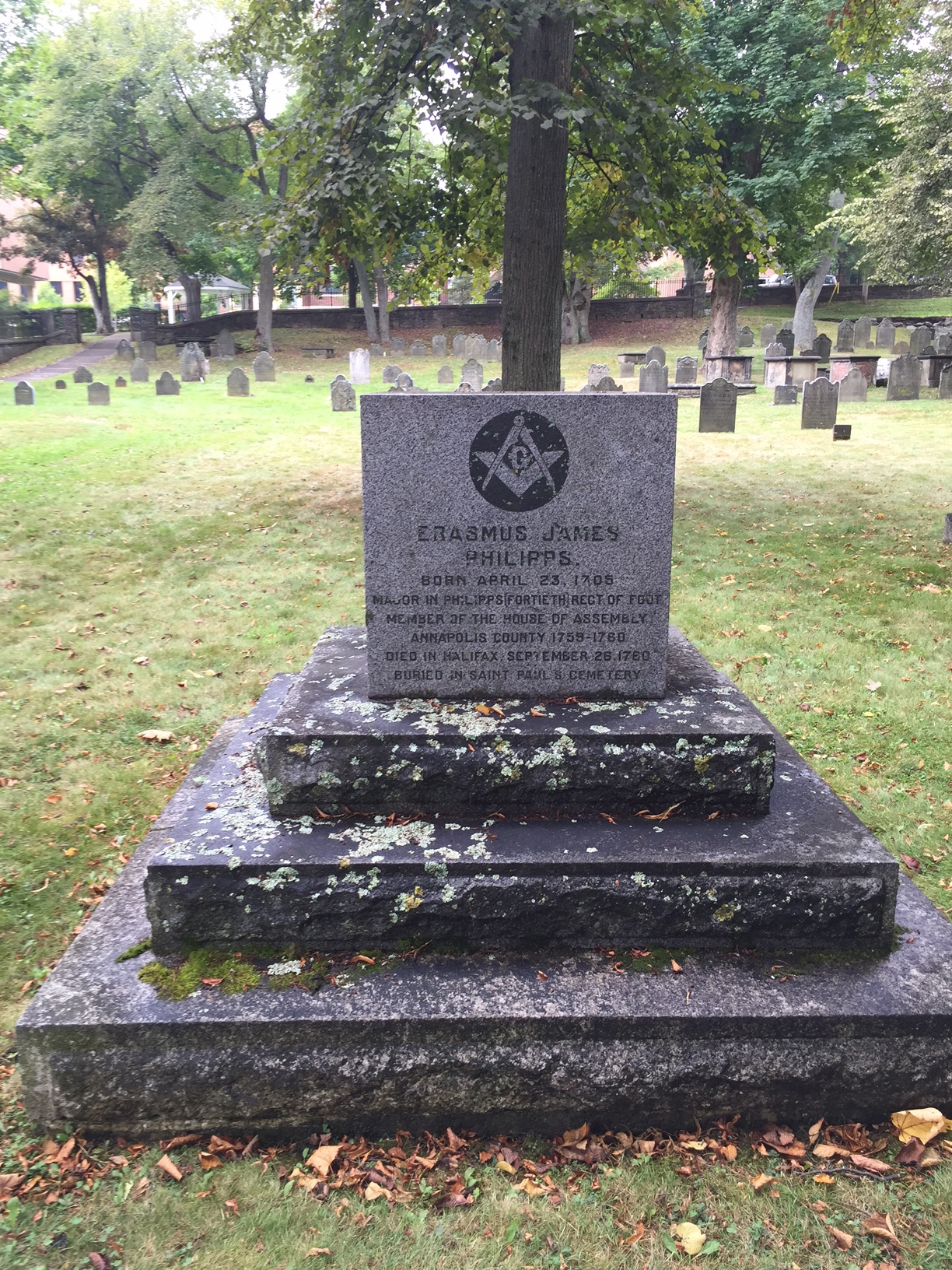
Erasmus James Philipps, Old Burying Ground (Halifax, Nova Scotia)

- Military history of the Mi'kmaq people
- Military history of the Acadians
- History of Nova Scotia
