= St. John River campaign =

Campaign of the French and Indian War

Saint John River campaign
- Part of the expulsion of the Acadians
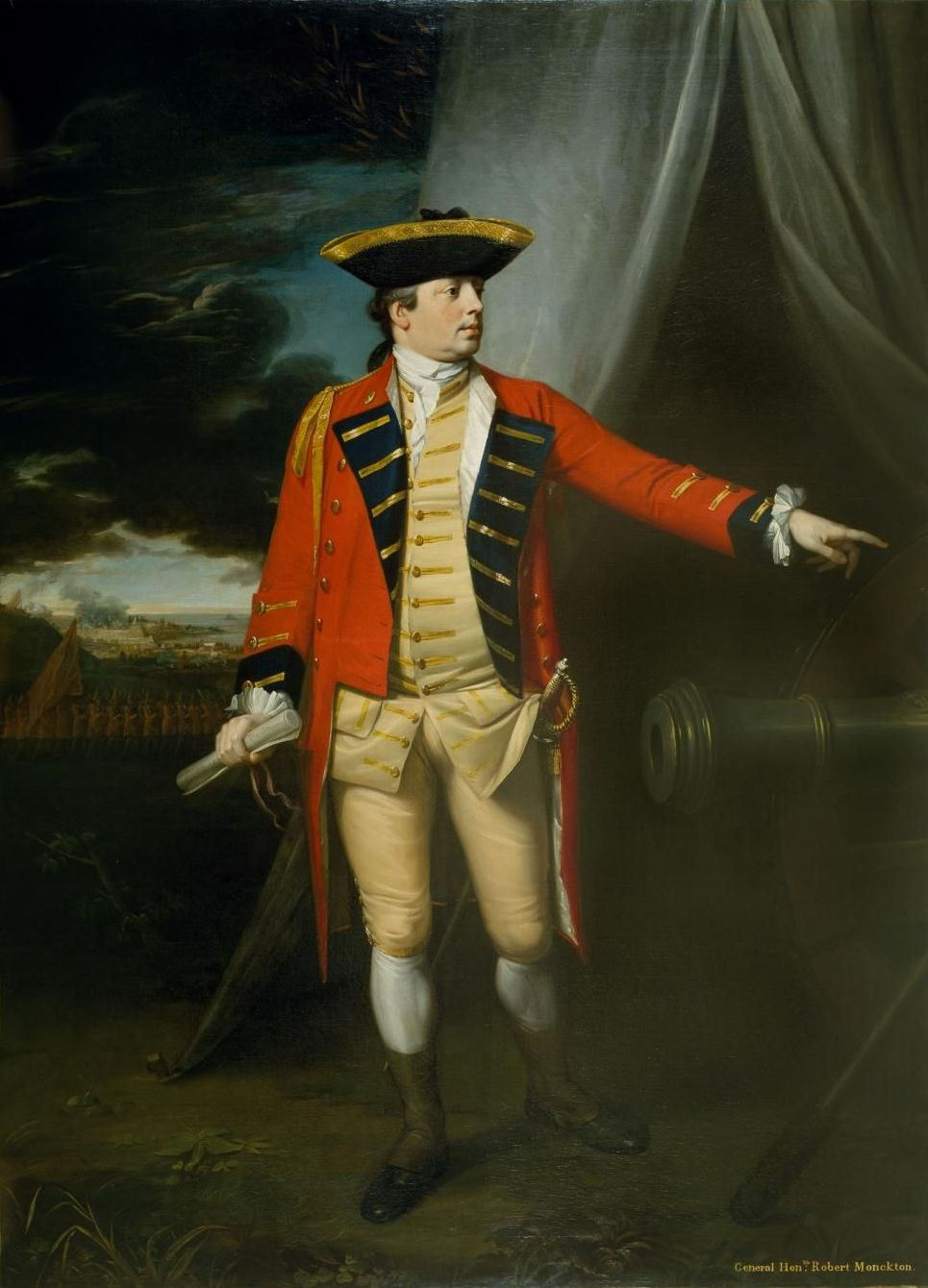
- Portrait of Robert Monckton, British commander in the Saint John River campaign, by Benjamin West, 1763
Date	November 1758 – February 1759
Location	Saint John River, present-day New Brunswick
Result	British victory

Commanders and leaders
Robert Monckton; George Scott; Joseph Gorham; Moses Hazen; Benoni Danks; Silvanus Cobb; William Stark; Jonathan Brewer; John McCurdy †	Joseph Broussard (Beausoliel); Charles Deschamps de Boishébert et de Raffetot; Joseph Godin dit Beauséjour; Charles Germain

Units involved
40th Regiment of Foot; Gorham's Rangers; Danks' Rangers; Roger's Rangers	Acadia militia Wabanaki Confederacy (Maliseet militia and Mi'kmaq militia)

The St. John River campaign occurred during the French and Indian War when Colonel Robert Monckton led a force of 1150 British soldiers to destroy the Acadian settlements along the banks of the Saint John River until they reached the largest village of Sainte-Anne des Pays-Bas (present day Fredericton, New Brunswick) in February 1759. Monckton was accompanied by Captain George Scott as well as New England Rangers led by Joseph Goreham, Captain Benoni Danks, as well as William Stark and Moses Hazen, both of Rogers' Rangers.

Under the naval command of Silvanus Cobb, the British started at the bottom of the river with raiding Kennebecasis and Managoueche (City of Saint John), where the British built Fort Frederick. Then they moved up the river and raided Grimross (Arcadia, New Brunswick), Jemseg, and finally they reached Sainte-Anne des Pays-Bas.

The Acadian militia was led by French officer Charles Deschamps de Boishébert et de Raffetot and Acadian Joseph Godin dit Bellefontaine. There were about 100 Acadian families on the Saint John River, with a large concentration at Ste Anne. Most of them had taken refuge there from earlier deportation operations, such as the Ile Saint-Jean campaign. There were also about 1000 Maliseet.

According to one historian, the level of Acadian suffering greatly increased in the late summer of 1758. Along with campaigns on Ile Saint-Jean, in the Gulf of St. Lawrence, at Cape Sable, and the Petitcodiac River campaign, the British targeted the Saint John River.

== Historical context ==
The British Conquest of Acadia happened in 1710. Over the next forty-five years the Acadians refused to sign an unconditional oath of allegiance to Britain. During this time period Acadians participated in various militia operations against the British and maintained vital supply lines to the French Fortress of Louisbourg and Fort Beausejour. During the French and Indian War, the British sought to neutralize any military threat Acadians posed and to interrupt the vital supply lines Acadians provided to Louisbourg by deporting Acadians from Acadia.

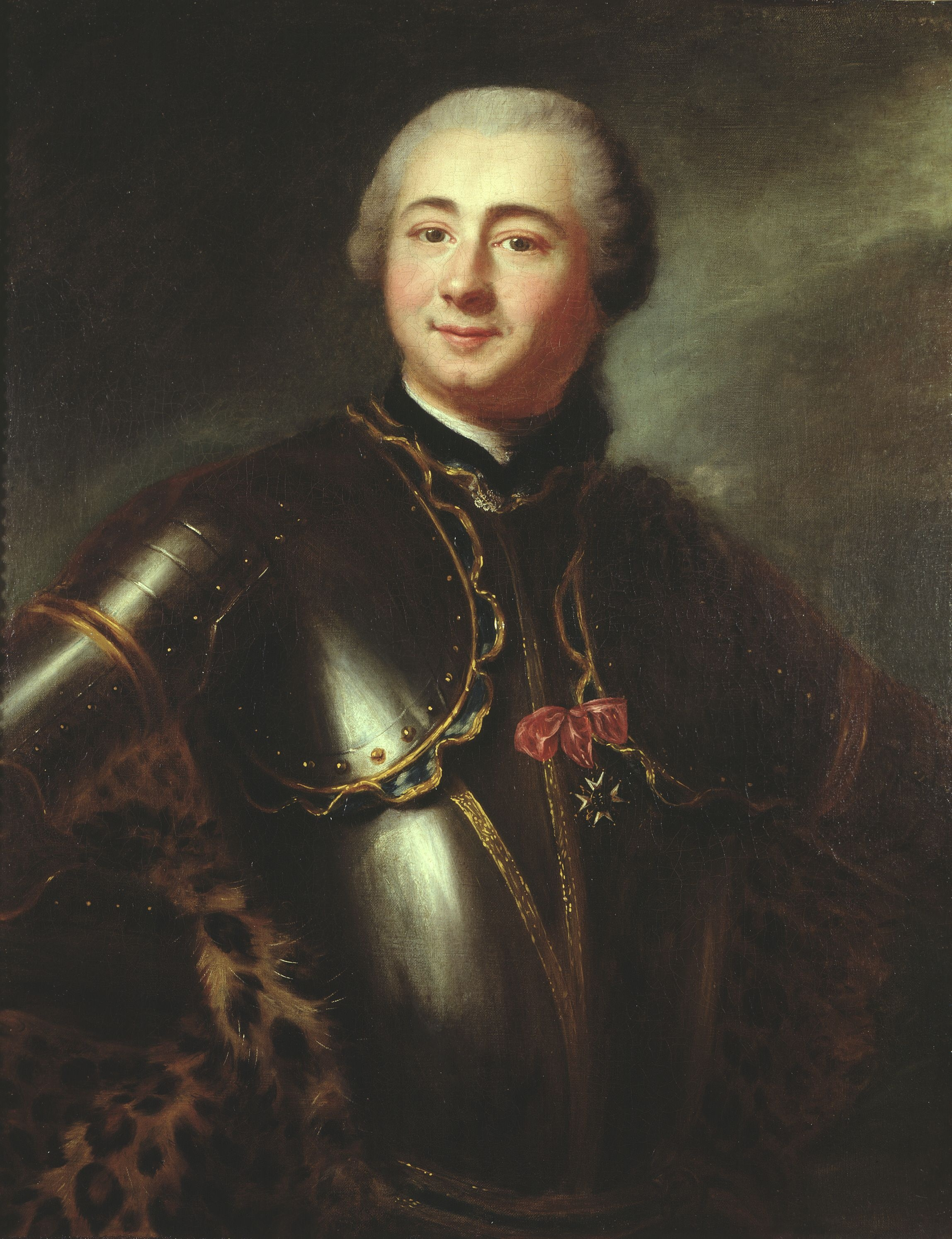
Boishebert (1753)

Acadians had lived in the Saint John valley almost continuously since the early seventeenth century. After the Conquest of Acadia (1710), Acadians migrated from peninsula Nova Scotia to the French-occupied Saint John River. These Acadians were seen as the most resistant to British rule in the region.

The Saint John River residents had always proven effective at resisting the British. The Maliseet militia, from their base at Meductic, conducted effective warfare along with the Mi'kmaq militia against New England throughout the colonial wars. As late as 1748, there were only twelve French-speaking families living on the river. On October 28, 1748, at the end of King George's War, the Acadians and Mi'kmaq prevented John Gorham from landing to acquire an oath of allegiance. His rangers were fired upon killing three of the rangers and wounding three, while Gorham took two Mi'kmaq prisoner. In 1749, at the beginning of Father Le Loutre's War, Boishebert rebuked British naval officer John Rous at St. John. Boishébert built Fort Boishebert after withdrawing from the mouth of the Saint John River under the terms of an agreement arranged by Captain John Rous and Edward How. The fort was subsequently abandoned in 1751 by Ignace-Philippe Aubert de Gaspé when the French reestablished their control and fortified the mouth of the Saint John River with Fort Menagoueche. In 1749, Boishebert assigned Acadian Joseph Godin dit Bellefontaine to lead the Acadian militia in the St. John Region.

In April 1755, while searching for a wrecked vessel at Port La Tour, Cobb discovered the French schooner Marguerite (Margarett), taking war supplies to the Saint John River for Boishebert at Fort Menagoueche. Cobb returned to Halifax with the news and was ordered by Governor Charles Lawrence to blockade the harbour until Captain William Kensey arrived in the warship HMS Vulture, and then to assist Kensey in capturing the French prize and taking it to Halifax. During this time the British took captive a sergeant of Boishebert's detachment Grandcour, who was caught at the mouth of the river.

Immediately after the Battle of Fort Beauséjour (1755), Robert Monckton sent a detachment under the command of John Rous to take Fort Menagoueche. De Boishebert knew that he faced a superior force so he burned the fort, however, he maintained control of the river through guerrilla warfare. The destruction of Fort Menagoueche left Louisbourg as the last French fort in Acadia. Boishebert made his first strike in the Battle of Petitcodiac.

The first wave of these deportations began in 1755 with the Bay of Fundy campaign (1755). During the expulsion, the Saint John River valley became the center of the Acadian and Wabanaki Confederacy resistance to the British military in the region. The leader of the resistance was French militia officer Charles Deschamps de Boishébert et de Raffetot. In February 1756, Governor Vaudreuil ordered Boishebert "to maintain, to the last extremity, the post on the River St. John." On February 8, 1756, Acadians ambushed a British vessel at the mouth of the Saint John River, forcing it to return to Port Royal. He was stationed at Sainte-Anne des Pays-Bas and from there issued orders for various raids such as the Raid on Lunenburg (1756) and the Battle of Petitcodiac (1755). He was also responsible to locate the Acadian refugees along the Saint John River.

After the Siege of Louisbourg (1758), the second wave of the Expulsion of the Acadians began with the Ile Saint-Jean campaign (campaign against present-day Prince Edward Island), and the removal of Acadians from Ile Royale (Cape Breton, Nova Scotia). As a result, Acadians fled these areas for the villages along the banks of the Saint John River, including the largest communities at Grimross (present day Arcadia, New Brunswick) and Sainte-Anne des Pays-Bas.

=== Fort Frederick ===
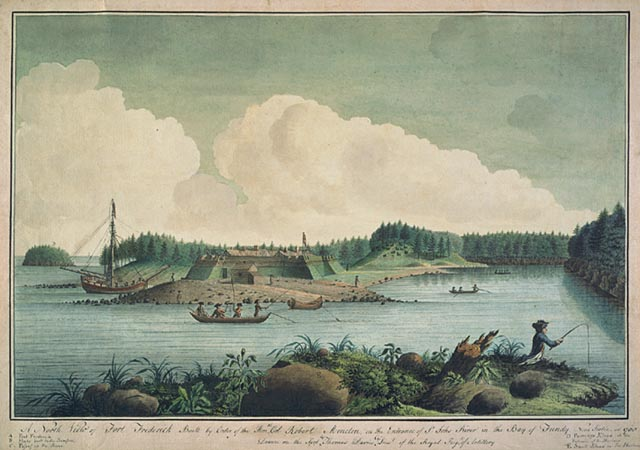
St. John River campaign: The construction of Fort Frederick (1758) by Thomas Davies

On September 13, 1758, Monckton and a strong force of regulars and rangers (Gorham's Rangers, Danks' Rangers and Rogers' Rangers) left Halifax and arrived at the mouth of the Saint John River a week later. While Fort Menagoueche had been destroyed (1755), when the British arrived, a few militia members fired shots from the site and fled upstream in boats. The armed sloop Providence was wrecked in the Reversing Falls trying to follow.

Monckton established a new base of operations by reconstructing Fort Menagoueche, which he renamed Fort Frederick. Establishing Fort Frederick allowed the British to virtually cut off the communications and supplies to the villages on the Saint John River.

Monckton was accompanied by the New England Rangers, which had three companies that were commanded by Joseph Goreham, Captain Benoni Danks and George Scott.

When Monckton and his troops appeared on the Saint John River, Boishébert retreated. The Acadians were left virtually unprotected in their settlements at Grimross, Jemseg and Sainte-Anne des Pays-Bas. Boishébert directed Acadians to go to Quebec City, but many militiamen under Major Joseph Godin (Bellefontaine) chose to remain in Ste-Anne to defend their lands despite the English advances and numerical superiority.

== Campaign ==
=== Raid on Grimross ===
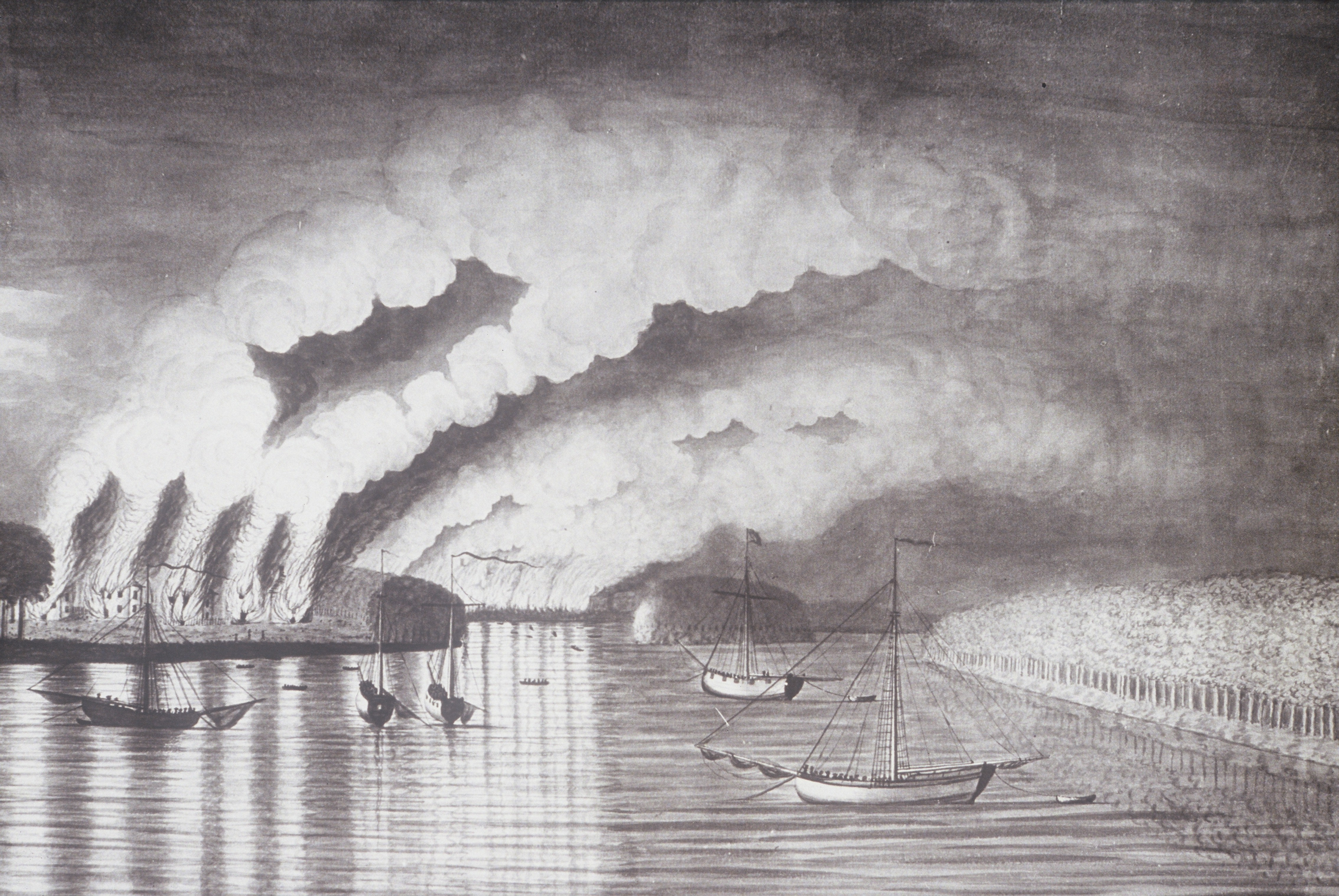
St. John River campaign: A View of the Plundering and Burning of the City of Grimross (present day Arcadia, New Brunswick) by Thomas Davies in 1758. This is the only contemporaneous image of the expulsion of the Acadians.

On October 1, Monckton left Fort Frederick with his boats, regulars, and rangers above the Reversing Falls. Two days later, they arrived at the village of Grimross. The village of 50 families that had migrated there in 1755 were forced to abandon their homes. Monckton's troops burned every building, torched the fields, and killed all the livestock.

=== Raid on Jemseg ===
Two days later, Monckton arrived at the village of Jemseg, New Brunswick, and burned it to the ground. Then he returned to Fort Frederick at the mouth of the Saint John River.

=== Raid on Sainte-Anne des Pays-Bas ===
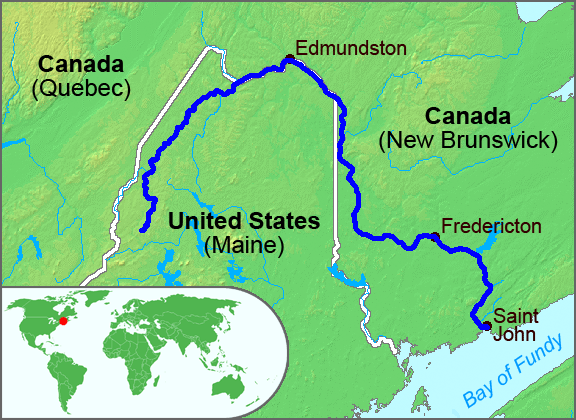
St. John River, New Brunswick

Monckton did not continue on to Sainte-Anne des Pays-Bas (present day Fredericton, New Brunswick) because of the impending winter. Then, afraid of being trapped by the frozen river, he turned around at Maugerville and went back to Fort Frederick, and afterwards sailed for Halifax with thirty Acadian families as prisoners. Major Robert Morris was put in charge of the fort.

Almost three months later, in February 1759, Monckton sent Captain John McCurdy and his rangers out from Fort Frederick to go to Ste. Anne's Point on snow- shoes. Captain McCurdy died of an accident along the way and was replaced by Lieutenant Moses Hazen. When the Acadians realized the British were going to continue their advance, most of them retreated to the Maliseet village at Aukpaque (Ecoupag) for protection.

On 18 February 1759, Lieutenant Hazen and 22 men arrived at Sainte-Anne des Pays-Bas. They pillaged and burned the village of 147 buildings, including two Mass-houses and all of the barns and stables. They burned a large store-house, and with it a large quantity of hay, wheat, peas, oats, etc., killing 212 horses, about 5 head of cattle, a large number of hogs and so forth. They also burned the church (located just west of Old Government House, Fredericton). Only a handful of Acadians were found in the area, most had already fled north with their families.

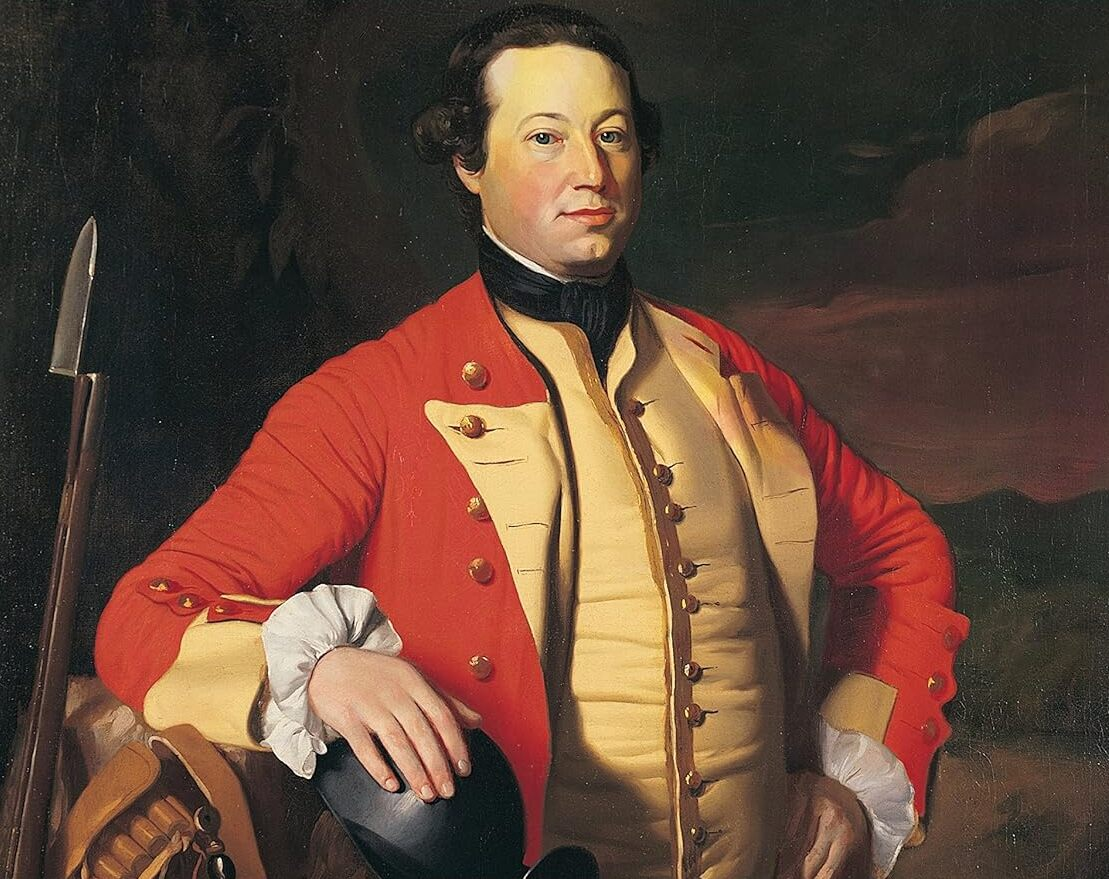
Captain George Scott by John Singleton Copley (c. 1758), The Brook

In February 1759, Acadian militia leader Joseph Godin dit Bellefontaine and a group of Acadians ambushed the Rangers. Eventually Godin and his militia was overwhelmed by Hazen's rangers. Godin resisted Hazen's efforts to get him to sign an oath of allegiance, even in the face of Hazen torturing and killing his daughter and 3 of his grandchildren in front of him. The rangers scalped six Acadians and took six prisoners during this raid. Godin "by his speech and largess . . . had instigated and maintained the Indians in their hatred and war against the English." Godin was taken prisoner by the rangers and brought, after having been joined by his remaining family, to Annapolis Royal. From there he was taken to Boston, Halifax, and England; later he was sent to Cherbourg.

Godin's official statement to the French Crown states:

The Sieur Joseph [Godin] Bellefontaine [Sieur de] Beauséjour of the Saint John River, son of Gabriel (officer aboard the king's vessels in Canada (in Acadie) and of Angélique-Roberte Jeanna), was major of all the Saint John River Militia by order of Monsieur de la Galissonnière, from the 10 April 1749 and always was in these functions during the said war until he was captured by the enemy, and he owns several leagues of land, where he had the grief to have seen the massacre of one of his daughters and her three children by the English, who wanted, out of cruelty and fear to force him to take their part ... he only escaped such a fate by his flight into the woods, carrying with him two other children of the daughter.

He and his wife spent the remainder of their lives in Cherbourg France, where they received 300 French Livres of annual revenue as compensation (In response to Hazen scalping Godin's family members, General Amherst stated that Hazen had "sullied his merit with me".)

April 22, 1759, the Acadian militia took a ranger prisoner who was outside of Fort Frederick.

On 18 May 1759 a group of soldiers left the confines of Fort Frederick to go fishing. They were attacked by a group of native warriors and fled to the protection of the fort walls. One soldier did not make it and the natives carted him off. Again on 15 June 1759, another party of soldiers was out fishing on the river and was ambushed by a militia of Acadians and natives. During the fight the soldiers fought from the confines of a sloop while others fired cannons from the fort. One of the soldiers was killed and scalped and another was badly wounded. The soldiers pursued the militia but was unable to find it.

The command at Fort Frederick was not convinced the village was totally destroyed and sent at least three more expeditions up river to Ste Anne between July and September 1759. The soldiers captured some Acadians along the way, burned their homes, destroyed their crops and slaughtered their cattle. The September expedition involved more than 90 men. At present-day French Lake on the Oromocto River, on 8 September the Acadian militia ambushed the British rangers. This victory for the Acadian militia resulted in the deaths of at least 9 rangers and three severely wounded.

== Consequences ==
Due to the campaign targeting their supplies, the remaining Acadians in the area experienced famine. Governor Pierre François de Rigaud, Marquis de Vaudreuil-Cavagnal reported that 1,600 Acadians immigrated to Québec City in 1759. During this same winter, Quebec also suffered a famine and a smallpox epidemic broke out, killing over 300 Acadian refugees in the region. Some returned to St. John only to be imprisoned on Georges Island in Halifax Harbour.

In the spring of 1759 twenty-nine of the refugees from the Saint John River area went farther up the St. Lawrence to the area around Bécancour, Quebec, where they successfully established a community.

After the fall of Quebec on September 18, 1759, the resistance ended. The Maliseet and Acadians of the Saint John River surrendered to the British at Fort Frederick and Fort Cumberland. On 2 January 1760 most of the Acadian men who had come to Fort Frederick were boarded onto ships. The next day, the women and children were put on board, and the ship sailed for Halifax. Within weeks of their arrival in the provincial capital the captured Acadians were bound for France.

In 1761, there were 42 Acadians at St Ann and 10–12 at Grimross. In 1762, Lieutenant Gilfred Studholme, who commanded the garrison at Saint John, was unsuccessful in removing the remaining Acadians from the Saint John River in preparation for the arrival of the New England Planters. With the migration of returning Acadians after the close of the Seven Years' War in the 1760s to the river valley and other areas of what is now New Brunswick, the region became the center of Acadian life in the maritime region.

== See also ==
- Military history of the Acadians
- History of New Brunswick
- Military history of the Maliseet people
