= Benoni Danks =

Canadian politician

- Born: c. 1716; Northampton, Massachusetts Bay
- Died: 1776 (aged 59–60) Windsor, Nova Scotia
- Allegiance: Great Britain; United States
- Service years: 1756–1762, 1776
- Commands: Danks' Rangers
- Conflicts: French and Indian War; Expulsion of the Acadians; Cape Sable Campaign; Petitcodiac River campaign; St. John River campaign; Siege of Quebec; Siege of Havana; American Revolutionary War; Battle of Fort Cumberland
- Spouse: Mary Morris (m. 1745)

Benoni Danks (c. 1716 – 1776) was a New England soldier and politician who acted as the representative of Cumberland County in the Nova Scotia House of Assembly from 1765 to 1770. He is best known as the commander of Danks' Rangers, a unit which operated during the French and Indian War against the French.

== Biography ==
Benoni Danks was born in Northampton, Massachusetts, the son of Robert Danks and Rebecca Rust. In 1745, he married Mary Morris. He first commanded a ranger company during the Seven Years' War. His company operated in the Chignecto area during the Petitcodiac River Campaign and later the St. John River Campaign as part of the French and Indian War. He was active against the French and their native allies—for the most part the Mi'kmaq. In 1756 his company, men raised mainly in New England, was expanded and became an independent ranger unit —often referred to as Danks' Rangers.

The company was active between 1756 and 1762, when it was disbanded. It averaged about 100 men. The unit was based out of Fort Cumberland on the Isthmus of Chignecto, and frequently skirmished with Mi'kmaq and Acadian raiders before and during the French and Indian War. It is alleged that his unit turned in the scalps of Acadians for bounties, falsely claiming that they were from natives. The rangers carried out raids against French settlers on the Petitcodiac River and also participated in the siege of Quebec.

The unit suffered heavy casualties in the skirmishing around the edges of the siege, and for a time, after Danks was seriously wounded, were incorporated into the ranger company of Captain Moses Hazen. In 1761, he was granted land in Cumberland County. His company often operated in tandem with Gorham's Rangers, based out of Halifax, and after 1761, the two companies were combined into a Nova Scotia ranging corps, led by Major Joseph Gorham. As part of this corps, Danks and his company took part in the Siege of Havana in 1762, where, according to Israel Putnam, he sold his commission in the rangers. Two years later, Danks was named a justice of the peace and militia commander for Cumberland County. In 1767, he was named collector of duties on alcohol, tea, coffee and playing cards. Sympathetic to the American Revolution, Danks was captured after taking part in the Battle of Fort Cumberland led by Jonathan Eddy and died at Windsor, Nova Scotia from an infected wound.

He is probably the namesake of Danks Point in Baie Verte, New Brunswick.
