= Gorham's Rangers =

- Active: 1744–1762
- Country: Great Britain
- Allegiance: British Crown
- Branch: Provincial troops: Rangers
- Type: Reconnaissance, Counter-insurgency, and Light Infantry
- Role: Reconnaissance, counter-insurgency, amphibious and light infantry operations
- Size: One Company
- Garrison/HQ: Annapolis Royal (1744–1749); Halifax (1749–1762)
- Engagements: King George's War: Siege of Annapolis Royal (1744); Siege of Annapolis Royal (1745); Father Le Loutre's War: Battle at Chignecto (1749); Siege of Grand Pre (1749); Battle at St. Croix (1750); Battle at Chignecto (1750); French and Indian War: Battle of Fort Beauséjour (1755); Expulsion of the Acadians (1755-63); Bay of Fundy Campaign (1755); Louisbourg Expedition (1757); Cape Sable Campaign (1758); St. John River Campaign (1758-59); Petitcodiac River Campaign (1758); Siege of Louisbourg (1758); Battle of Quebec (1759); Battle of Havana (1762)

Commanders
- Notable commanders: Captain John Gorham; Major Joseph Gorham; Lieutenant William Bourne

Gorham's Rangers was one of the most famous and effective ranger units raised in colonial North America. Formed by John Gorham, the unit served as the prototype for many subsequent ranger forces, including the better known Rogers' Rangers. The unit started out as a Massachusetts provincial company, which means it was not part of the province's normal militia system. Recruited in the summer of 1744 at the start of King George's War, Governor William Shirley ordered the unit raised as reinforcements for the then-besieged British garrison at Fort Anne in Annapolis Royal. The unit was primarily used to secure British control in Nova Scotia, whose population consisted primarily of hostile French Acadian and Mi'kmaq. Initially a sixty-man all-Indian company led by British officers, the original Native American members of the unit were gradually replaced by Anglo-Americans and recent Scots and Irish immigrants and were a minority in the unit by the mid-1750s. The company were reconnaissance experts as well as renowned for their expertise at both water-borne operations and frontier guerrilla warfare. They were known for surprise amphibious raids on Acadian and Mi'kmaq coastal or riverine settlements, using large whaleboats, which carried between ten and fifteen rangers each. This small unit was the main British military force defending Nova Scotia from 1744 to 1749. The company became part of the British Army and was expanded during the Seven Years' War and went on to play an important role in fighting in Nova Scotia as well as participating in many of the important campaigns of the war, particularly distinguishing itself at the Siege of Quebec in 1759.

== King George's War ==
Gorham's Rangers was a Massachusetts provincial auxiliary company of New England Indians (mainly Wampanoag and Nauset, but also a few Pigwacket) led by Anglo-American officers and commanded by Captain John Gorham. The company was recruited in the late-spring / early summer of 1744 after Nova Scotia Lieutenant-Governor Paul Mascarene wrote to Massachusetts governor William Shirley requesting military aid. The force was sent to the relief of Annapolis Royal. They were accompanied by several regular provincial Infantry companies and arrived in Nova Scotia in September 1744. Their presence helped lift the siege of the beleaguered Fort Anne by Acadian and Mi'kmaq forces. The Indian members of the company were offered bounties for Mi'kmaq scalps and prisoners as part of their pay, and in December they pressured Gorham to return to New England to claim the bounty money for the scalps and prisoners they had taken. While in New England in February 1745, Gorham was commissioned a lieutenant colonel and given second-in-command of his father's regiment, the 7th Massachusetts Infantry, which took part in the Siege of Louisbourg in the late spring and early summer of 1745. The rangers apparently stayed behind in the Annapolis Basin and used Goat Island, a small islet off Annapolis Royal, as their base of operations. Mi'kmaq, Abenaki, and Huron Indians, supposedly aided by Acadian raiders, surprised the garrison on the island in May 1745. In the raid they captured nine Indian rangers and the Anglo-American crew members of two supply schooners moored at the island and took the prisoners to Quebec. Some were imprisoned in the city while others were forcibly adopted into various Indian villages around Quebec. A few were later released, at least one was exchanged for a French prisoner, while two chose to remain in the Abenaki communities they were now a part of. Gorham stayed in Louisburg through the spring of 1746 before returning to Annapolis and leading the rangers in a series of small expeditions against the Mi'kmaq and skirmishes with Acadians over the next several years. By the end of this period the unit was a fraction of its former size. Though accidents, disease, casualties, and captivity, only about a third of the original recruits remained. The next year, in 1747, Gorham traveled to England for an audience with King George II, who granted him a commission and approved the expansion of the unit, now part of the British Army, and tasked it with protecting British interests in Nova Scotia. Between 1747 and 1749, with the support of two armed sloops provided by Gorham himself, this company was largely responsible for the defense of British possessions in Nova Scotia, and counter-insurgency campaigns against the Acadians and their Indian allies.

== Father Le Loutre's War ==
At the outbreak of Father Le Loutre's War, Gorham's Rangers was the main force utilized to suppress this rebellion. Not merely a combat unit, both John and Joseph Gorham, as well as their Pigwacket adjutant Captain Sam (see personnel list below), took part in high-level diplomatic negotiations with Le Loutre, various Mi'kmaq chiefs, and Acadian leaders who were hostile to the British. After the new Royal governor arrived, Edward Cornwallis, he established a new capital for Nova Scotia at what became Halifax. It is at this point that Gorham's unit moved its base of operations from Annapolis Royal to the new headquarters. Further, the company was involved in the establishment of Fort Sackville (Nova Scotia) and Fort Edward (Nova Scotia). After John Gorham's death in 1751, command of the unit went to his brother, Lieutenant Joseph Gorham.

In 1750, at least six independent companies of rangers were organized in Nova Scotia, all modeled on Gorham's Rangers, although they contained mainly Anglo-Americans recruited in New England. The rangers at this point were described wearing coats of blue broadcloth. However, in 1755 a French intelligence report described Gorham's company as wearing "grey, cross pocket, with small leather caps or hats. (Note: Rene Chartrand suggests in Colonial American Troops 1610-1774 (3)) The company had very different uniforms depending on the time period in question. (Note: Kronoskaf.com has additional information on the uniforms worn and equipment used by the company throughout its nineteen-year history.) No contemporary images of Gorham's Rangers are known to exist.

== French and Indian War ==
A Nova Scotia ranger (left) in 1755

During the Seven Years' War, now led by Joseph Gorham, the company not only played an important role in fighting in Nova Scotia, but it also participated in many of the important campaigns of the war. Throughout 1755 to 1760, when not assigned elsewhere, they were central players in Britain's efforts to quell a low-level insurgency in Nova Scotia, fought by the Mi'kmaq Indians as well as Acadians. The rangers also took an active part in the expulsion of the Acadians, the forced removal of Catholic French settlers (Acadians) from Acadia due to their refusal to swear loyalty to the Crown. Protestant settlers from New England were granted now-vacant territories in Nova Scotia after the expulsion. (Note: The religious and ethnic dimensions of the expulsion were on top of, and deeply connected to, the perceived military exigencies cited as causes for the expulsions. There is significant evidence in the correspondence of military officers and politicians for rabid anti-Catholicism. Jack Mack, writes, "The first session of the Nova Scotia Assembly . . . passed a series of laws intended to institutionalize Acadian dispossession" including an act titled "An Act for the Quieting of Possessions to Protestant Grantees of land formerly occupied by the French." In it and two subsequent acts Anglicanism was made the official religion. These acts granted certain political rights to Protestants while the new laws excluded Catholics from public office and voting and forbid Catholics from owning land in the province. It also empowered the colonial authorities to seize all "popish" property (Church lands) for the Crown and barred Catholic clergy from entering or residing in the province. In addition to other anti-Catholic measures, Faragher concludes "These laws--passed by a popular assembly, not enacted by military fiat--laid the foundation for the migration of Protestant settlers." Even before the expulsion the colonial authorities were incredibly hostile to Catholics in Nova Scotia. In the 1740s William Shirley hoped to assimilate Acadians into the Protestant fold. He did so by trying to encourage Acadian women to marry Protestants and statutes were passed requiring the offspring of such unions be sent to English-language schools and raised as "English Protestants" (quote from letter by Shirley). This was linked to larger anxieties in the realm over the loyalty of Catholics in general--as Charles Stuart's Jacobite Rebellion was a Catholic-led rebellion as was Le Loutre's rebellion in Nova Scotia. Shirley, who in part was responsible for the Removals, according to historian Geoffery Plank, "recommended using military force to expel the most 'obnoxious' Acadians and replace them with Protestant immigrants. In time the Protestants would come to dominate their new communities." Shirley wanted "peaceable [loyal] subjects" and specifically, in his own words, "good Protestant ones.")

They also took part in the assault of Fort Beaujesour in 1755. In 1757, at the end of July, the company scouted French-occupied Louisbourg in anticipation of Lord Loudoun's (aborted) attack on the fortress. Gorham's men dressed as Acadian fishermen and sailed a captured fishing vessel rechristened "His Majesty's Schooner Monckton" directly into the harbor at night. Eventually a French warship fired on them, but the intelligence they gathered, about the arrival of a French fleet and reinforcements, was the deciding factor in Loudoun abandoning the assault. They played an important role in the initial amphibious assault at the outset of the second siege of Louisbourg in 1758, and were vital in the petite guerre and scorched-earth operations that took place around the periphery of the siege of Quebec in 1759. In 1761, the unit was officially placed on the British army establishment. The next year they took part in the expedition to Cuba where almost half of the corps died from tropical disease. The unit was disbanded shortly after the capitulation of Havana, and the remaining rangers were drafted into depleted British regiments.

Throughout most of the Seven Years' War, Gorham's rangers were based out of Halifax, but they often operated in tandem with a sister unit, stationed at Fort Cumberland on the Isthmus of Chignecto. This sister company, modeled on Gorham's unit, was commanded by Captain Benoni Danks, and is often referred to as "Danks' Rangers." The companies were combined in 1761 into a Nova Scotia ranging corps of which Joseph Gorham was Major Commandant. Both companies numbered between ninety and one hundred men throughout the war, although Gorham's company was augmented for the siege of Quebec to 125 men. Dank's company was raised to the same size for the expedition to Havana. When combined, the ranger corps fielded 253 men for the expedition. Of those 122 (48.2%) died, including eight officers.

The corps was officially disbanded in 1763.

== Unit composition ==
=== 1744–1749 ===
Initially the rangers were a sixty-man all-Indian unit led by British colonial officers and non-commissioned officers. The unit was captained by the politically well-connected and ambitious John Gorham III (1709-1751), who, prior to leading the rangers, had been a whaling captain and merchant from Yarmouth, Massachusetts, a small coastal town on Cape Cod. While his family had historically played an important role in colonial New England's military affairs, besides basic militia training in conventional warfare, Gorham had no prior ranger training or experience at frontier warfare. Nor did the company's junior officers, most of whom were his relatives. In the early days of the company's first deployment the officers learned their trade from the many veteran Native American soldiers who made up the company's rank and file. Most of the forty-eight privates were Wampanoag and Nauset Indians from Cape Cod. Some had served in Indian ranger companies twenty years earlier during Governor Dummer's War (1722-1726), a regional conflict the colonies of Massachusetts and New Hampshire fought against the Abenaki and other members of the Wabanaki Confederacy in Maine. Most of these Indian soldiers were also indentured servants who crewed whaleboats in the region's shore whaling industry or had been crew members on early Yankee whaleships. A small contingent of six Pequawket Indians from the Saco River region of Maine also joined the company, several of whom were likewise veteran warriors. These included a man British colonists called "Captain Sam" (probably the Pequawket sachem mentioned in French records as Jérôme Atecuando). Captain Sam served as the company's primary guide, translator and negotiator.

After three years in the field, the company was much reduced, with Gorham himself noting that almost three quarters of the original Indian members had been killed, captured, or died from disease. Almost moribund, the company was down to just twenty-one men by mid-1747. However, later that year Gorham traveled to England and convinced his superiors there that the company should be adopted into the British army. This new-found support allowed for the company to be expanded and new recruits added, bringing it back up to full strength. A muster roll from February 1748 shows a revived company of sixty-five rangers, with Native Americans, still the preferred recruits, making up almost two thirds of the complement.

=== 1749–1756 ===
Gorham's Rangers was much expanded during these years, with the company increasing in size to a peak of 114 men by the summer of 1749, and averaging between 90 and 95 men through the mid-1750s. Native American men continued to serve in the unit, but during this period recruits were increasingly Anglo-Americans. A partial muster roll from January 1750, showing about half of the unit that was sent on a mission to capture Acadians at Minas, reveals that Native Americans were less than one third of the detachment. By 1749-50, John Gorham, deeply in debt from using his own money to fund the company, was forced to travel to England to seek reimbursement. While pleading his case in London he contracted smallpox and died in December 1751. Joseph Gorham, now appointed commander, clearly preferred Indian soldiers to Anglo-American or British recruits as he tried to reverse the trend towards Anglicization by exchanging white rangers from the company for Indian soldiers serving in various companies of the two New England battalions sent to Nova Scotia in the spring of 1755 (which contained approximately eighty native men). At least thirteen Indians were transferred into Gorham's Rangers from just three companies in the first battalion, commanded by Lt. Col. John Winslow. Possibly more were transferred over from the second battalion, led by Lt. Col. George Scott.

=== 1756–1762 ===
By the mid-1750s, most of the original Indian members of Gorham's Rangers had long since been killed in combat, deserted, been captured, died from disease, or had chosen not to reenlist. While Indians from southern New England continued to be recruited for the company as late as 1761, and they remained a core element of the unit, most new members of the company in the Seven Years' War were Anglo-Americans or recent Scots or Irish immigrants to America. The company continued to average between 90 and 95 men in size, but was augmented to 125 (possibly as high as 150) for the Siege of Quebec. However, casualty rates were high for the unit at Quebec as near constant skirmishing around the edges of the encampments with Canadian militia and French-allied Indians from May through September winnowed the unit down significantly. There were as few as sixty rangers fit for duty in the company by September. Men from other ranger companies (from Roger's Ranger corps) as well as provincial troops were transferred into the unit to augment its numbers—further increasing the percentage of Anglo-Americans and Europeans in the company. And yet while Indians gradually dwindled to a small minority within the company, the unit nevertheless continued to utilize the same tactics pioneered by the original Wampanaog, Nauset and Pequawket members in the 1740s, which were taught by the Gorhams to other Anglo-American and British commanders as well as rank and file troops. Dank's Rangers likewise contained some New England Indians, but nowhere near as many as served in Gorham's company. Perhaps no more than a half dozen or so total served in Dank's unit.

== Recent scholarship ==
Scholarship on Gorham's Rangers frequently perpetuates a long-standing myth that the company was initially made up of Mohawks from New York or Métis from Canada. Recent scholarship disproves this and found that after reviewing surviving muster rolls and other documents relating to the company, not a single Iroquois can be documented as having served in the company. Indeed, the Indians listed as serving in the unit, aside from the few Pequawket members who were from Maine, were clearly Wampanoag and Nauset Indians from Cape Cod. This can be corroborated by comparing the men's names with census records kept by missionary societies, and deeds, probates, and vital records from Barnstable County in the 18th century, as well as from John Gorham's own writings. These records reveal most of these men hailed from the Indian communities at Mashpee, Herring Pond, Yarmouth and elsewhere on the Cape, in addition to Aquinnah on Martha's Vineyard, as well as a few other nearby southeastern New England Indian communities (Natick, Mashantucket, Mohegan, Niantic, etc.)

== Notable Members ==
[Note: This is not a complete listing of members of the company]

Colonial Englishmen & Other Europeans:

=== Officers ===
- Captain John Gorham (lieut.-colonel in Mass. provincial forces)
- Major Joseph Gorham
- Captain-Lieutenant Edward Watmough (lieut. 1750, capt.-lieut. 1759-1762) from England
- Lieutenant William Bourne (cousin of Gorhams, lieut. 1747-ca. 1751)
- Lieutenant John Phillips (surgeon 1750-1756)
- Lieutenant James Bean (of York, Maine, expert in Wabanaki languages, 1757-1761) (Note: Died in 1761)
- Lieutenant William Shipton (1758-1762) [Died Havana, 1762]
- Lieutenant Elisha Waterman (1758-1762) [Died Havana, 1762]
- Lieutenant Christopher Gorham (son of John Gorham, 1761-1762) (Note: Gorham was a 'gentleman volunteer in the company in 1758, before being commissioned in 1761.) [Died Havana, 1762]
- Lieutenant Edward Crosby (1762)
- Lieutenant James Johnston (promoted from Sgt. Major, Havana, 1762)
- Lieutenant Joseph Heyland (promoted from H.M.S. Namur, Havana, 1762)
- 2nd Lieutenant William Howe (1759-1762) [Died Havana, 1762]
- Ensign Matthew Wilmett [Wilmott?] (1747-1748)
- Ensign Thomas Moncrieff (Irish officer, 1749–50, later Major, 1775) (Note: Lieut. in Gorham's Rangers by 1754 and later he was in the 59th Regiment of Foot. Richard Bulkeley Senr. excepted, Moncrieffe was the only charter member of The Charitable Irish Society of Halifax also to have come to Nova Scotia with Governor Edward Cornwallis in 1749. In the 59th regiment he fought under Thomas Gage in Boston during the American Revolution. He later returned to Halifax.)
- Doctor Abraham Dupee (surgeon ca. 1759-1762) [Died Havana, 1762]
- John Gorham IV (son of John Gorham, company clerk in 1749-50)

=== Non-Commissioned Officers ===
- Sergeant Thomas Bray (1746)
- Sergeant Ebenezer Hawes (1746)
- Sergeant Philip Richardson (1748)
- Sergeant John Berry (1748)
- Sergeant John Dunn (1748)
- Sergeant James Spranger [Springer?] (1748)
- Sergeant Jonathan Clarke (1757-led detachment of six rangers)
- Corporal Joshua Newcomb (1748)
- Corporal James Richardson (1748)
- Corporal Mark McGrath (1748)
- Ensign William Smith

=== Enlisted Men ===
- Drummer Lucas Dunn (1748)
- George Lewis ("boatmaster" in 1750)
- Nathaniel Freeman ("boatmaster" in 1750)
- Jonathan Stewart ("boatmaster" in 1750)
- Cornelius Cavanaugh (Irish immigrant, in rangers in 1750s)
- Patrick Henry (Irish immigrant, in rangers 1757-1761)
- John Hall (Irish immigrant, enlisted at New London, CT in 1760)
- Nevell Brand (of Yarmouth, MA, enlisted at Barnstable, MA in 1759)
- Benjamin Braggs (of Norwich, CT, enlisted at Norwich in 1759)

=== Native Americans ===
- Captain Sam [a.k.a. Jérôme Atecuando] - Pequawket sachem
- Sabbatis - Pequawket
- Keysor - Pequawket
- Corporal Jeremy Queach - Nauset
- John Simons [Simmons]- Teticut Wampanoag preacher (Note: J. Simons was the unit's unofficial chaplain ca. 1749-1752)
- Joseph Ralph - Nauset village leader
- Peter Dogamus - Nauset (Note: Dogamus was held captive among Huron at Lorette, 1745-1750.)
- Joseph Twiney - Nauset
- Job Manasses - Nauset
- Amos Sipson - Nauset
- David Dick - Nauset
- Sam Achoho - Nauset
- James Francis - Nauset
- James Queach - Nauset
- Nehemiah [a.k.a. 'Miah'] Cowett - Nauset (Note: Or possibly Herring Pond or Teticut Wampanoag.)
- Moses George [a.k.a. Moses Ned] - Nauset
- Jacob Chammock - Herring Pond Wampanoag (Note: Held captive in Quebec, 1745-1747.)
- John Cowett - Herring Pond Wampanoag
- Joseph Moses - Herring Pond Wampanoag preacher (Note: Resided at 'Monument Ponds', today in Bourne, MA.)
- Joseph Pepeneu - Herring Pond Wampanoag preacher (Note: Resided at Coonamessett, today in Falmouth, MA.)
- Joseph Beachgrass - Herring Pond / Mashpee Wampanoag
- Peter Will - Mashpee Wampanoag (Note: Taken captive by Androscoggin Abenaki in 1745, later settled among Abenaki.)
- Caleb Popmonet - Mashpee Wampanoag (Note: Taken captive by Androscoggin Abenaki in 1745.)
- Caesar Barnabus - Mashpee Wampanoag
- Jon Peter [Jonathan Peters] - Masphee Wampanoag
- ---- Webquish - Mashpee Wampanoag (Note: Taken captive by Androscoggin Abenaki in 1745. Described in Mass. government documents as being a prisoner among the Abenaki in the late 1740s. There were at least six men with this surname among the Mashpee in the 1730s-1750s who could possibly be this individual: John, Philip, Evan, Noah, Esaw and Ezekiel. Evidence also suggests, whoever he was, that he was later released and returned to Mashpee.)
- James Kiah - Mashpee Wampanoag
- Daniel Atiquin - Mashpee Wampanoag
- Daniel Tacouse (Note: Spelling of this name varies widely in records: Takouse, Takoose, Tacoose, etc.) - Aquinnah Wampanoag
- Thomas Tockanot - Aquinnah Wampanoag
- Eliakim Nehoman - Aquinnah Wampanoag
- Isaac Peck - Wampanoag (Note: Taken captive by and later settled among the St. Francis Abenaki.)
- Peter Washanks - Wampanoag
- Abraham Speen - Natick leader
- Jonathan Babysuck - Natick
- John Womsquam - Natick
- Joshua Uncas - Mohegan
- Pharaoh Gardner - Pequot
- Sam Pharaoh - Montauk (Note: A Samuel Pharaoh, presumably a Montauk--the surname Pharaoh is very common among the tribe, enlisted in the Connecticut militia sent to relieve Fort William Henry in 1757. He enlisted in the Connecticut provincial forces, in a company recruited in and around Norwalk, Connecticut two years later in 1759.)

Identified as Indian in company records from 1746-1748 but tribal/village affiliation unclear (most likely Wampanoag or Nauset):

- Jacob Cowett
- Sam Robin (of Bridgewater, MA?)
- Moses Elimas
- Robin Sturgis (of Yarmouth, MA?)
- Richard Stephen (Nauset or Mashpee?)
- Thomas George
- James Tom (Cape Cod?)
- Simon Abraham (Herring Pond or Natick?)
- David Elimas

=== Africans ===
- Limus Coffin (from Yarmouth, MA, African-born former slave of Col. Shubael Gorham, father of John and Joseph)

== See also ==
- Danks' Rangers
- William Shirley
- Paul Mascarene
- Charles Lawrence
- Benoni Danks
- Robert Rogers
- George Scott (army officer)
- Silvanus Cobb
- Wampanoag
- Nauset
- Pequawket
- Military history of Nova Scotia
- Military history of the Mi’kmaq People
- Military history of the Acadians

== Bibliography ==
- Anderson, Fred, Crucible of War: The Seven Years' War and the Fate of Empire in British North America, 1754-1766 (Vintage Books, 2001).
- Lee, Wayne E., Empires and Indigenes: Intercultural Alliance, Imperial Expansion, and Warfare in the Early Modern World (NYU Press, 2011).
- Lee, Wayne E., "Subjects, Clients, Allies, or Mercenaries? The British use of Irish and Amerindian military power, 1500-1815," in Britain's Oceanic Empire: Atlantic and Indian Ocean Worlds, c. 1550-1850 eds. H.V. Bowen, Elizabeth Mancke, and John G. Reid (Cambridge University Press, 2012).
