= Battle of Petitcodiac =

1755 battle during the French and Indian War

Coordinates: 45.92296°N 64.64546°W

- Part of the French and Indian War
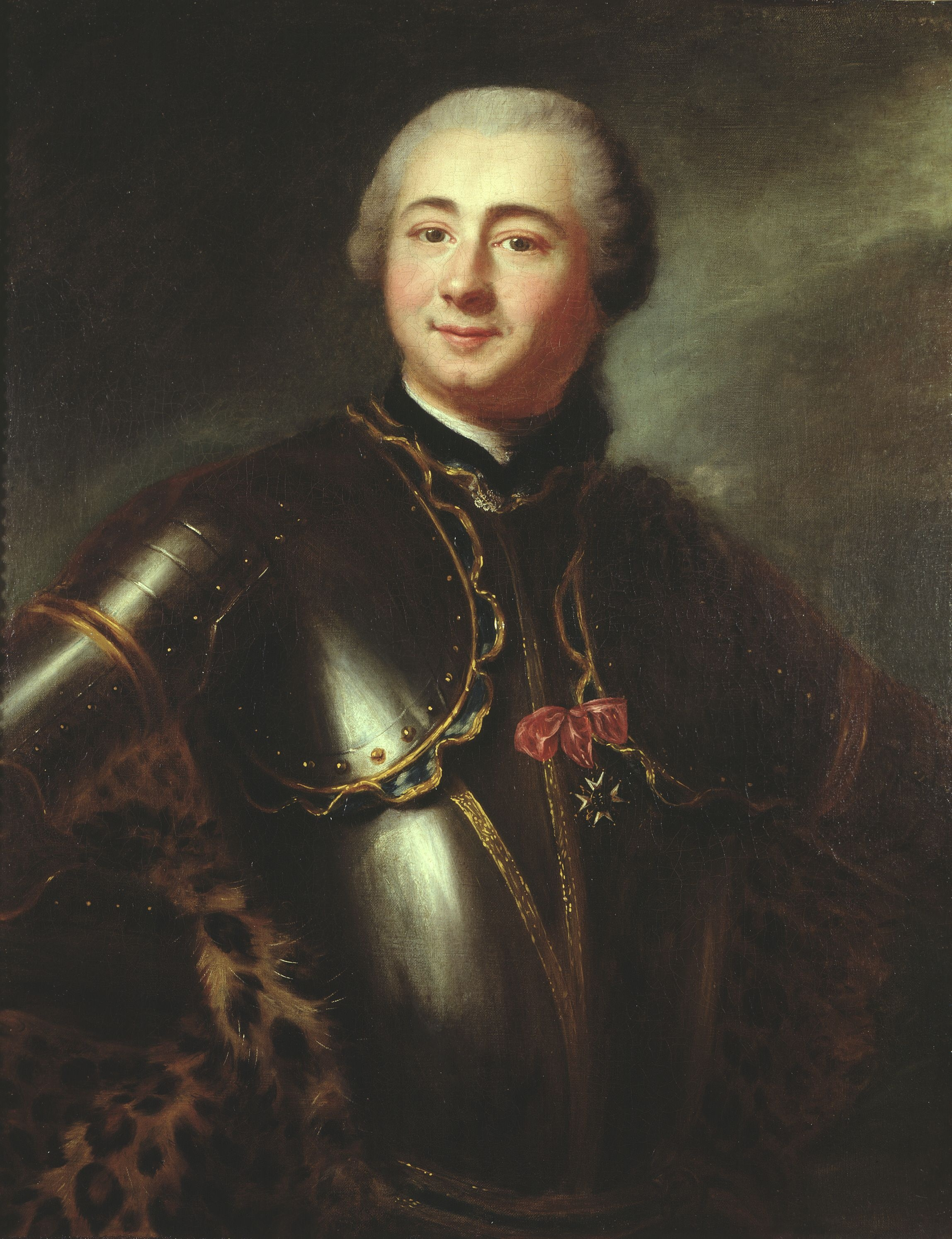
- A portrait of Charles Deschamps de Boishébert et de Raffetot
Date	September 4, 1755
Location	Village-des-Blanchard, Acadia
Result	French-Indian victory

Belligerents
France; New France; Mi'kmaq	Massachusetts

Commanders and leaders
Charles Deschamps de Boishébert et de Raffetot	Joseph Frye; Silvanus Cobb; Joseph Gorham

Strength
300	200

Casualties and losses
1 killed 3 wounded	22-42 killed 6 wounded 45 captured

The Battle of Petitcodiac was an engagement which occurred during the Bay of Fundy campaign of the French and Indian War. The battle was fought between the British colonial forces from Massachusetts and Acadian militiamen led by French officer Charles Deschamps de Boishébert et de Raffetot on September 4, 1755. It took place at the Acadian village of Village-des-Blanchard on the Petitcodiac River.

== Background ==
After the capture of Fort Beauséjour in June 1755 during the French and Indian War, the British initiated a campaign to deport the Acadians, French colonizers in Acadia. Using Fort Cumberland as a base, British forces made forays into the surrounding countryside, rounding up Acadians to deport and destroying their colonial settlements. Some of the Acadians surrendered, while others fled from the coastal communities into the interior, where they joined with local Miꞌkmaq and Maliseet forces and resisted the deportation efforts.

Charles Deschamps de Boishébert et de Raffetot was a French militia commander who became a leader in the resistance to the deportation. Based in the Miramichi River valley, he helped Acadians fleeing the deportation operations escape to Quebec. After the capture of Fort Beauséjour, Robert Monckton sent a naval squadron to evict him from the satellite fort at the mouth of the Saint John River. Knowing that he could not defend his position, Boishebert and his men destroyed the fort. When he received word that the British were planning an expedition to the Petitcodiac River, he hurried to Chipoudy, where he organized 120 Acadians, Maliseets and Mi'kmaq into a guerilla force.

During Bay of Fundy campaign, on August 28, Monckton sent Major Joseph Frye with an expedition of 200 provincial militia from Fort Cumberland in two armed sloops, with instructions to clear Acadians settlements on the Petitcodiac River. After setting the buildings on fire at Shepody, New Brunswick, they began moving up the river, torching settlements and taking prisoners along the way.

== Battle ==
On September 2, Frye's expedition began these clearing operations on settlements in and around the Village-des-Blanchard. While the main body worked on the eastern bank of the river, a detachment of between fifty and sixty militiamen under John Indicot was despatched to the western bank. When they set fire to the village church, Boishébert and three hundred men attacked. Indicot's men retreated behind a dyke and were in a near panic when Frye landed with the remainder of the force and took command. After three hours of spirited fighting, Frye eventually extracted the force to the boats and retreated. Twenty-two provincial militiamen were killed and another six were wounded. Ranger Joseph Gorham was wounded in the battle.

== Aftermath ==
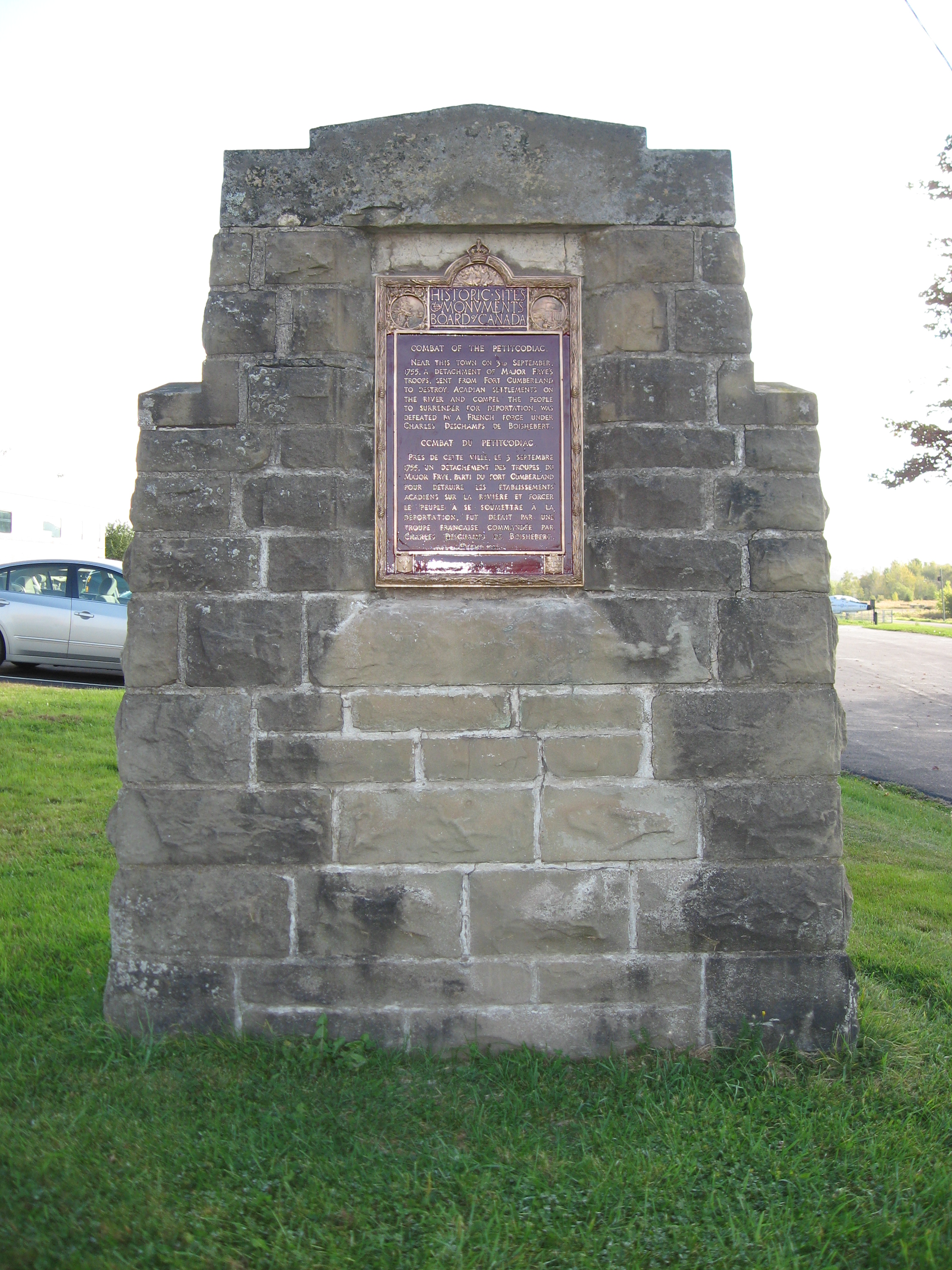
The site of the battle is marked by the Battle of Petitcodiac National Historic Event monument.

The battle was a stinging defeat for Frye's forces. Abbe Le Guerne wrote that it "made the English tremble more than all the cannons of Beausejour." For many in the provincial militia, this was their first experience with combat and over 50 percent of those who participated became casualties. The battle was the first French military success in Acadia during the war. Boishébert rescued thirty captive Acadian families and captured large quantities of military supplies and food. He subsequently created an Acadian refugee camp known as "Camp de l'Espérance" on Beaubears Island near present-day Miramichi, New Brunswick. The Acadians also managed to reach camps in Chaleur Bay and the Restigouche River.

On the Restigouche River, Boishébert created another refugee camp at Petit-Rochelle. Boishebert again led Acadian forces during the Battle of the Plains of Abraham. The British would return three years later to destroy the village in the 1758 Petitcodiac River campaign. The site is marked by a plaque from the national Historic Sites and Monuments Board. It is the earliest recognized National Historic Event in the country, having been designated on May 16, 1918, prior to the establishment of the Board.

== See also ==
- Military history of the Mi'kmaq people
- Military history of the Acadians
- History of New Brunswick
