= Roger Morris (British Army officer) =

British Army officer (1727–1794)

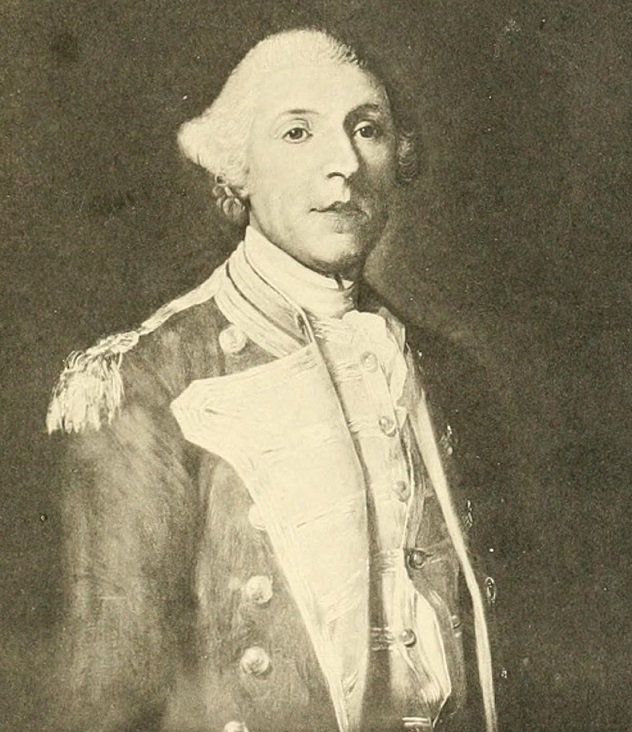
Portrait of Morris by Benjamin West

Lieutenant-Colonel Roger Morris (28 January 1727 – 13 September 1794) was a British Army officer who served in the French and Indian War. He was married to Mary Philipse, middle daughter of Frederick Philipse, second Lord of the Philipsburg Manor, and a possible love interest of George Washington. She owned a one-third share of the Philipse Patent, a vast landed estate on the Hudson River which later became Putnam County, New York.

Following their marriage Morris had a large country estate named Mount Morris (today the Morris-Jumel Mansion) built in northern Manhattan between the Hudson and Harlem rivers in what is now Washington Heights.

== Life and career ==
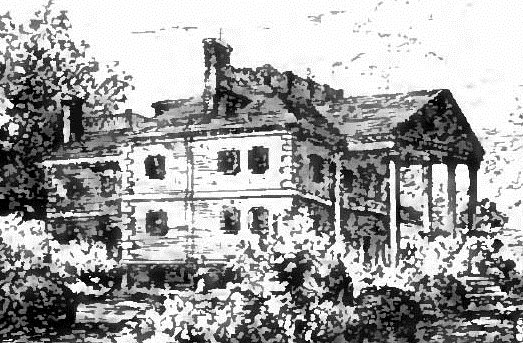
The Palladian style mansion built by Morris in northern Manhattan in 1765, the family home until the onset of the American Revolution in 1775. Seen here in 1892, after it had been altered with a Federal style entrance.

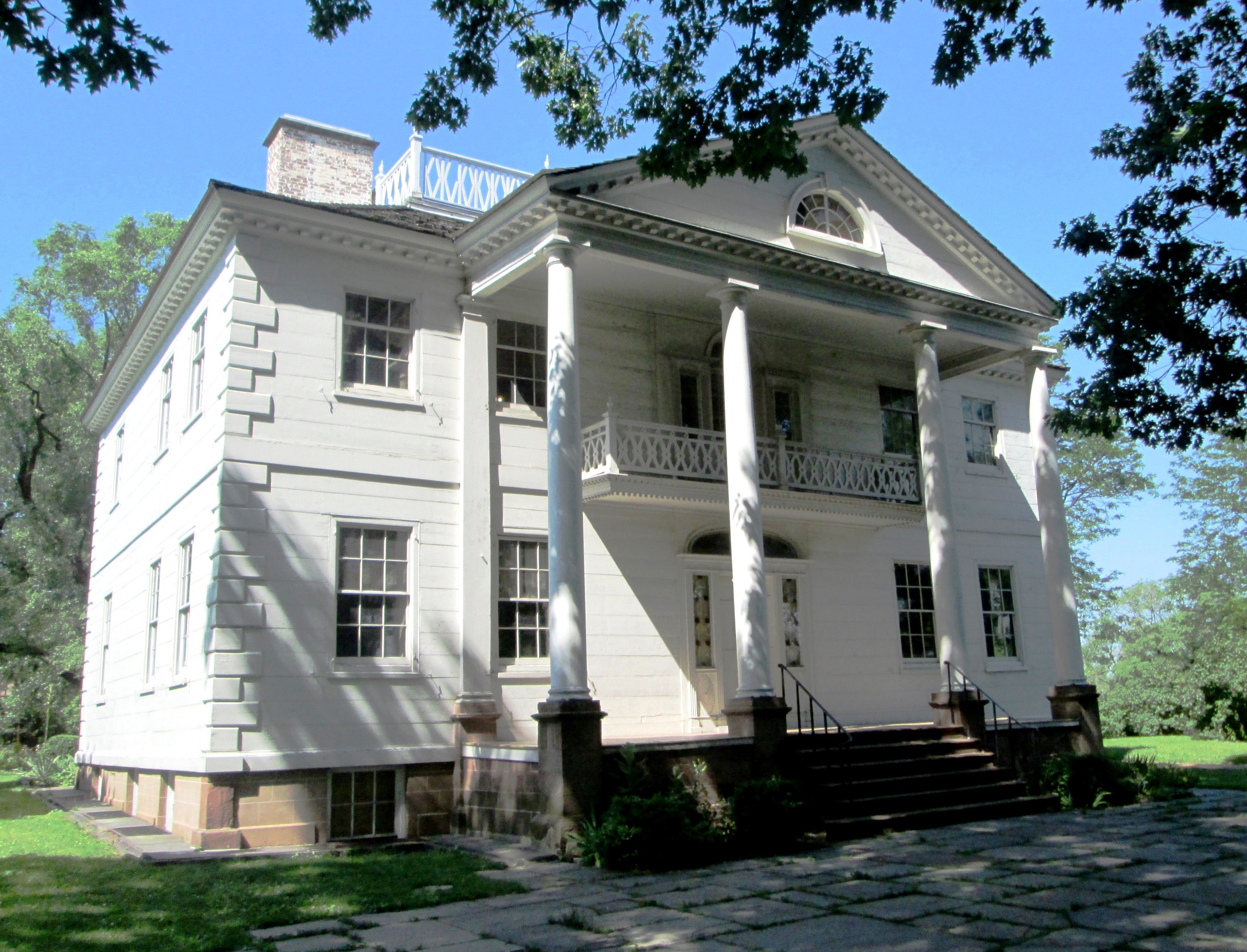
Mount Morris, today's Morris-Jumel Mansion

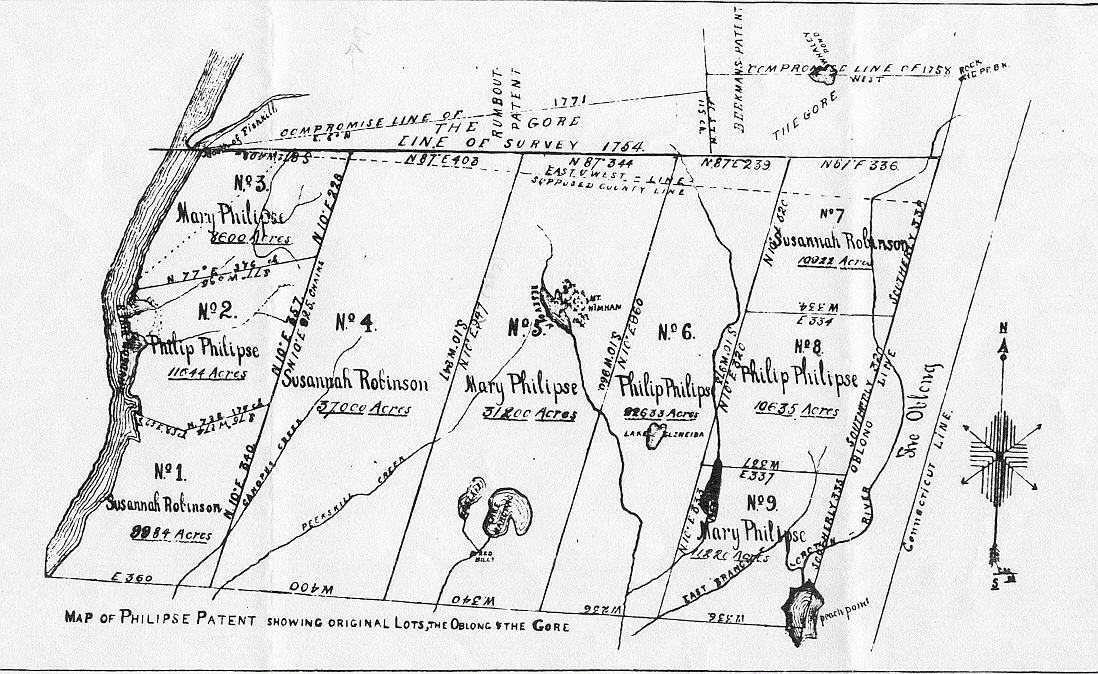
Map of the Philipse Patent showing the holdings of Philip, Susanna, and Mary Philipse

Morris was born in England on 28 January 1727, the third son of Roger Morris of Netherby, in the North Riding of Yorkshire, and Mary Jackson, the fourth daughter of Sir Peter Jackson.

On 13 September 1745, he obtained a commission in the 48th Regiment of Foot. The regiment served at Falkirk and Culloden, and in Flanders. Morris came to America with General Edward Braddock and served as his aide-de-camp. He was wounded during Braddock's Defeat in 1755 near Fort Duquesne in western Pennsylvania.

Transferred to the 35th Regiment of Foot in 1758, Morris served in Fort Frederick in Nova Scotia; he led the Cape Sable Campaign against the Acadians. Morris joined the Louisbourg Grenadiers, a special corps made up of the Grenadiers of the 22nd, 40th and 45th Regiments, during General James Wolfe's invasion of French Quebec where he participated in the Battle of the Plains of Abraham on 13 September 1759. During the siege of Louisbourg, Grenadiers suffered a loss of fifty-five killed and wounded. In May 1760, Morris was promoted to lieutenant-colonel of the 47th Regiment of Foot shortly after the Battle of Sainte-Foy, and participated in General Jeffery Amherst's assault and capture of Montreal on 8 September 1760 ending French rule in North America.

Morris retired from the British army in 1764 and settled in New York City on the southeast corner of Whitehall and Stone streets with his American wife, Mary Philipse, nicknamed Charming Polly, whom he had married in 1758. Middle daughter of Frederick Philipse, second Lord of the Philipsburg Manor, she had been a possible love interest of George Washington, (Note: See The Washington legend for excerpts of letters from Joseph Chew to Washington during 1756-1757 concerning "Polly" Philipse.) and owned a one-third share of the Philipse Patent, a vast landed estate on the Hudson River which later became Putnam County, New York.

Before wedding, a prenuptial agreement was composed that shared a life lease of the estate between husband and wife, transferred after their death to children. The Morrises became pillars of the local establishment since Roger Morris was appointed on the Governor's Council of the Province of New York. The following year after his marriage, Morris had a large country estate named Mount Morris (today the Morris-Jumel Mansion) built in northern Manhattan between the Hudson and Harlem rivers in what is now the Washington Heights neighborhood. Situated on Coogan's Bluff, its vista included lower Manhattan, the Hudson and its Palisades, the Bronx, Westchester, the Long Island Sound and the Harlem River.

== American Revolution ==
Morris and his family lived in Mount Morris from 1765 until 1775, when the American Revolution began. A Loyalist, Morris went to England at the start of the war, while his wife and family stayed at the family seat, Philipse Manor Hall, in Yonkers. Between 14 September – 20 October 1776, General George Washington used the Morris mansion as his temporary headquarters. It later served as the headquarters of British Lieutenant General Sir Henry Clinton, and the Hessian commander Baron Wilhelm von Knyphausen.

Morris returned to New York in 1777, after the city had been captured by the British, and became the Inspector of the Claims of Refugees in the rank of provincial colonel serving until 1783; he and his family left for England after the British defeat in the Revolution. In 1779, estates of 58 prominent Loyalists, including the Morris home and Mary's share of the Philipse Patent, were confiscated by the Commissioners of Forfeiture according to the Attainder Act of 1779 passed by the Third Session of the New York Legislature on 22 October 1779. These were later sold by auction along with Morris's plate and furniture without compensation despite assurance of restitution in the 1783 Treaty of Paris that Revolutionary representatives had signed with the British. (Note: Description of the Abstract of Sales, Commissioners of Forfeiture: "Article V of the peace treaty signed by Britain and the United States in Paris on September 3, 1783, insisted on the restitution of all estates, rights, and properties, which have been confiscated belonging to real British subjects and to noncombatant loyalists. Tories who fought the United States were to be given one year to reclaim their property and leave the country. Payments were to be made to loyalists whose estates had already been sold. Article VI prohibited any future confiscations." See: Proceedings of the Commissioners of Forfeiture Summary) As many citizens of New York, however, still harbored strong resentment against the loyalists, the Provincial Congress effectively nullified that article of the Treaty of Paris of 1783 by an act of 12 May 1784.

== After the war ==
It was subsequently shown in court that by prenuptial agreement the Morris share of the Philipse Patent was vested in their children and had not been reached by the bill of attainder. However, a gambit by millionaire John Jacob Astor provided something of a windfall for the Philipse-Morris heirs, but failed to bring him its desired long term rental income. In 1809 he bought the interest of the Morris heirs in their share of the Patent, Henry, Joanna, and Maria, for £20,000 sterling, payable upon their mother's death; he then brought suit against the State of New York. After Mary Philipse Morris died in 1825 Astor attempted to collect rents on the lands, but intermediate owners who had previously purchased lands from the New York Commission of Forfeiture refused to pay and Astor tried to evict them. A compromise was reached in 1828 when New York State agreed to compensate Astor for the reversionary rights, which, with costs, amounted to $561,500 when paid in 1832. (Note: In 1809, John Jacob Astor bought the interest of the heirs of Morris for this property for £20,000 and brought suit against the State. The State to protect those who held title from the Commissioners of Forfeiture, passed a law, April 16, 1827, directing 5 suits to be prosecuted to judgment in the Circuit Court of New York for review and final decision. If against the defendants, the State agreed to pay $450,000 in 5 per cent stock, redeemable at pleasure; and if the decision included improvements that had been made by occupants, $250,000 more. Three suits were tried, each resulting in favor of Astor; upon which the comptroller was, by act of April 5, 1832, directed to issue stock for the full amount, with costs. The amount issued was $561,500. Few suits have been tried in the State involving larger interests to greater numbers, or which were argued with more ability, than this. See: French's Gazetteer of the State of New York (1860))

Morris died in York, England on 13 September 1794, at age 77. His wife died in York at the age of 95. A monument is erected over their graves at St Saviour's Church there.

== Offspring ==
The Morrises had two sons, Amherst and Henry, and three daughters, Joanna, Maria, and Margaret, by the marriage.

Margaret died at age 2 in 1766.

The elder son, Amherst Morris, entered the Royal Navy, and was first lieutenant of the frigate HMS Nymphe, serving under Captain Sir Edward Pellew (later Viscount Exmouth), in her famous action with the French frigate La Cleopatre. He died in 1802.

The other son, Henry Gage Morris, also joined the Royal Navy, rising to the rank of rear-admiral. He afterwards resided at York and at Beverley, England. His son, Francis Orpen Morris, became a famous naturalist. Henry died at Beverley in 1852, and was buried in Beverley Minster.

When Amherst died in 1802 his share of the Highland Patent vested in the remaining three Morris offspring, Henry, Joanna, and Maria. Their interests in the legacy were bought out by John Jacob Astor in 1809 for £20,000 sterling.
