= William Stark (loyalist) =

- Born: 1 April 1724; Londonderry, New Hampshire, U.S.
- Died: 18 May 1782 (aged 58); Long Island, New York, U.S.
- Spouse: Mary Stinson Stark
- Children: William Stark Jr.; John Stark; Archibald Stark; Mary Stark; Stephen Stark; Thomas Stark; James Stark
- Relatives: John Stark
- Military career
- Allegiance: Kingdom of Great Britain
- Branch: Rogers' Rangers; Loyalist troops
- Service years: 1757–1758 and 1759 (Rogers Rangers); 1776 (Loyalists)
- Rank: Captain (Rogers Rangers); Lieutenant Colonel (Loyalists)
- Conflicts: Seven Years War (Rogers Rangers); Revolutionary War (Loyalists)

William Stark (1 April 1724 – 18 May 1782) was a Revolutionary War era officer. He was the brother of John Stark.

== Early life ==
Stark was born in Londonderry, New Hampshire. He was with his brother John Stark, David Stinson and Amos Eastman, hunting along the Baker River, a tributary of the Pemigewasset River, on 28 April 1752, when John Stark and Amos Eastman were captured and David Stinson was killed by Abenaki Indians. William escaped in his canoe after being warned by his brother.

== Career ==
During the French and Indian War Stark commanded a company of Rogers' Rangers in northern New York and Nova Scotia where he served under James Rogers. He took part in the assaults on Fortress Louisbourg in 1758, the St. John River Campaign and Battle of the Plains of Abraham in 1759, where he served as a Major for General James Wolfe. In the painting by Benjamin West titled "The Death of General Wolfe", Major William Stark is seen holding the mortally wounded General in cradle. Major William Stark was essential in the British triumph and was a pathfinder leading the Royal troops from riverside to the Field of Abraham, high above. Early in the American Revolution, Stark did not join the New Hampshire Militia forces in the Siege of Boston, but the sounds of the Battle of Bunker Hill could be heard at his home in Dunbarton, New Hampshire, and he left on his swiftest horse to fight, but he arrived too late and the battle had already ended.

Both General John Sullivan and Colonel Jonathan Moulton recommended Stark to command the new regiment being raised in New Hampshire for service with the Continental Army in the invasion of Canada, but the New Hampshire General Assembly gave the command to Timothy Bedel, a former subordinate of Stark's. Stark, feeling ill-used by his home state, left for New York City, which was occupied by the British Army, and offered his services to them. The British made him a lieutenant colonel of Loyalist troops.

Stark's property in New Hampshire was confiscated by the revolutionary government.

Rick Holmes, of Derry News 1 Aug 2013, Derry, New Hampshire wrote: "William Stark was born in 1724 in a small house on Stark Road in Derry. In the 1750s, William moved to Starktown – now Dunbarton, N.H. — where his house was used as the meeting house for the next 17 years. On the frontier, the Stark brothers soon gained a reputation as skilled hunters and trappers who ranged all over New Hampshire and Quebec. While hunting in 1754, they were ambush by Indians. William managed to escape but his brother was taken prisoner. John was taken to Montreal where he was eventually ransomed for $103 – the price of a pony. During the French and Indian War, William Stark was part of Rogers' Rangers – colonial America’s greatest fighting force. William Stark was appointed captain and was second in command to the legendary Robert Rogers himself. During the next few years, he fought with bravery in many battles from Fortress Louisbourg in Cape Breton to Fort Ticonderoga in New York. William frequently traveled with his dog Beau de Bien, who drew full soldiers pay because of services as a scout and guard. William was assigned to go with Gen. James Wolfe to attack the French-held city of Quebec. The general could find no way to attack the French army, which was secure on top of the impenetrable cliffs looming high above the St. Lawrence River. One historian purports that it was Major William Stark who told Wolfe of the hidden path to the top of the cliff. The English went on to win the battle but Gen. Wolfe was critically wounded. Stark was one of the four officers who were assigned to carry Wolfe away from the fighting. In Benjamin West’s famous painting, "The Death of General Wolfe", it is believed that it's William Stark cradling the dying general in a pose reminiscent of Christ in Michelangelo's "Pieta". This battle resulted in England taking control of all of Canada. It is considered one of the most important battles in world history. After Quebec, William returned to his farm high on a ridge in Dunbarton. Here for the next 16 years, the soldier was at peace; here he and his wife raised seven children and took part in small-town politics. During the morning of 17 April 1775, he was startled to hear the distant sounds of cannon fire coming from 70 miles away at Bunker Hill outside of Boston. Immediately, he grabbed his musket, jumped on his horse and rode toward the fighting. By the time he arrived, the battle was over and he joined his brother John in Medford. William Stark was solidly on the patriot side and soon applied for command of an army to protect the northern border and capture the city of Quebec. Because of his experiences in the French and Indian War there was no one who more qualified for that position then Stark. The New Hampshire government saw fit however to award the command to a politically connected soldier who had formerly been one of Stark's lieutenants. This act of disrespect and idiocy infuriated William Stark. He rode to the British line and became a colonel in the king's army. This action was very upsetting to his brother, patriot Gen. John Stark. When hearing about his brother leaving the state, John Stark said that leaving was "the best thing he ever did!” During the war William Stark served in the defense of New York City. The government of New Hampshire confiscated all of his property consisting of thousands of acres of farm and forest land."

== Death ==
Stark did not die from injuries he received in falling from his horse on Long Island, New York, during the Battle of Long Island. Stark's death has been incorrectly stated and perpetuated for some strange reason. Major Stark's Corps was raised starting in September 1776 and by May of 1777 consisted of 4 companies, 11 officers and 250 rank and file for his New Hampshire Volunteers. His regiment was disbanded by October of 1778 and he was put on the Second Officer list. He was on Half Pay when he died May 18, 1782 according to his son Lt. John Stark in his claim for compensation as heir of William's property which was confiscated by the New Hampshire assembly in April of 1778.

This can be verified from the United Kingdom Archives at Kew, Audit Office 13/52, 496-544.

See also American Migrations, 1765-1799. The lives, times and families of colonial Americans who remained loyal to the British Crown before, during and after the Revolutionary War, as related in their own words and through their correspondence. Jan. 4 2011, by Peter Wilson Coldham.

== Personal life ==
Stark was the son of Archibald and Eleanor Nichols Stark and the older brother of General John Stark, the hero of the Battle of Bennington. He married Mary Stinson on 22 February 1754 and they had seven children: William JR., John, Archibald, Mary, Stephen, Thomas, and James.
