= Silvanus Cobb =

Massachusetts provincial army captain

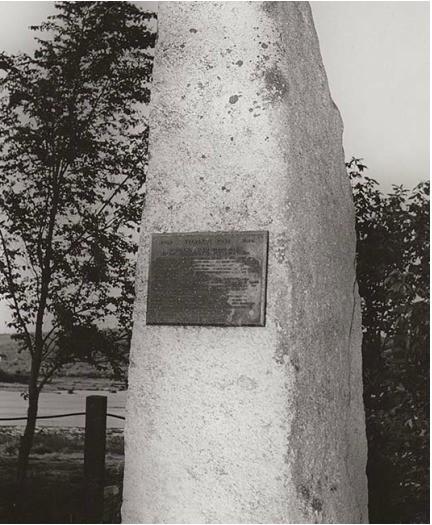
Silvanus Cobb Monument, Liverpool, Nova Scotia

Silvanus Cobb (Sylvanus Cobb) (b. Plymouth, New England in 1709 – d. Havana, 1762) was a Massachusetts provincial army captain and later naval commander who fought for the British primarily in Nova Scotia in the 1740s and 1750s.

== King George's War ==
During King George's War, Cobb was commissioned captain of a company in Col. Shubael Gorham's 7th Massachusetts provincial infantry regiment, also known as "the whaleboat regiment" because so many of its members were employed in the Cape Cod / Nantucket whaling industry and because of the whaleboats the regiment used during water-borne operations. The force was recruited from among the populations of Plymouth, Barnstable, and Bristol counties in southeastern Massachusetts in 1745 for the Expedition against Louisbourg. Gorham's regiment made up the majority of men who attacked the island battery in Louisbourg Harbor during the siege—suffering significant casualties in a series of failed amphibious assaults. Cobb probably took part in some or all of these attacks. He later commanded another provincial company stationed at the Annapolis Royal garrison at Fort Anne in Nova Scotia in 1746–47, and was later captain of a small armed vessel based there. The vessel was employed by the British government to cruise in the Bay of Fundy in 1747–48. The vessel was also often used as a transport and support vessel for Gorham's Rangers.

== Father Le Loutre's War ==
During Father Le Loutre's War, after the British established Halifax in 1749, Cobb's vessel became part of Captain John Rous's sea militia which helped keep open communications along the coast of Nova Scotia and with New England. Governor Edward Cornwallis described Cobb as a settler who "knows every Harbour and every Creek in the Bay [of Fundy], a man fit for any bold enterprise." Cobb was involved in a stand off at Saint John River in August 1750. Cobb's vessel was employed in taking troops and supplies to Fort Anne (Annapolis Royal), Fort Edward (Windsor), Fort Lawrence (near Amherst), and the Saint John River, and in convoying transports which carried German settlers to found the town of Lunenburg in 1753. In the winters of 1753, 1754, 1755, and 1756 he was ordered to Chignecto with stores for the garrison and remained there each year till spring. Cobb had a house and farm near Fort Lawrence where he lived with his wife and daughter.

In April 1755, while searching for a wrecked vessel at Port La Tour, Cobb discovered the French schooner Marguerite (Margarett), laden with provisions, guns, and other military stores from Louisbourg destined for French troops on the Saint John River. He returned to Halifax with the news and was ordered by Governor Charles Lawrence to blockade the harbour until Captain William Kensey arrived in the warship Vulture, and then to assist Kensey in capturing the French prize.

== French and Indian War ==
During the French and Indian War (the North American Theatre of the Seven Years' War), Cobb served at the second siege of Louisburgh under Boscowen and Amherst in 1758, and was chosen by General Monckton to conduct General Wolfe to a reconnaissance of the fortress previous to its capture. Afterward he participated in the St. John River Campaign and the Petitcodiac River Campaign.

Capt Cobb returned to Plymouth after the campaign and moved, with his family, to Liverpool, Nova Scotia where he is said to have built a house. Previous to the year 1755, he had a house at Chignecto, where he occasionally resided in winter. Silvanus Cobb was an original proprietor of the town. In 1759 Capt. Cobb became a proprietor of the new township of Liverpool. Liverpool township was to run from Cape Sable Island to Port Medway and continuing 14 miles inland from the shore. Sylvanus transported many of the other original residents to the new settlement. On July 1, 1760, at the first meeting of the proprietors, Capt. Cobb made a petition to be granted a piece of land to build a house and a wharf. The land was granted and the house was built at the foot of present-day Wolf street. There is a park and monument to Cobb at the site of his original home which was built from materials he transported from New England.

He was afterwards employed in the Expedition against Havana in 1762, where he died of the epidemic which there prevailed, expressing his regret that he had not met a soldier's death at the cannon's mouth. He left an only daughter, who married Col. William Freeman, of Liverpool, N. S. The descendants of Mrs. Freeman are numerous in Queen's County. His younger brother, Jabez Cobb, also settled at Liverpool and left descendants.

== Legacy ==
- Silvanus Cobb Park, Liverpool, Nova Scotia

== See also ==
- Military history of Nova Scotia
