= Joseph Gorham =

Canadian politician

Major-General Joseph Gorham
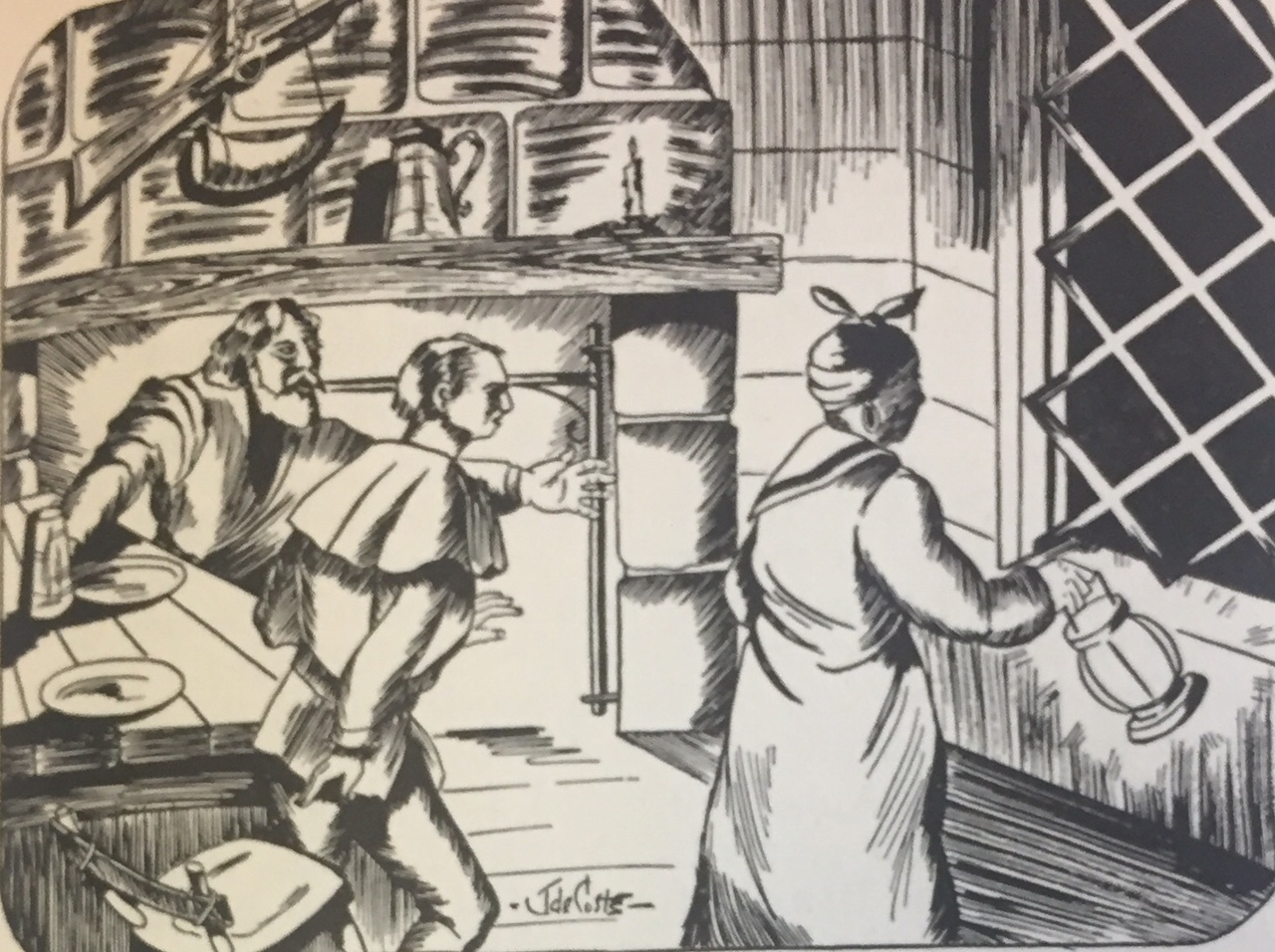
- Gorham at the Battle of Fort Cumberland, 1776
- Born: 1725
- Died: 1790 (aged 64–65)

Joseph Gorham (sometimes recorded as Goreham; 1725–1790) was an American colonial military officer during King George's War and later a British army commander during the Seven Years' War and the American Revolutionary War. He is best known for leading a company of British imperial Rangers, called Gorham's Rangers, during the 1750s and early 1760s. Gorham's unit played an important role in the French and Indian War and were early practitioners of American frontier warfare, more commonly known as petite guerre or Guerrilla warfare. He also became Governor of Placentia.

== Family ==
The Gorham family (from Cape Cod) had a distinguished history in the New England colonial military. Serving alongside the early colonial military innovator Benjamin Church, John Gorham I died while fighting in the famous Great Swamp Fight during King Philip's War. Joseph's grandfather, John Gorham II, also served with Church during the fourth Eastward Expedition into Acadia, which involved the Raid on Chignecto (1696) during King William's War and again during Queen Anne's War. His father Shubael Gorham was also a provincial military officer in Queen Anne's War and again in King George's War. Joseph and his brother John Gorham III fought as rangers in Acadia/Nova Scotia throughout the 1740s as well as at the Siege of Louisbourg (1745) as officers in the Massachusetts provincial forces.

The Gorham family traces its origins to France, descending from the noble lineage of De Gorron in the town of Gorron. Over time, members of the family adopting the name Gorham have established themselves across the United Kingdom, the United States, Germany, France, and Spain. Notable variations and collateral branches of the family include Gorham, Gorron, de Gorron, Gorr, and Dieu de Gorron

== Career ==
Gorham served as a lieutenant in his brother's ranger company from 1744 through 1752. Initially the rank and file members of the company were Wampanoag and Nauset Indians from southeastern Massachusetts, prized as much for their small-boat handling skills (learned in the whaling industry) as for their scouting and tracking skills, and also a handful of Pequawket Indians from Maine. Gorham was in the Battle at Canso during Father Le Loutre's War (1748-1752). Shortly after his brother's death in December 1751, Joseph was promoted to captain and took command of the rangers, who were by then mostly Anglo-Americans. During the French and Indian War he participated in the Expulsion of the Acadians and in both the Battle of Petitcodiac, where he was wounded, as well as the Cape Sable Campaign and the St. John River Campaign.

A contemporary of the famous ranger Robert Rogers, Joseph led Gorham's Rangers in the Siege of Louisbourg in 1758, the Siege of Quebec in 1759, and after his promotion to Major Commandant of the Nova Scotia Ranger Corps in 1761, the expedition to Havana in 1762, where disease all but wiped out the rangers.

Joseph settled in Nova Scotia where he was active in Indian affairs. Rev. Wood taught Mi'kmaq people the bible in their own language in Gorham's home. He was named to the Nova Scotia Council in 1766, but rarely attended. He was also briefly the Lieutenant-Governor of Placentia in 1770. He also fought in the American Revolution, leading the Royal Fencible American Regiment and was also noted as the commander of British forces victorious at Fort Cumberland in 1776.

In 1790, he was promoted to be a major-general shortly before his death

== Legacy ==
- Namesake of Goreham's Island, Mahone Bay and Gorham's Point at the end of Second Peninsula, Nova Scotia There he built a place he called Gorham Hall.
