= Charles Deschamps de Boishébert et de Raffetot =

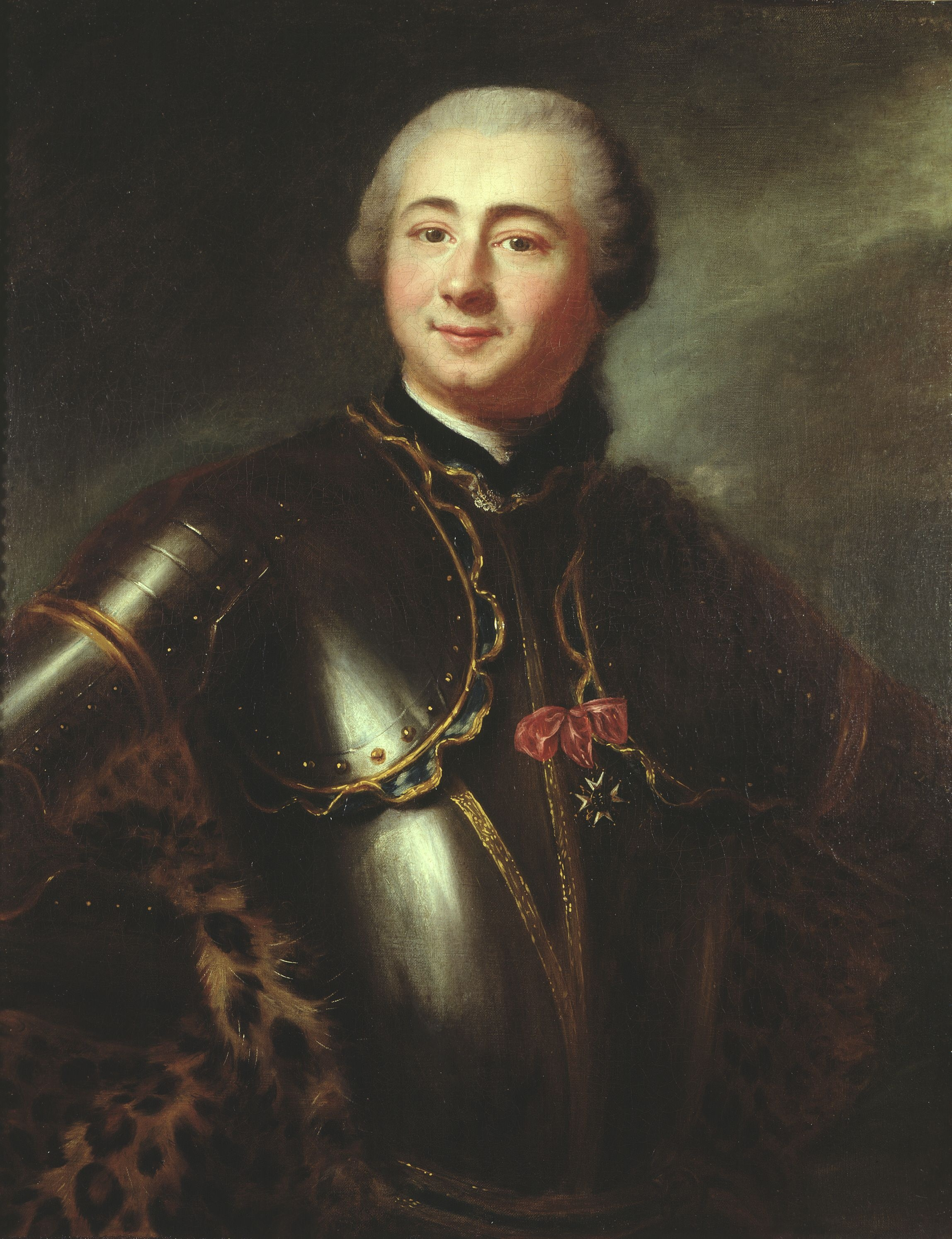
- Charles Deschamps de Boishébert
- Born: 7 February 1727; Quebec
- Died: 9 January 1797 (aged 69); Raffetot, France
- Military career
- Allegiance: Kingdom of France
- Branch: Compagnies Franches de la Marine
- Conflicts: King George's War: Battle at Port-la-Joye; Siege of Annapolis Royal (1746); Battle of Grand Pre; Father Le Loutre's War: Skimmish at St. John; French and Indian War: Raid on Lunenburg (1756); Battle of Petitcodiac; Siege of Louisbourg (1758); Siege of Thomaston, Maine; Raid on Friendship, Maine; Battle of Quebec

Charles Deschamps de Boishébert (also known as Courrier du Bois, Bois Hebert) was a member of the Compagnies Franches de la Marine and was a significant leader of the Acadian militia's resistance to the Expulsion of the Acadians. He settled and tried to protect Acadians refugees along the rivers of New Brunswick. At Beaubears National Park on Beaubears Island, New Brunswick he settled refugee Acadians during the Expulsion of the Acadians.

== King George's War ==
=== Siege of Annapolis Royal ===
From October until 3 November 1746, Boishebert took part in the unsuccessful Siege of Annapolis Royal, Nova Scotia (N.S.), the British administrative and military headquarters in Acadia.

=== Battle at Port-la-Joye ===
After the first Siege of Louisbourg in May–June 1745, a British force composed largely of New England irregulars proceeded to seize Île Saint-Jean (present day Prince Edward Island) and its capital Port-la-Joye, which had a French garrison consisting of about 15 soldiers and 100 Mi'kmaq. The British force consisted of two Royal Navy ships and 200 New England soldiers stationed at Port-La-Joie. Jean-Baptiste Nicolas Roch de Ramezay was sent from Quebec to the region in 1746 to support the Duc d'Anville Expedition in its effort to regain Acadia. Upon arriving at Fort Beauséjour on the Isthmus of Chignecto, he sent Boishébert to Île Saint-Jean on a reconnaissance to assess the size of the British force. After Boishébert returned, Ramezay sent Joseph-Michel Legardeur de Croisille et de Montesson along with over 500 men, 200 of whom were Mi'kmaq, to Port-la-Joye. The battle took place in July 1746 near Port-la-Joye on the bank of the Northeast River (present day Hillsborough River). Montesson and his troops killed forty New Englanders and captured the rest. Montesson was commended for having distinguished himself in his first independent command.

=== Siege of Annapolis Royal (1746) ===
He also participated in the Siege of Annapolis Royal under Ramezay.

=== Battle of Grande Pré ===
Boishébert fought in the Battle of Grand Pré. In the winter of 1747, Ramezay who had marched from Quebec the previous year to support the d'Anville Expedition, ordered his subordinate Nicolas Antoine II Coulon de Villiers with two hundred and fifty Canadians and fifty Mi'Kmaq to fight against Arthur Noble who was stationed at Grand Pré. Boishébert was wounded in the battle fought there on 11 February 1747. Following this French victory he returned to Quebec with the rest of the troops.

== Father Le Loutre's War ==
During Father Le Loutre's War, he contested the arrival of senior British naval officer John Rous when he arrived at the mouth of the Saint John River to claim it for Britain. He built Fort Boishebert and then later, with the building of Fort Beausejour, Boishébert rebuilt Fort Menagoueche at the mouth of the river, and, disguised as a fisherman, went up and down the coasts of Acadia in order to assess the Acadians' loyalty to France.

== French and Indian War ==
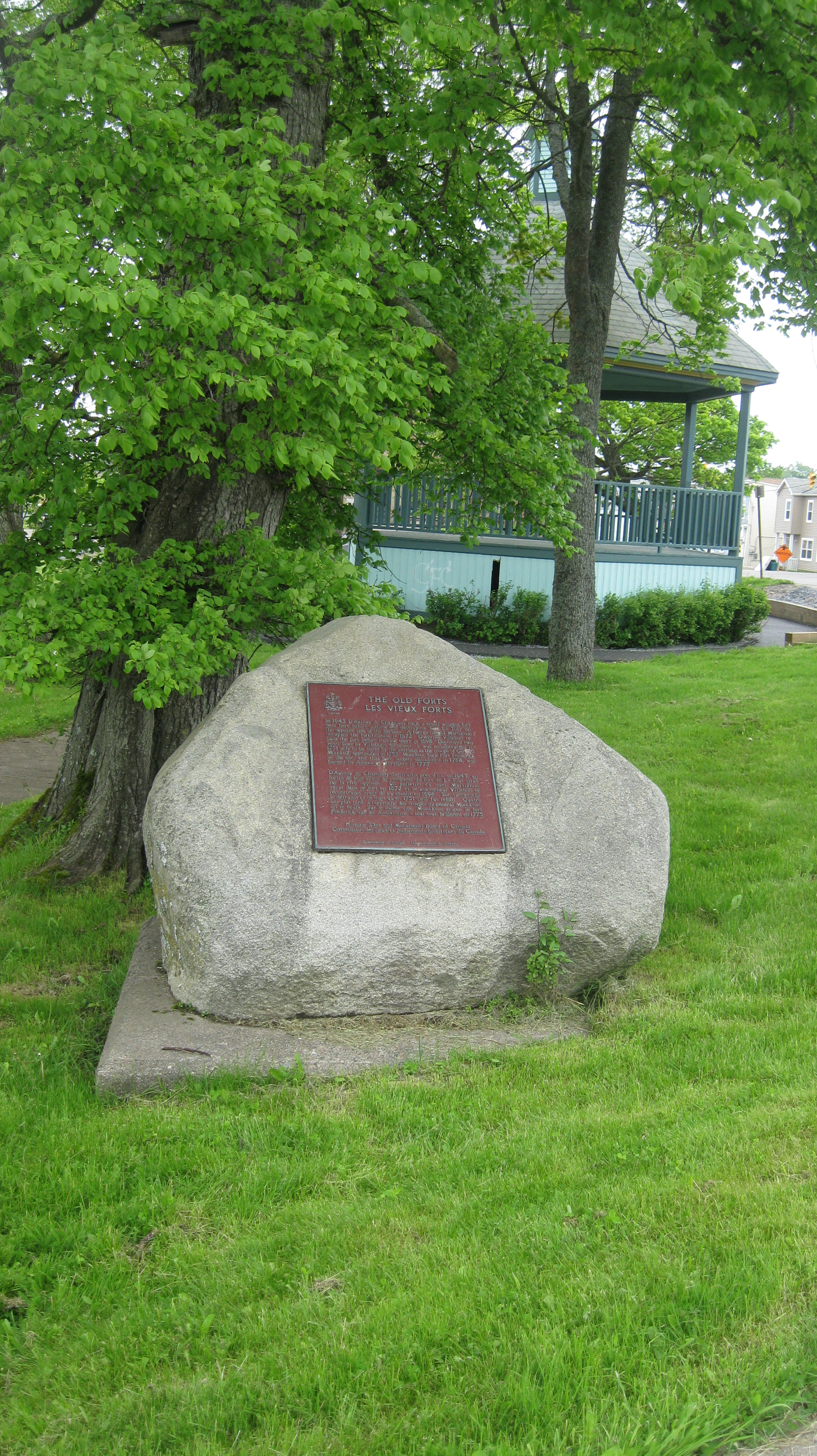
Monument to Fort Menagoueche, Saint John, New Brunswick

During the French and Indian War (the North American theatre of the Seven Years' War), in 1754 Boishebert became the commandant of Fort Menagoueche, at the mouth of the Saint John, and there he resisted British efforts to establish themselves. The victory of the British in the Battle of Fort Beauséjour on 16 June 1755 by Monckton's forces marked a turning-point in Boishébert's career. For the remainder of the war, French Officer Boishébert led the Mi'kmaq and the Acadians in a guerrilla war against the British. Immediately after the fort fell, the British commander dispatched a large detachment against the handful of militiamen at Fort Menagoueche. As there was no hope of a successful outcome, Boishébert burned his fort before the enemy arrived and sought refuge among the local populace, continuing meanwhile to fight the enemy.

=== Battle of Petitcodiac ===
Shortly after the Battle of Fort Beauséjour Boishébert learned that the British intended to attack the villages of Chipoudy (Shepody), Petitcodiac (near Hillsborough), and Memramcook; he immediately left for Chipoudy but arrived too late to prevent the village from being destroyed. On 3 Sept. 1755, however, he confronted a British detachment at Petitcodiac. After three hours of desperate struggle, during which they suffered heavy losses (50 killed and 60 wounded), the British fled. Boishébert, who had lost only one man, returned to the Saint John River with 30 of the most destitute families. However, in all, 200 families were able to escape the deportation, and resettle between Shediac and Cocagne.

He ordered the Raid on Lunenburg (1756).

On January 20, 1756, Boishebert sent Francois Boucher de Niverville to Baie Verte to burn a British schooner. Niverville took the sailors by surprise, killed seven of them, took one prisoner, and burned the ship. At the same time, Boishebert himself led 120 men against Fort Cumberland.

On 12 Oct. 1756 he undertook an expedition against Fort Monckton (formerly Fort Gaspareaux, near Port Elgin, N.B.), but the enemy evacuated the fort and set fire to it before he arrived.

After Louisbourg fell on 26 July 1758, Boishébert withdrew, with the enemy in pursuit. He brought back a large number of Acadians from the region around Port-Toulouse (St. Peter's, Nova Scotia) to the security of his post on the Miramichi.

=== The Acadian Refugee Camps ===
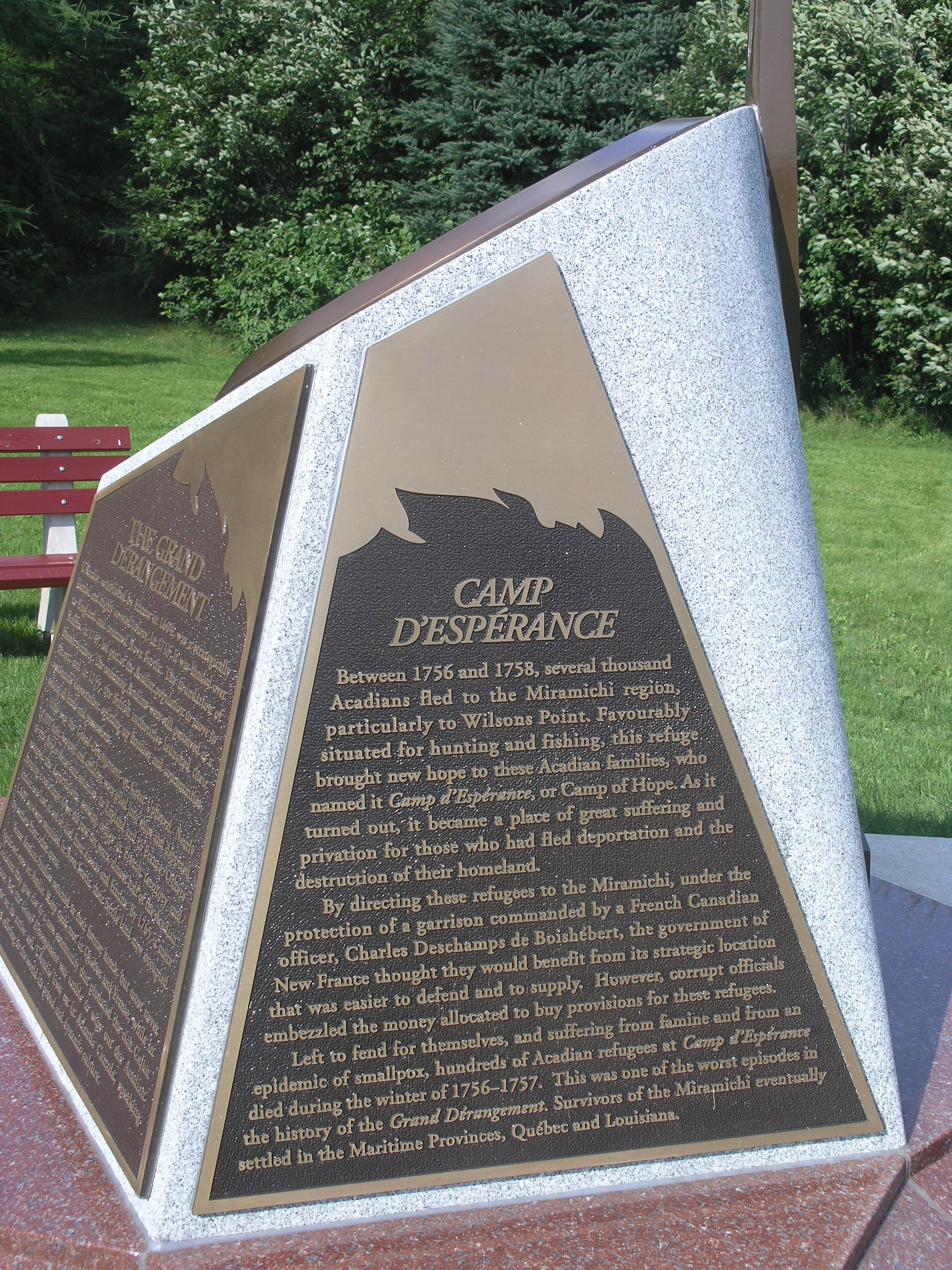
Camp d'Espérance Memorial at Beaubears Island

For the Acadians fleeing the deportation, Boishebert created refugee camps at Shediac, Miramichi, and on the Restitgouche River. He spent part of the winter of 1755–56 at (Shediac, New Brunswick) with the 600 Acadians stationed there. The following year, Boishebert left Shediac and went to Miramichi and established Le Camp d'Esperance (Cape Hope) at Beaubears Island. This camp was reported to have between 1000 and 3500 Acadians. By January 1757, the conditions at Campe d'Esperance were horrendous and riots began to break out over provisions. In January 1757 he went to Beaubears Island on the Miramichi River and there set up his headquarters and a refuge for the Acadians. With Father Charles Germain's help he tried to sustain the Acadians' resistance to the British.

He then established a refugee camp on the Restitgouche River at Petit-Rochelle (present-day Pointe-à-la-Croix, Quebec). After Wolfe had left the area, the 1760 Battle of Restigouche led to the capture of several hundred Acadians at Boishébert's refugee camp at Petit-Rochelle.

Boishébert's was constantly vigilant over these settlements. The settlers had already been deported from the region of Beaubassin, despite Boishébert's attempts to evacuate the most destitute families. His efforts were limited by a scarcity of supplies, which coincided from 1756 to 1758 with a period of extreme poverty for most Acadians.

=== Ile Saint-Jean Campaign ===
He also oversaw the exodus of Acadians from present-day Prince Edward Island in the Ile Saint-Jean Campaign.

=== St. John River Campaign ===
He also assisted Acadians in the St. John River Campaign.

=== Siege of Thomaston, Maine ===
During the French and Indian War, on 13 August 1758 French officer Boishebert left Miramichi, New Brunswick with 400 soldiers for Fort St George (Thomaston, Maine). His detachment reached there on 9 September but was caught in an ambush and had to withdraw. This was Boishébert's last Acadian expedition.

They then went on to raid Friendship, Maine, where people were killed and others taken prisoner.

=== Battle of Quebec ===
With a corps of Acadian volunteers Boishébert took part in the defence of Quebec in the summer of 1759, and also in the decisive battle on the Plains of Abraham. In the winter he returned for the last time to Acadia, to gather reinforcements for the defence of Canada and to restore the morale of the discouraged Acadians.

He was defeated by John Byron, who at the time was a Captain in the Royal Navy, in the Battle of the Restigouche, which put a final nail into the coffin of New France. Thereupon, he returned to France, where he was tried and imprisoned for his part in the corrupt dealings of Francois Bigot, the Superintendent of the colony. He was cleared after 15 months in the Bastille.

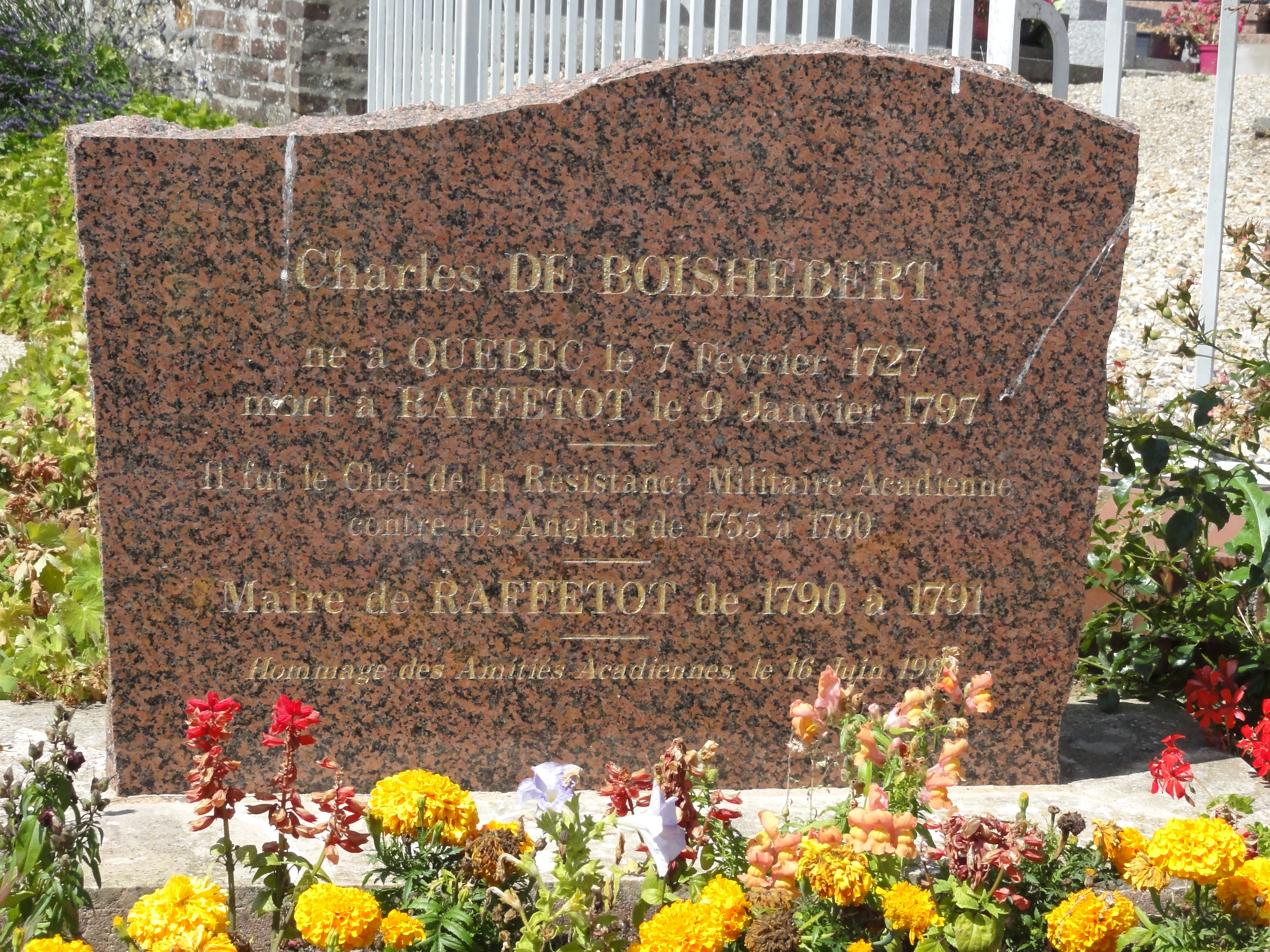
Memorial of Charles de Boishébert at Raffetot.

In 1763 Boishébert was involved in plans for settling Acadians at Cayenne (now French Guiana) and vainly tried to obtain a military appointment there. In 1774 his request for an appointment as inspector of colonial troops was turned down. He sold his Canadian seigneury of La Bouteillerie, also known as Rivière-Ouelle, that year. Until his death, on 9 January 1797, he lived in France at Raffetot, a property he had acquired through his marriage. He was mayor of Raffetot in 1790-1791.
