= Fort Menagoueche =

Former French fort in Canada

Fort Menagouèche
- Saint John, New Brunswick, Canada
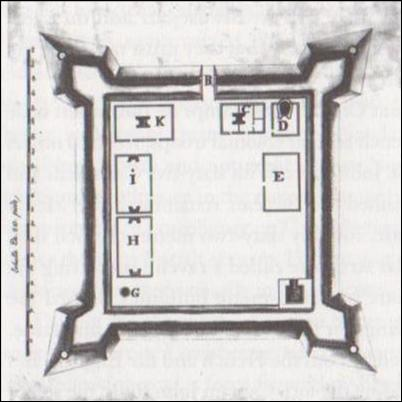

Site information
- Type: Historical French Fort

National Historic Site of Canada
- Official name: Fort Charnisay National Historic Site of Canada
- Designated: 1923
- Owner: Canada: National Historic Sites of Canada
- Controlled by: 1751-1755: France; 1758-?: British Empire ?-present: Canada

Location
- Location within Canada
- Coordinates: 45.2644°N 66.0736°W

Site history
- Built: 1751
- Built by: Charles Deschamps de Boishébert et de Raffetot France; Ignace-Philippe Aubert de Gaspé France
- In use: 1751-1755: France Warehouse/Way Station; 1758-?: British Empire Fort ?-present: Canada Museum

Fort Menagoueche (French: Fort Menagouèche) (1751, destroyed 1755, present historic site) was a French fort at the mouth of the St. John River, New Brunswick, Canada. French Officer Charles Deschamps de Boishébert et de Raffetot and Ignace-Philippe Aubert de Gaspé built the fort during Father Le Loutre's War and eventually burned it themselves as the French retreated after losing the Battle of Beausejour. It was reconstructed as Fort Frederick by the British.

Due to the succession of strategic French and British forts at this location, the site was designated a National Historic Site of Canada in 1923.

== History ==
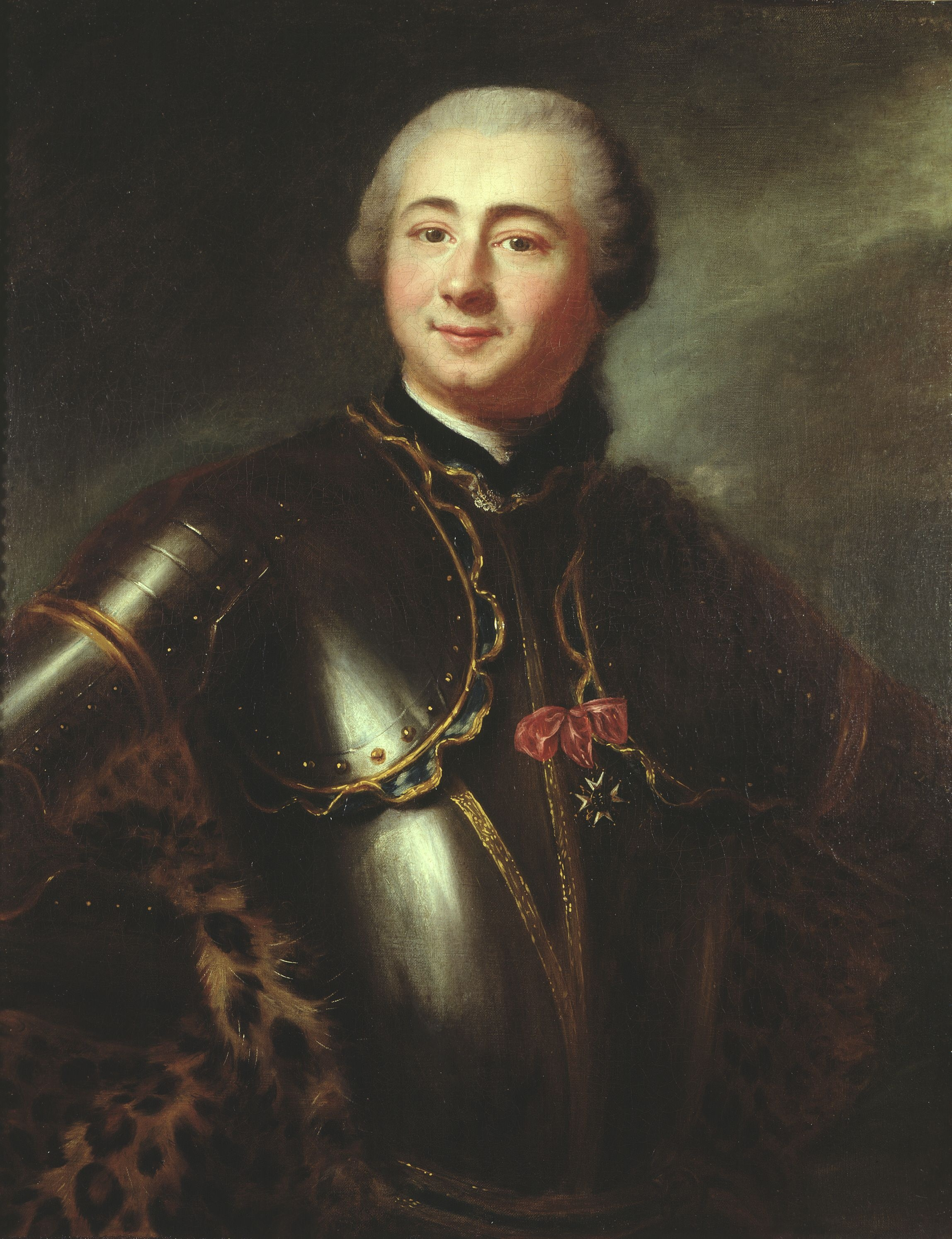
Marquis de Boishébert - Charles Deschamps de Boishébert et de Raffetot (1753)

Despite the British Conquest of Acadia in 1710, Nova Scotia remained primarily occupied by Catholic Acadians and Mi'kmaq. Father Le Loutre's War began when Edward Cornwallis arrived to establish Halifax with 13 transports on June 21, 1749. Some Mi'kmaq believed the British were violating earlier treaties (1726), which were signed after Father Rale's War. The British quickly began to build other settlements. To guard against Mi'kmaq, Acadian and French attacks on the new Protestant settlements, British fortifications were erected in Halifax (1749), Dartmouth (1750), Bedford (Fort Sackville) (1751), Lunenburg (1753) and Lawrencetown (1754).

Within 18 months of establishing Halifax, the British also took firm control of peninsula Nova Scotia by building fortifications in all the major Acadian communities: present-day Windsor (Fort Edward); Grand-Pré (Fort Vieux Logis) and Chignecto (Fort Lawrence). A British fort already existed at the other major Acadian centre of Annapolis Royal, Nova Scotia. Cobequid remained without a fort.

The only land route between Louisbourg and Quebec went from Baie Verte through Chignecto, along the Bay of Fundy and up the St. John River. With the establishment of Halifax, the French Canadians recognized at once the threat it represented and that the St. John River corridor might be used to attack Quebec City itself. To protect this vital gateway, at the beginning of 1749, the French strategically constructed three forts within 18 months along the route: one at Baie Verte (Fort Gaspareaux), one at Chignecto (Fort Beausejour) and another at the mouth of the St. John River (Fort Menagoueche).

=== Establishment ===
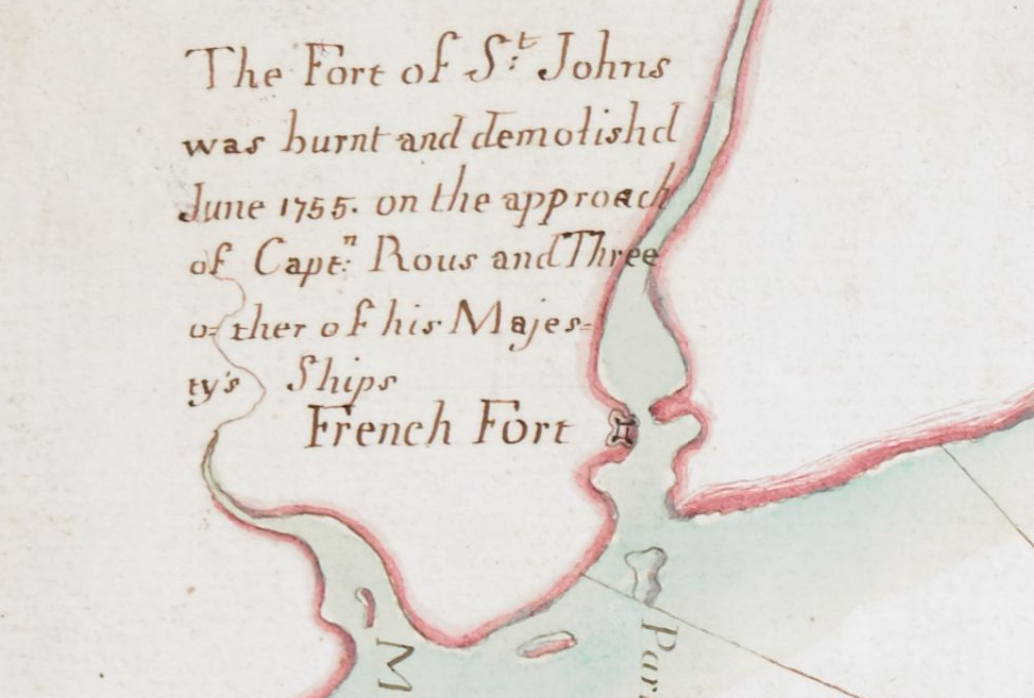
Fort Menagoueche by Charles Morris (inset of A chart of the sea coasts of the peninsula of Nova Scotia, 1755)

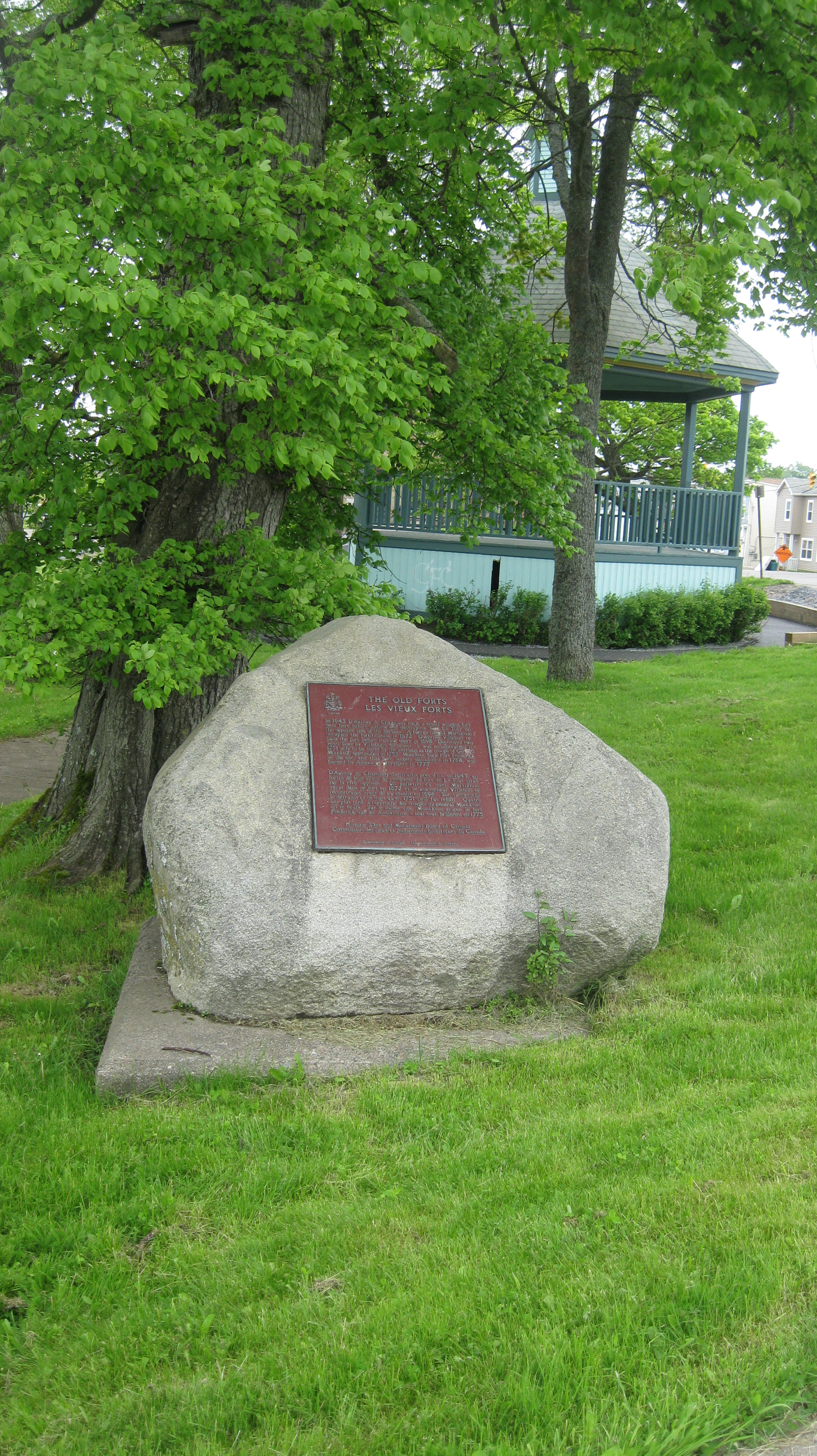
Monument to Fort Menagoueche, Saint John, New Brunswick

Acadians had lived in the St. John valley almost continuously since the early seventeenth century. After the Conquest of Acadia (1710), Acadians migrated from peninsula Nova Scotia to the French-occupied Saint John River. These Acadians were seen as the most resistant to British rule in the region.

The St. John River residents had always proven effective at resisting the British. The Maliseet militia, from their base at Meductic, conducted effective warfare along with the Mi'kmaq militia against New England throughout the colonial wars. As late as 1748, there were only twelve French-speaking families living on the river. The French built a fort at the mouth of the St. John River in April 1748. In the fall of 1748, after King George's War, the Acadians and Mi'kmaq prevented John Gorham from landing to acquire an oath of allegiance. His rangers were fired upon and he took two Mi'kmaq prisoner. In 1749, at the beginning of Father Le Loutre's War, Boishebert rebuked British naval officer John Rous at St. John. Boishébert built Fort Boishebert after withdrawing from the mouth of the Saint John River under the terms of an agreement arranged by Captain John Rous and Edward How.

Boishebert abandoned Fort Boishebert and moved further down the river to build Fort Menagouche. With 65 Canadians and 120 natives, he rebuilt the ruined Fort St. Jean. Fort Menagoueche was effectively a fortified warehouse manned by a small garrison. It was built in 1751 by the order of the Marquis de la Jonquière as a way station between Fort Beauséjour and Louisbourg and Québec.

The fort was subsequently abandoned in 1751 by Sr. de Gaspe when the French reestablished their control and fortified the mouth of the Saint John River with Fort Menagoueche. In 1749, Boishebert assigned Acadian Joseph Godin dit Bellefontaine to lead the Acadian militia in the St. John Region.

In April 1755, while searching for a wrecked vessel at Port La Tour, Cobb discovered the French schooner Marguerite (Margarett), taking war supplies to the Saint John River for Boishébert at Fort Menagoueche. Cobb returned to Halifax with the news and was ordered by Governor Charles Lawrence to blockade the harbour until Captain William Kensey arrived in the warship HMS Vulture, and then to assist Kensey in capturing the French prize and taking it to Halifax.

Communication with Fort Beauséjour across the Isthmus of Chignecto was at first via an ancient portage route, but, in 1754, a road was built linking the two forts. Communication by sea was possible in the summer to Québec, Louisbourg and France.

Immediately after the Battle of Fort Beauséjour (1755), Robert Monckton sent a detachment under the command of John Rous to take Fort Menagoueche. Boishebert knew that he faced a superior force so he burned the fort and retreated up the river to undertake guerrilla warfare. The destruction of Fort Menagoueche left Louisbourg as the last French fort in Acadia. Boishebert made his first strike in the Battle of Petitcodiac.

With the decommissioning of Fort Frederick (Maine), the British then reconstructed the fortress at St. John and named it Fort Frederick during the St. John River Campaign (1758).

== See also ==
- Charles Deschamps de Boishébert et de Raffetot
- St. John River Campaign
- Fort Boishebert
- Fort Beauséjour
- List of French forts in North America
