= Battle at Port-la-Joye =

1746 battle of King George's War

Coordinates: 46°11′3.7″N 62°32′0.7″W

- Part of King George's War
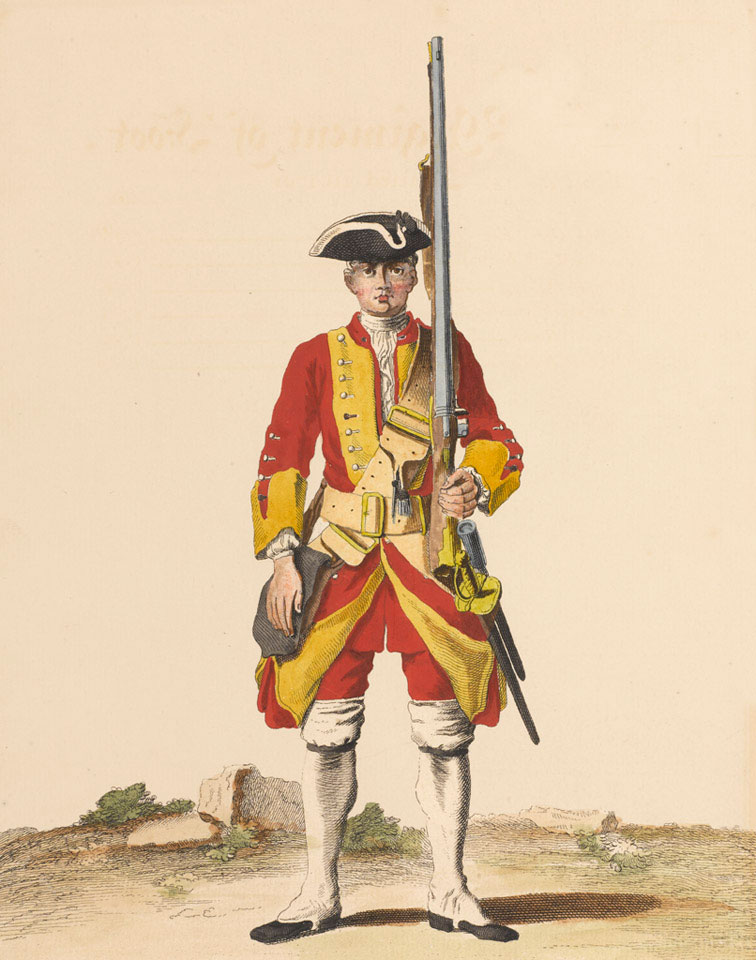
- c. 1742 illustration of a private of the 29th Foot
Date	11 July 1746
Location	Port la Joye, near Northeast River, Ile Saint Jean (present day Hillsborough River, Prince Edward Island)
Result	French-Mi'kmaq victory

Belligerents
France; New France; Mi'kmaq militia	British America; Great Britain

Commanders and leaders
Jean-Baptiste Nicolas Roch de Ramezay (overall French commander); Nicolas Antoine II Coulon de Villiers (French commander); Charles Deschamps de Boishébert et de Raffetot; Joseph-Michel Legardeur de Croisille et de Montesson	Captain John Rous, Captain Hugh Scott

Units involved
Acadian militia Wabanaki Confederacy (Mi'kmaq militia); Troupes de la marine	29th Regiment; Gorham's Rangers

Strength
300 French regulars and militia; 200 Mi'kmaq	200 regulars Unknown number of sailors

Casualties and losses
2 killed 2 wounded	34 killed 7 captured

The Battle at Port-la-Joye (also known as the Port-la-Joye Massacre) was a battle in King George's War that took place between the British Army and a combined force of French troops and Mi'kmaq militia on the banks of present-day Hillsborough River, Prince Edward Island in the summer of 1746. French officer Jean-Baptiste Nicolas Roch de Ramezay sent French and Mi'kmaq forces to Port-la-Joye where they surprised and defeated a force of 200 soldiers of the 29th Regiment of Foot that were gathering provisions for recently captured fortress of Louisbourg.

== Background ==
After he first fall of Louisbourg, New England commander William Pepperrell sent an expedition against Ile Saint Jean in July 1755. The expeditionary force split up, with one force going to Three Rivers (present-day Georgetown/Brudenell), and the other to Port-La-Joye. At Three Rivers, the Acadians present did not give any resistance because they only had one 6-pound cannon to mount a defence. The Acadians fled into the woods while the New England troops burned the empty village. Many of the fleeing Acadians escaped to Saint Peters (PEI) and then went on to Quebec, remaining there until the end of the war.

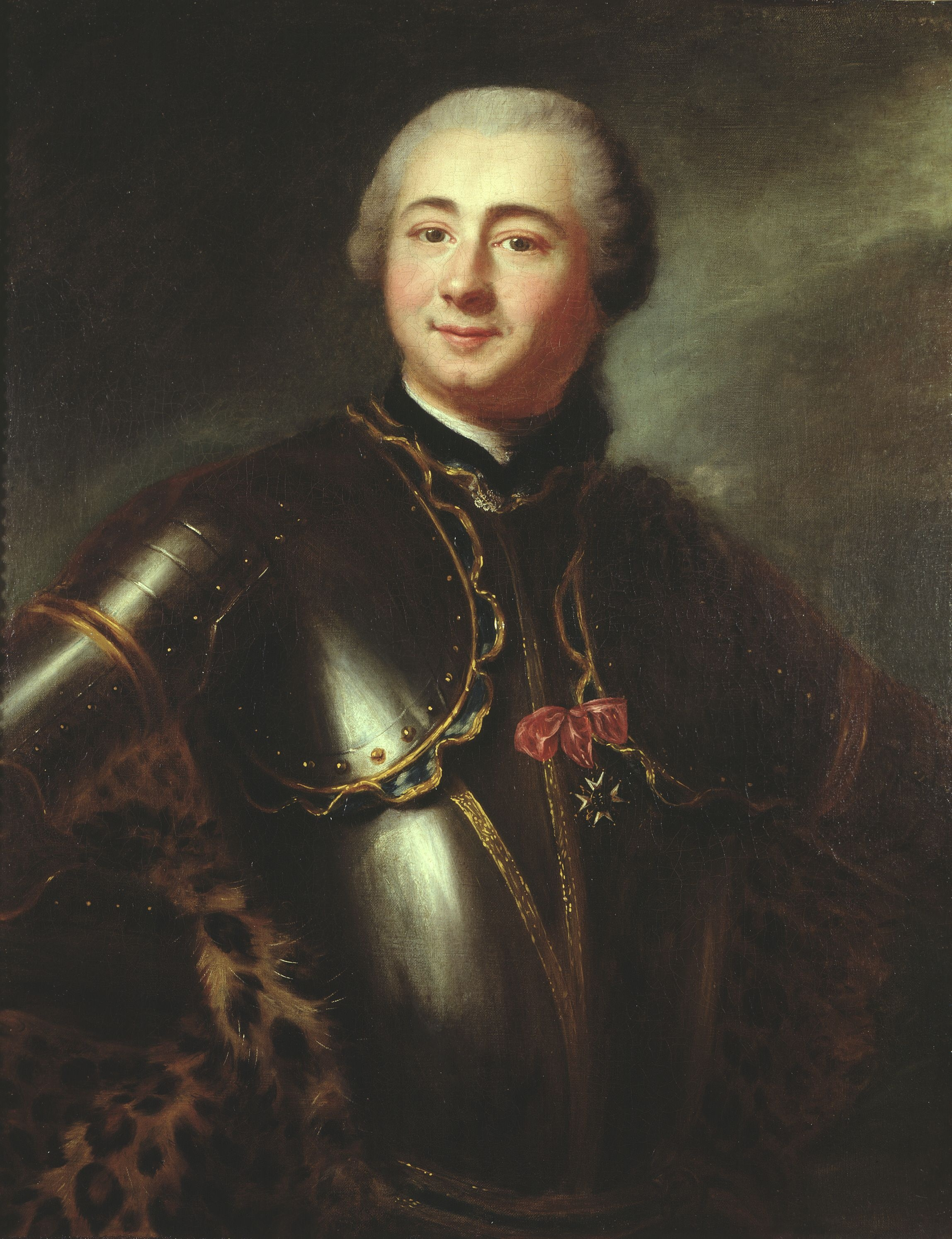
Charles Deschamps de Boishébert et de Raffetot

At the same time, in July 1745, the other New England force landed at Port-la-Joye. Under the command of Joseph de Pont Duvivier, the French had a garrison of 20 regulars (of the Compagnies Franches de la Marine) at Port-la-Joye. The French regulars fled and New Englanders burned the capital to the ground. Duvivier and his 20 men retreated up the Northeast River (Hillsborough River), pursued by the New Englanders until they received reinforcements from the Acadian militia and the Mi'kmaq. The French troops and their allies were able to drive the New Englanders to their boats, killing, wounding, or capturing nine soldiers. The New Englanders took six Acadians as hostages, claiming they would be executed if the Acadians or Mi'kmaq rebelled against British control again. The New England troops left for Louisbourg. Duvivier and his 20 troops left for Quebec. After the fall of Louisbourg, the resident French population of Ile Royal were deported to France. The Acadians of Ile Saint-Jean lived under the threat of deportation for the remainder of the war.

The following year, in an effort to recapture Acadia, a French expedition under the command of de Ramezay was sent from Quebec to work with the Duc d'Anville expedition. De Ramezay's force arrived in Nova Scotia in July 1746. He had 700 soldiers and 21 officers. He made camp at Chignecto, where he was met by 300 Abenaki from St. John River and about 300 Mi'kmaq from Nova Scotia. The total French-Indian force numbered close to 1,300 men. De Ramezay's soldiers spent the summer and the fall waiting for the arrival of the long overdue D'Anville expedition. During this time period, Ramzay sent troops to British-occupied Port-La-Joye on present-day Prince Edward Island.

== Battle ==
Captain John Rous commanded the 24-gun snow Shirley Galley and a schooner as a tender. On board the snow was 40 soldiers of Francis Fuller's 29th Regiment of Foot, including Captain Hugh Scott. The newly appointed British governor of the Isle Royal, Commodore Sir Charles Knowles, 1st Baronet, sent Rous to get supplies from the Acadians to feed the British troops at Louisbourg.

Ramezay initially sent Charles Deschamps de Boishébert et de Raffetot to Ile Saint-Jean on a reconnaissance to assess the size of the British force. Boishébert saw two British ships, the galley Shirley and 700-ton troopship Ruby along with 200 troops at Port-la-Joye boarding supplies for Louisburg. On board the vessels were at least two of the Acadian hostages taken by the New Englanders the year before. After Boishébert returned, Ramezay sent Joseph-Michel Legardeur de Croisille et de Montesson along with over 500 men, 200 of whom were Mi'kmaq, to Port-La-Joye.

While the 29th Regiment waited for the Acadians to send half of their cattle to the British troops at Louisbourg, the regiment was unarmed in the field on the banks of the Northeast River (Hillsborough River), close to Port-la-Joye, making hay. Their arms remained in a tent. On July 11, de Montesson caught the 29th by surprise. The Acadian and Mi'kmaq force killed 27 soldiers and 7 sailors, while suffering two Mi'kmaq killed and another two injured. While the attack was happening, Rous and Scott were on Shirley Galley, which opened fire on the attackers with little effect. The attacking party eventually retreated and Scott took 40 Acadians prisoners and later ransomed them to the commander of the Duc d'Anville expedition.

On July 23, 1746, de Montesson returned to de Ramezay at Chignecto with two of the Acadian prisoners the New Englanders had taken previously, numerous British prisoners of war and an Acadian pilot.

== Aftermath ==
Months later Ramzey was unsuccessful in his attack on Annapolis Royal because of the failure of the Duc d'Anville expedition to arrive at the capital. The following year Ramezay won a victory at the Battle of Grand Pré.

Montesson took the British prisoners first to Baie-Verte and then Ramezay sent them under heavy guard to the prison camp at Québec, along with a commendation for Montesson for having distinguished himself in his first independent command.

The battle led to an order that all officers in the 29th Regiment must always be armed, thus earning their first nickname as the Ever Sworded due to the swords the officers are required to wear even when off-duty a tradition still in effect today as the orderly officer is still armed even at the officers mess.

== See also ==
- Military history of Nova Scotia
- List of massacres in Canada
