= Beaubears Island =

Island in New Brunswick, Canada

Coordinates: 46°58′18″N 65°34′27″W

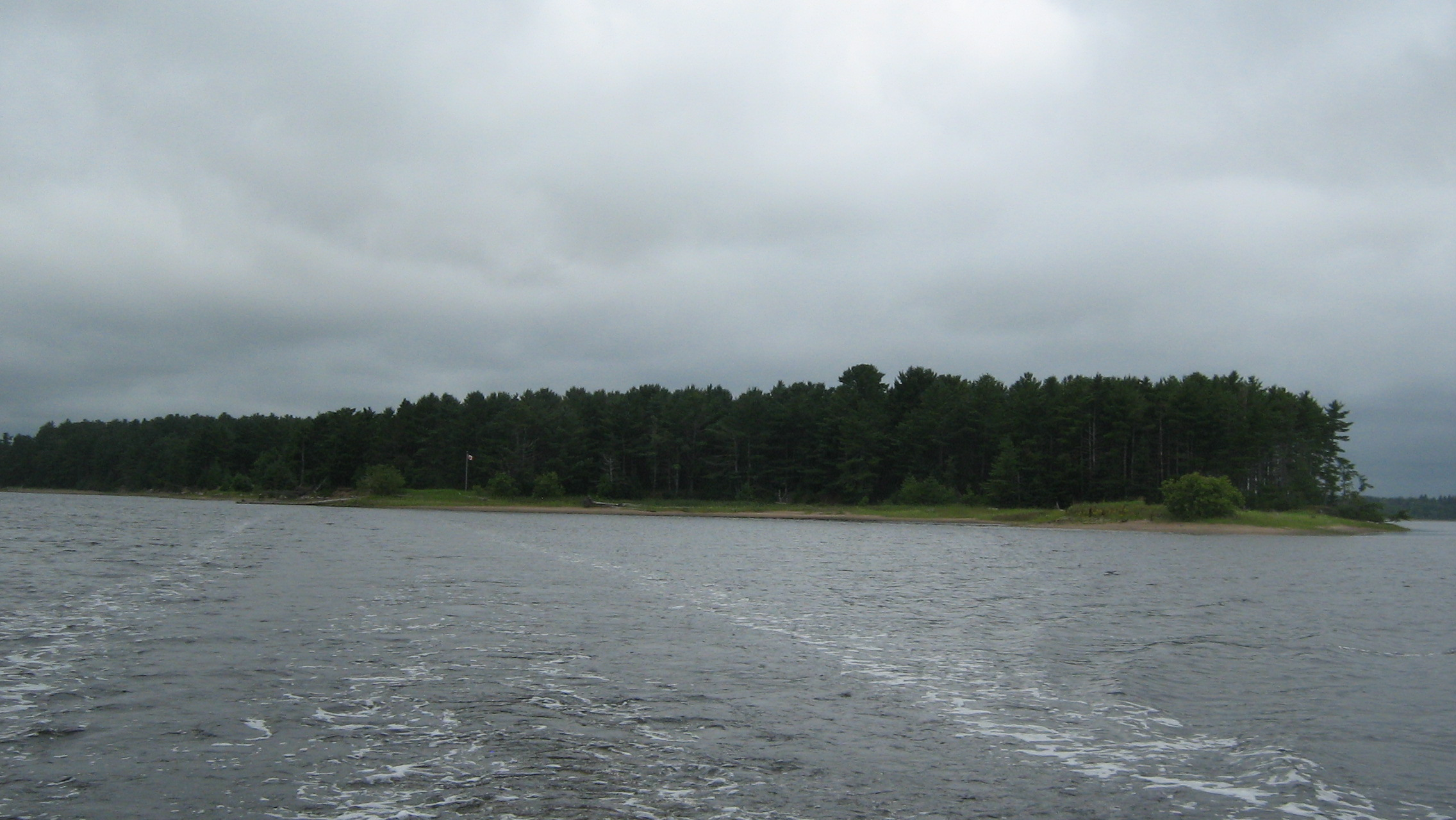
- Interactive map of Beaubears Island

Geography
- Location: Miramichi, New Brunswick

Administration
- Canada

Additional information
- Official website: www.beaubearsisland.ca/

National Historic Site of Canada
- Official name: Beaubears Island Shipbuilding National Historic Site of Canada
- Designated: 2001

National Historic Site of Canada
- Official name: Boishébert National Historic Site of Canada
- Designated: 1930

Beaubears Island (French: Île Boishébert) is an island at the confluence of the Northwest Miramichi and Southwest Miramichi Rivers near Miramichi, New Brunswick, Canada. The island is known for being the site of an Acadian refugee camp during the French and Indian War. The camp was under the command of leader of the Acadian resistance to the expulsion, Charles Deschamps de Boishébert et de Raffetot.

The island is home to two National Historic Sites, Beaubears Island Shipbuilding National Historic Site and Boishébert National Historic Site.

The shipbuilding site occupies the eastern end of the island, while the Boishébert site comprises the rest of the island and adjacent Wilson's Point. The Wilson's Point portion is a New Brunswick provincial historic site, owned by the province and, while not national park land, Wilson's Point is part of the designated National Historic Site. With the exception of Wilson's Point, both sites are administered by Parks Canada in collaboration with the Friends of Beaubears Island. The sites retain 200-year-old Eastern White Pines; thus the parks are significant from the perspectives of both human and natural history.

== History ==
Prior to Acadian settlement in the region, the Mi'kmaq people camped on the island.

=== Boishébert and the Acadians ===
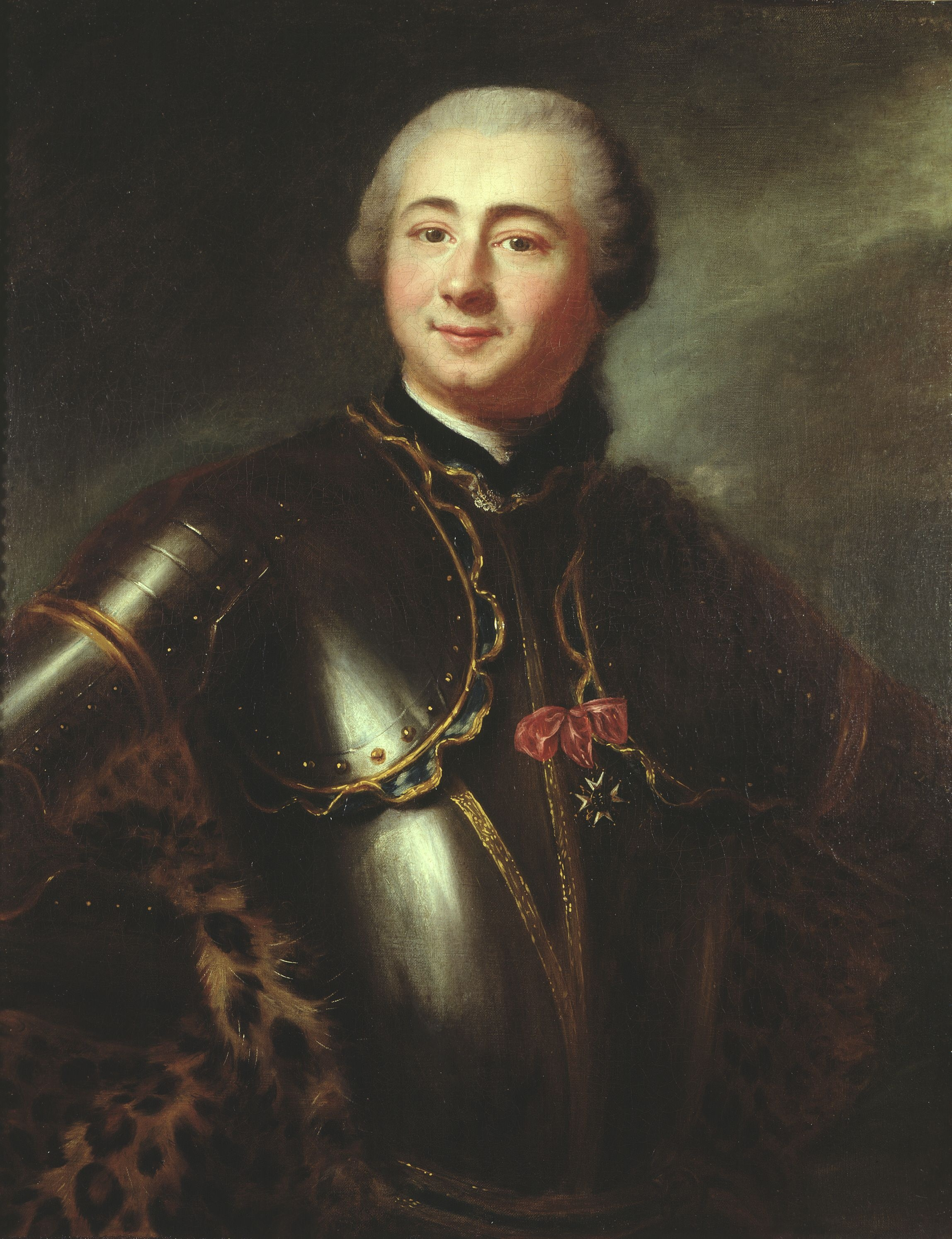
Marquis de Boishébert - Charles Deschamps de Boishébert et de Raffetot (1753)

During the French and Indian War, Charles Deschamps de Boishébert et de Raffetot led the Acadian and Mi`kmaq resistance to the Expulsion of the Acadians. Toward this end, to help Acadians evade capture, Boishébert set up an Acadian refugee camp on the Island. The Camp was named Camp de l' Esperance. The camp lasted between 1756 - 1759.

After Louisbourg fell on 26 July 1758, French officer Boishébert withdrew, with the British in pursuit. Boishebert brought back a large number of Acadians from the region around Port-Toulouse (St. Peter's, Nova Scotia) to the security of his post at Beaubears Island on the Miramichi River.

During the Ile Saint-Jean Campaign and the St. John River Campaign the number of Acadian refugees increased dramatically. The camp had eventually 900 French refugees. Over 200 of the refugees died at the camp. During the war, the camp was protected by a battery of 16 French cannons at French Fort Cove.

During the Gulf of St. Lawrence Campaign, on September 15, 1758, Brigadier James Murray was at Miramichi and discovered that there were many Acadian refugees at a settlement about ten leagues up the Miramichi River which had fled during the Ile Saint-Jean Campaign. According to Murray, all of the Acadians were starving. They had sent most of their effects on to Canada and expected so to go there themselves.

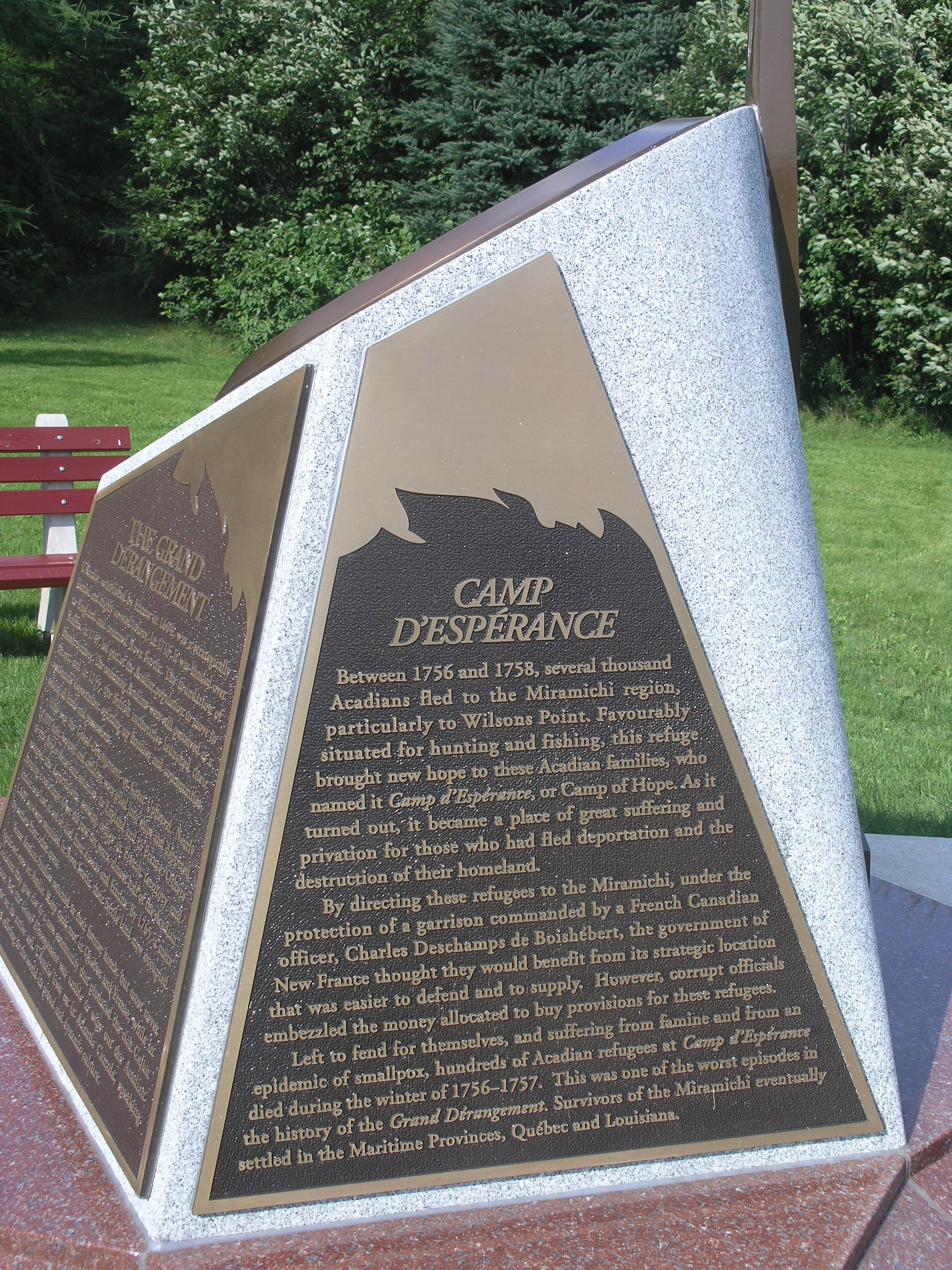
Camp d'Espérance Memorial at Wilson's Point (IR Walker 2007)

Beaubears (Boishébert) Island and nearby Wilson's Point (a.k.a. Beaubears Point or the Enclosure) together form Boishébert National Historic Site of Canada.

=== J. Leonard O'Brien and Shipbuilding ===
The first shipyard was established by James Fraser and James Thom (1790). For the first half of the nineteenth century, the Fraser shipyard was considered the most important commercial establishment in New Brunswick. The 1850s were regarded as the golden age of Miramichi shipbuilding with yards in operation from Beaubears Island. Harley continued to build ships and in 1866 launched what is believed to be the last vessel constructed at Beaubears, the barque La Plata.

By the end of the 19th century, the island appears to have been deserted. It was acquired by the O'Brien family in 1920 and willed to the government of Canada in 1973 following the death of Joseph Leonard O'Brien, a former lieutenant governor of New Brunswick.

Beaubears Island Shipbuilding National Historic Site of Canada, also known as J. Leonard O'Brien Memorial, is the only known, undisturbed archaeological site associated with the national significance of the 19th century wooden shipbuilding industry in New Brunswick. In accordance with O'Brien's wishes, the island was willed to Parks Canada and remains an integral part of Canadian history as a whole.

== Affiliations ==
The Museum is affiliated with: CMA, CHIN, and Virtual Museum of Canada.

== See also ==
- List of communities in New Brunswick
- List of islands of New Brunswick
