= Battle of Fort Beauséjour =

1755 battle of the French and Indian War

- Part of the French and Indian War
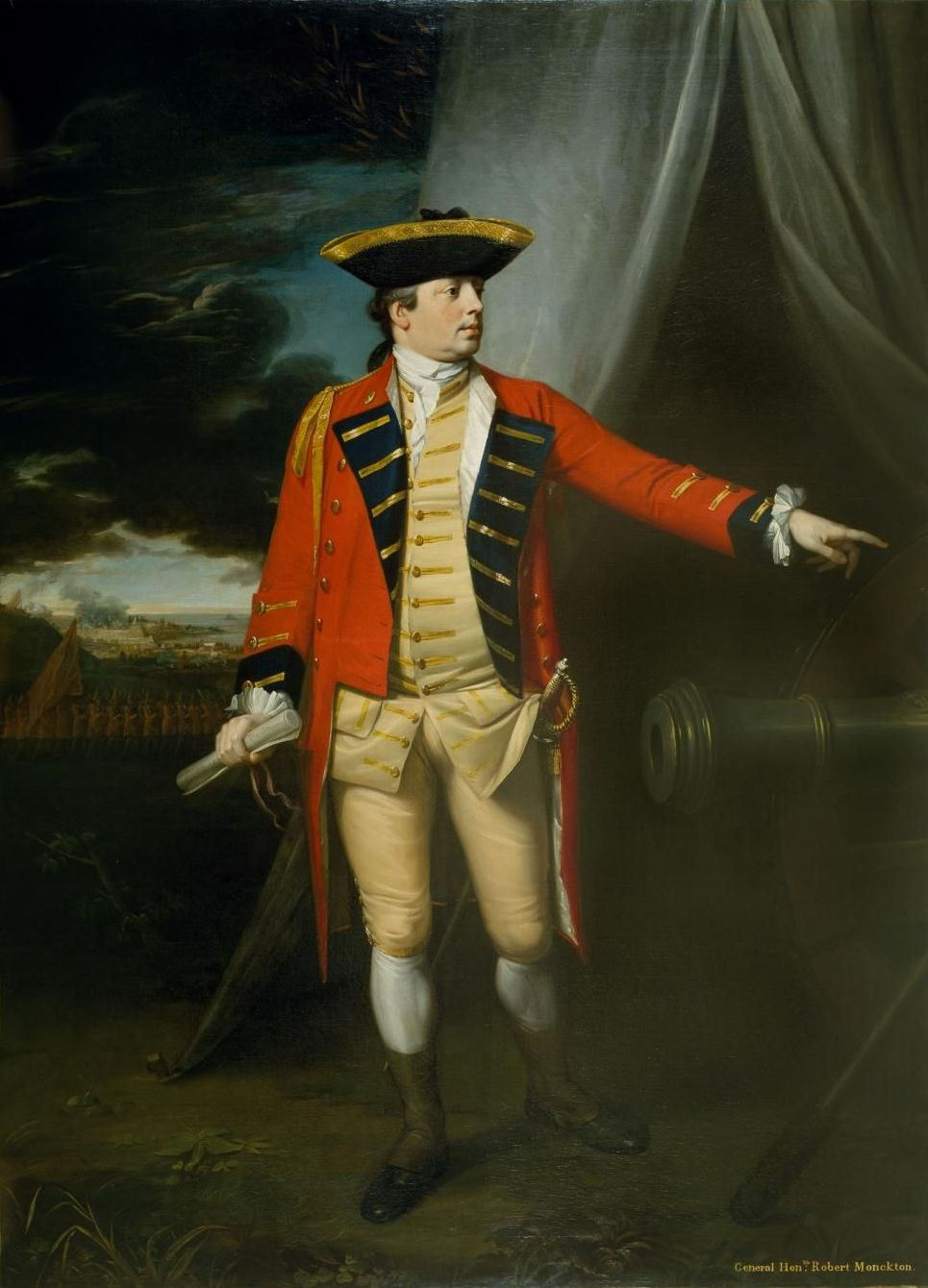
- Portrait of Robert Monckton by Benjamin West
Date	June 3–16, 1755
Location	Near present-day Sackville, New Brunswick, Canada 45°51′56″N 64°17′27″W
Result	British victory

Belligerents
France; Mi'kmaq militia Acadian militia	Great Britain

Commanders and leaders
Louis Du Pont Duchambon de Vergor	Robert Monckton; George Scott; Naval Captain John Rous; John Winslow; Jedidiah Preble; Benjamin Goldthwait; Winckworth Tonge

Strength
162 troupes de la Marine; 300 Acadian militia	270 British army troops 2,000 New England militia

Casualties and losses
8 killed, 6 wounded	4 killed, 16 wounded

The Battle of Fort Beauséjour was fought on the Isthmus of Chignecto and marked the end of Father Le Loutre's War and the opening of a British offensive in the Acadia/Nova Scotia theatre of the Seven Years' War, which would eventually lead to the end of the French colonial empire in North America.

Beginning June 3, 1755, a British army under Lieutenant-Colonel Robert Monckton staged out of nearby Fort Lawrence, besieged the small French garrison at Fort Beauséjour with the goal of opening the Isthmus of Chignecto to British control. Control of the isthmus was pivotal to the French because it was the only gateway between Quebec and Louisbourg during the winter months. After two weeks of siege, Louis Du Pont Duchambon de Vergor, the fort's commander, capitulated on June 16.

== Historical context ==
Tensions between the English and the French concerning the Acadian territory date to the seventeenth century, when France established its Acadian colony, which made them neighbors with the Puritans in New England. One of the main reasons for tensions was the question of jurisdiction, especially after the conquest of Acadia (1710). The isthmus of Chignecto was claimed by both the French and English whereas present day Nova Scotia was claimed by the English. The border differentiating the two was the Missaguash River; however, Acadians settled on both sides of the river. English claim to present day New Brunswick, and Northern Maine conflicted with small French presence and Acadian settlement in the area. Despite this, France's Louis XV encouraged Acadians to migrate to the land west of the Missaguash, and toward Fort Beauséjour.

In the 1750s, New Englanders were subjects to drought, despondency, high taxes and violence, all of which were further manipulated by Puritan and Protestant priests to garner support for an impending attack on the Catholic French. Furthermore, the close relationship between the French and the Mikmaq in the area exasperated the English. Acadians often married the Mikmaq people, leading to an ethnic accord and the creation of a unique local population. The English especially resented the Acadians for holding rich land and for the support they had from the Mikmaq, which prevented the establishment of a Protestant settlement. A major problem for the New Englanders was the close relationship between the Acadians, the French, and the Mikmaq.

Abbé Le Loutre, the priest at Fort Beauséjour, created yet another source of tension as he was a representative of the French government, and therefore also allied to the Mikmaq. Le Loutre was loyal to France and to ensure the Acadians' allegiance, he threatened physical and spiritual harm to the Acadians if they were ever venture into English territory. In the face of religious and military excommunication, Acadians subdued any English support they may have had. Le Loutre also encouraged the Mikmaq to continue to align themselves against the British which they had done since King William's War (1689). The British put a bounty on Le Loutre.

Lieutenant-Colonel Lawrence and the Nova Scotia Council, along with many previous governors, had noted that on many occasions, the Acadians did not act neutrally. Lawrence had evidence that at least some Acadians clearly favoured the French and hoped to force all of the Acadians to take an oath of allegiance to the English. The English in New England considered the Acadians traitors to Britain and as "French bigots", whom they hoped would be moved to Philadelphia. Lawrence had little regard for the unique lifestyle of the Acadians and their declaration of neutrality. Consequently, some historians have suggested the Lawrence was motivated by wanting to clear rich land for New Englanders. Others have noted that the deportation was primarily based on military purposes to remove any military threat Acadians posed in their alliance with the Mi'kmaq people and the Acadian support of Louisbourg.

In 1753, French troops from Canada marched south and seized and fortified the Ohio Valley. Britain protested the invasion and claimed Ohio for itself. On May 28, 1754, the French and Indian War spawned with the Battle of Jumonville Glen. French officer Ensign de Jumonville and a third of his escort were attacked and killed by a British patrol led by George Washington. In retaliation the French and the Indians defeated the British at Fort Necessity. Washington lost a third of his force, and surrendered.

In Acadia, the primary British objective was to defeat the French fortifications at Beausejour and Louisbourg. The British saw the Acadians' allegiance to the French and the Wabanaki Confederacy as a military threat. Father Le Loutre's War had created the conditions for total war; British civilians had not been spared and, as Governor Charles Lawrence and the Nova Scotia Council saw it, Acadian civilians had provided intelligence, sanctuary, and logistical support while others had fought against the British.

Throughout all of this, the British were nervous about a French and native invasion. As a result of native raids supported by the French some British settlers left their settlements (see Raid on Dartmouth (1751)). As a result of the military buildup at Chignecto, as part of the larger coordinated effort of the French and Indian War, the Governor of Massachusetts, William Shirley planned to take Fort Beausejour. Shirley's intelligence fermented the idea that the only way of saving Massachusetts was to attack Beauséjour.

== Fort Beauséjour: construction and espionage ==
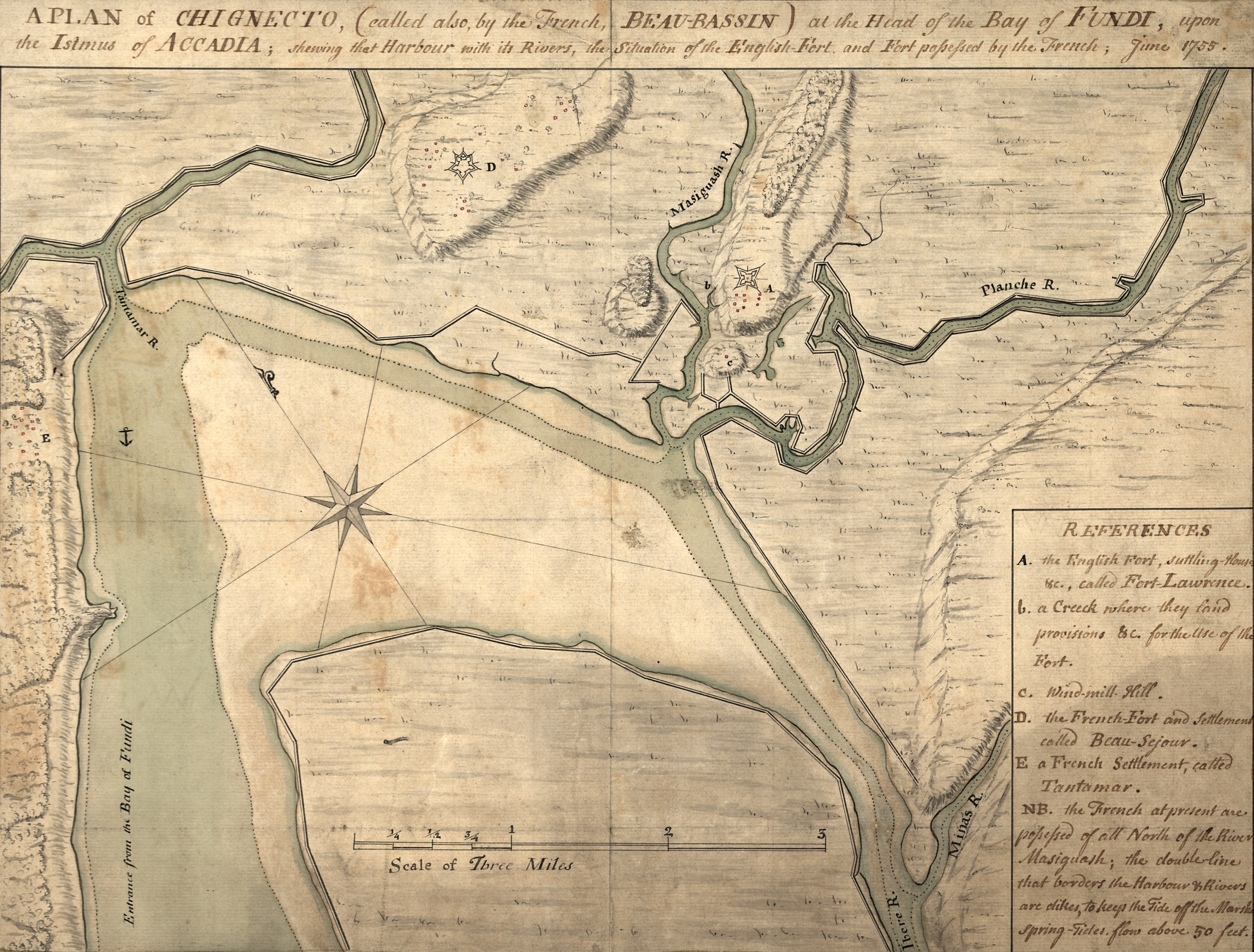
Map of Chignecto (1755)

In 1750, the Governor of New France Jacques-Pierre de la Jonquière heard that the English were building a fort in the region of Acadia. This fort later became Fort Lawrence. In response, the French decided to build Fort Beauséjour. The building of the fort began in 1751 and the plans created by a military engineer named Jacau de Fiedmont, who became a lieutenant in 1752. Fiedmont was responsible for the construction of the fort as well as for the plans of its defence. The fort was supposed to be strong enough to withstand bombardment, but Fort Beauséjour was not completely finished in 1755, for multiple reasons. To begin with, the fort's priest Abbé Le Loutre decided to reallocate manpower to an irrigation project. Also, Louis du Chambon de Vergor, the military commander at Fort Beauséjour in 1754, was more concerned with keeping the money for himself and was therefore not putting the resources to use strengthening the defences of Fort Beauséjour. Jacau de Fiedmont's journal, The Siege of Beauséjour in 1755: A Journal of the Attack on Beauséjour, puts emphasis on the point that if the fortifications would have been completed by the beginning of the siege, the Fort would have had higher resistance against bombardment which would have increased the morale of the French and Acadian defenders. Fiedmont continually insisted on working on the defences because of the fort's weaknesses, yet this work was never completed.

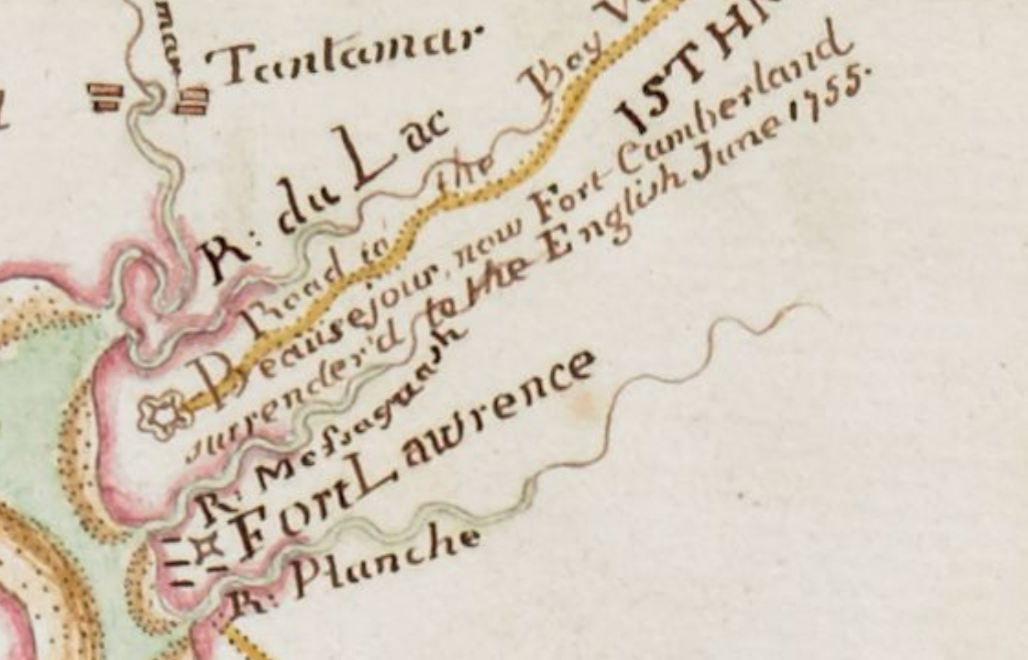
Battle of Beauséjour by Charles Morris (inset of A chart of the sea coasts of the peninsula of Nova Scotia, 1755)

Another important figure at Fort Beauséjour at this time was Thomas Pichon, who having originally studied medicine in France, was the Commander's secretary at Fort Beauséjour. When Fort Beauséjour was affected by an epidemic of food poisoning, Pichon traveled to Fort Lawrence to discuss his medical notes with the English surgeon. The conclusion was that a poisonous herb was being used in food, instead of the parsley the French thought they were using. From this, Pichon became friendly and on good terms with the English at Fort Lawrence, visiting the fort regularly as he felt that people did not recognize his value at Fort Beauséjour. Pichon did not trust either Commander Vergor or the priest Abbé Le Loutre who, while underneath Vergor in the hierarchy, was the real figure in charge. Pichon eventually met the commander at Fort Lawrence, Captain George Scott, and was hired as a spy. Pichon stated that he agreed to become a spy because he believed that the British nation was superior to the French nation, but it is more likely that he wanted monetary gain and despised his superiors at Fort Beauséjour. For a year preceding the Siege of Beauséjour, Pichon gave crucial military information such as maps and battle plans to the English. (Some Acadians also worked as spies for the British.) After the events of 1755, Thomas Pichon began his new life as Thomas Tyrell, a subject of King George II. Later in his life Pichon came to regret his treason against the French.

== Siege ==
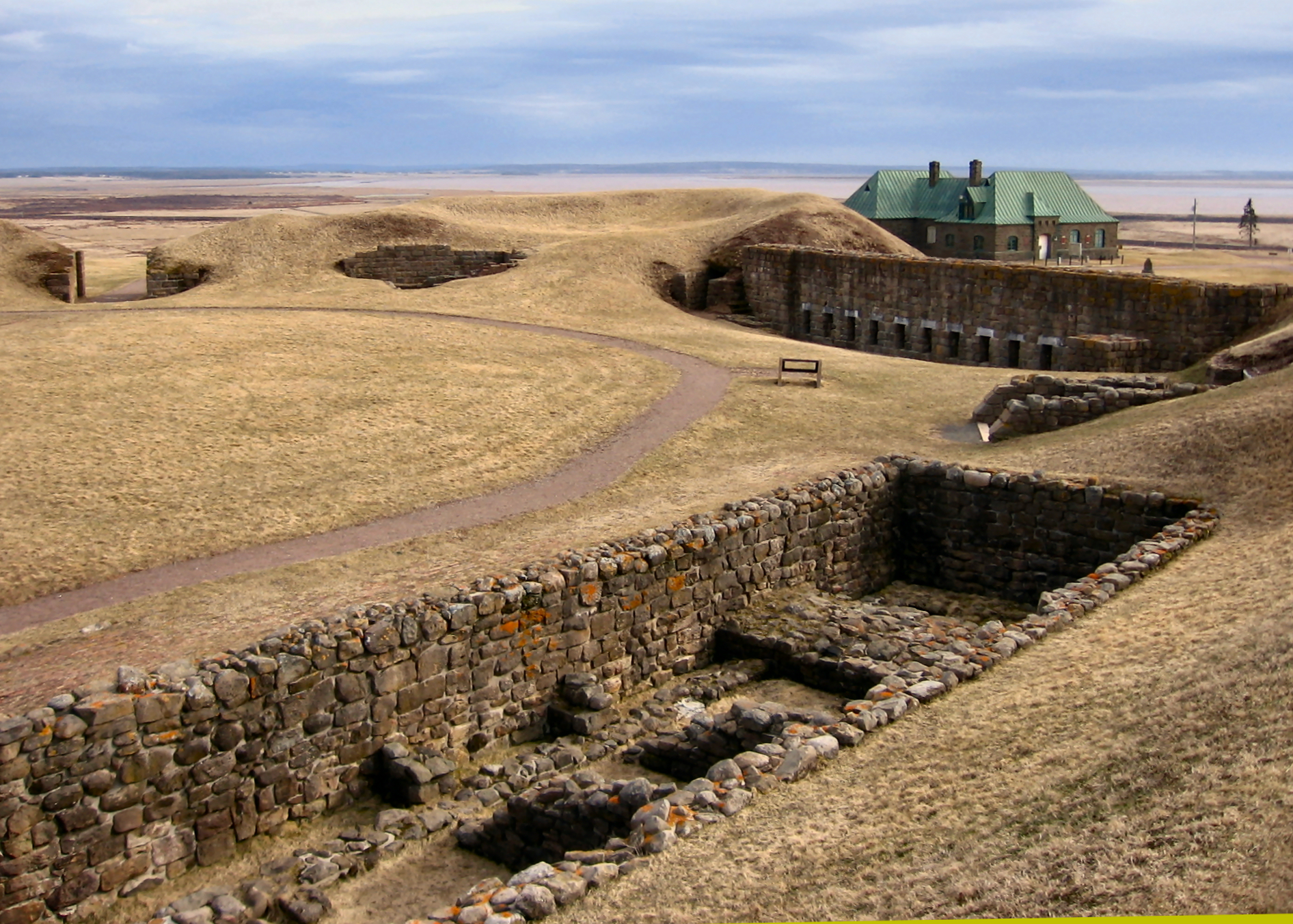
View of Fort Beauséjour showing the foundation of the Officers Quarters in the foreground, the modern (1930s) museum in the middle ground, and Cumberland Basin in the background. Monckton approached the fort from Aulac Ridge, which would be behind the observer.

Recruitment for an attack on Beauséjour was done by Colonel Shirley of Massachusetts. He was able to gather 2000 men, who would be led by Colonel Winslow, Lieutenant-Colonel George Scott, and Robert Monckton. The expedition left Boston on May 22, 1755, and arrived at Fort Lawrence on June 2, where an additional 400 men joined the expedition. The English expedition then started moving towards Fort Beauséjour on June 4. In the meantime, Vergor received news of the impending attack, and started to put defence measures into place. He first issued a call to arms to the surrounding Acadian population, who answered it begrudgingly. The Acadians asked their governor to threaten them, in order to be protected from execution for treason from the English. Fort Beauséjour had a maximum of a thousand men to defend it. At the same time, Vergor sent letters to Québec, Louisbourg, as well as settlements on the St. John river and on the Islands of St. John for help. He also sent a letter to Fort Gaspereau, which was located the closest to Fort Beauséjour. While Vergor was technically in charge of the fort, it was Jacau de Fiedmont who coordinated all of the defence plans and preparations for the attack. He was well aware that the only way Beauséjour would survive the siege would be by strengthening its defences. He was therefore insistent that the extra work be done before the English arrived. Other preparations included destroying roads and bridges.

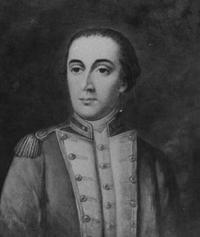
Captain Nicholas Cox, 47th Regiment

The first confrontation between the French settlers and soldiers of Fort Beauséjour and the English took place on June 4 at the Missaguash River. A total of 400 French, Acadian, and Indian men, faced off against British soldiers in battle formation. It was clear from the start that the Acadians were not good fighters and lacked fighting spirit and motivation, which would have given the English a strong sense of Fort Beauséjour's weaknesses, lack of ability, and deficiency of courage. After the confrontation, it was said that the English suffered a loss of eighty men, but this was most likely a fabricated number to boost the already low morale of the Acadians, as their aim was bad. The English started rebuilding the bridge over the Missaguash River which Vergor had destroyed under fire, and suffered no casualties.

The night of June 4, Vergor continued to put into place defence mechanisms, this time setting all of the surrounding buildings, shops, and homes on fire. This did nothing to improve the worsening morale of the Acadians, as these were their homes. Vergor, Abbé le Loutre, and Fiedmont were doing anything they could to improve the morale of the Acadians and of the soldiers. Vergor emphasizes the coming help from Louisbourg. Fiedmont also worried about the level of motivation of the Acadians, as he desperately needed them to work in order to continue to fortify the defenses. The few men he found who were willing to work were not nearly enough.

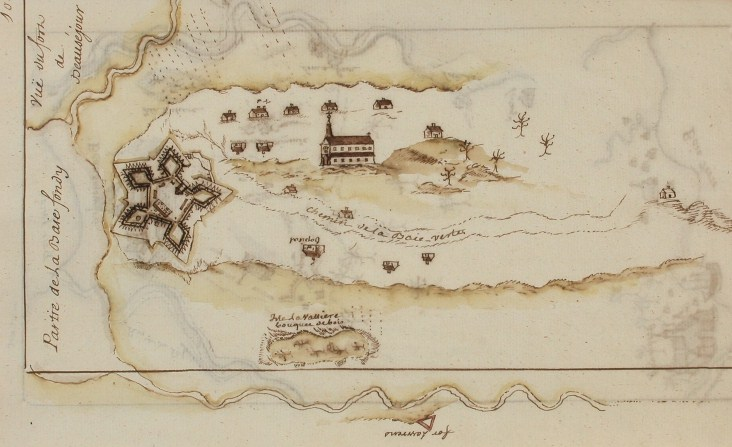
Fort Beauséjour and St. Louis Catholic Church (c. 1755)

On June 7 and 8, Native allies of the French had captured an English officer called Hay, and brought him to Fort Beauséjour as a prisoner, as well as an English deserter. The English officer made clear to the officers at Fort Beauséjour that the English had a very strong force and heavy artillery. On June 9, intense rain gave the Acadians yet another perfect excuse not to work on strengthening the defences, but no such excuse was used by the English, who continued to build their trenches and prepare to start the siege. On June 11, Fiedmont tried again to motivate the Acadians to finish the defences but no to avail. On June 12, an officer by the name of Vannes left with 180 men to attack Lieutenant Colonel Scott, but came back later that night without ever having fired a single shot. The entire situation definitely did not help raise the morale of his fellow officers and soldiers. The English started bombing Beauséjour on the June 13, with artillery that was much stronger than anything Beauséjour had. The men at Fort Beauséjour were rapidly losing what little morale they had left, and many Acadians were simply deserting.

On the June 14, Vergor received news that the port of Louisbourg was being blocked by the English, and could therefore not send help. As the general morale was already at its ultimate low, Vergor decided to keep this news secret. However, his valet, with whose wife Vergor was having an affair, overheard and spread the news. The next day, all of the Acadians and soldiers had completely lost any hope and morale they may have had left, and started pushing for capitulation. In fact, upon hearing this news, eighty men deserted Beauséjour. Desertion was quickly becoming such a problem that orders had to be put in place in order to forbid the men from speaking out about deserting.

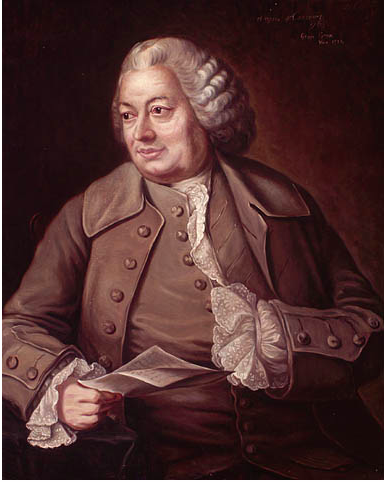
Thomas Pichon – a spy for the British who created the plan of attack used by Monckton

Many Acadians who had not participated in the fighting were becoming increasingly worried that they would be captured and sentenced to death by the English. Beauséjour continued to be bombed until the June 16, when one bomb in particular hit the officer's mess, killing a few French officers as well as the English prisoner Hay, who was the only Englishman to lose his life in the siege. The white flag of surrender was then raised, and the capitulation signed on June 16, 1755. The written capitulation included clauses which protected the Acadians, dictated what the English could take in terms of material goods from Beauséjour, and stated that the French could not bear arms in America for the next six months.

Fort Beauséjour was taken possession by the English at 7:30 p.m. on June 16. The English offered Fort Gaspereau the same conditions, which were immediately accepted and signed. Immediately after the Battle of Fort Beauséjour (1755), Robert Monckton sent a detachment under the command of John Rous to take Fort Menagoueche. De Boishebert knew that he faced a superior force so he burned the fort and retreated up the river to undertake guerrilla warfare. The destruction of Fort Menagoueche left Louisbourg as the last French fort in Acadia. Boishebert made his first strike in the Battle of Petitcodiac.

== Aftermath ==
The capture of Fort Beauséjour was a deciding factor in relations between the British Empire and the Acadian population of Nova Scotia. For decades Britain had been struggling to extract an oath of allegiance from the Acadians, who maintained that the "conventions of 1730" had secured their neutrality in all future Anglo-French conflicts. Such refusal, combined with French colonists' repeated attempts to incite rebellion among their fellow French-speakers, left British officials—especially Governor Charles Lawrence—increasingly wary of an attack from within.

The battle of Fort Beauséjour sealed the Acadians' fate both militarily and politically. With the fort's capture the French Catholics lost their only overland escape route to the mainland. Having also conceded their guns to Lawrence, the colonials were left "at the mercy of their British overlords." The British, meanwhile, discovered that several Acadians had participated in the defense of Beauséjour. Lawrence had enough evidence of some Acadians continuing to breach neutrality that he and the Council decided to solve the "festering Acadian problem" once and for all. On July 31, 1755, he ordered the forcible removal of the Acadian population from the colony.

Historians have debated the Empire's probable plans for Acadia prior to the taking of Beauséjour. By refusing to swear an oath of allegiance, Acadians had long resisted assimilation into a British Protestant mainstream. Lawrence's letters reveal a marked hostility toward the Acadians by 1754, at which point he was planning with Massachusetts Governor William Shirley to draw British battalions into Nova Scotia. As with many previous governors, Lawrence and Shirley had often discussed the possibility of removing the Acadians, but, before 1755, lacked the means for such measures. If not for General Edward Braddock's humiliating defeat that same year, Lawrence might have extended British control well beyond Acadia, eliminating the perceived need for mass deportation.

Fort Beauséjour was renamed Fort Cumberland by the British. It quickly became a major hub of Acadian expulsion, but saw little military activity during the rest of the Seven Years' War. The fort would face another siege with the 1776 Battle of Fort Cumberland during the American Revolution.

== Gallery ==
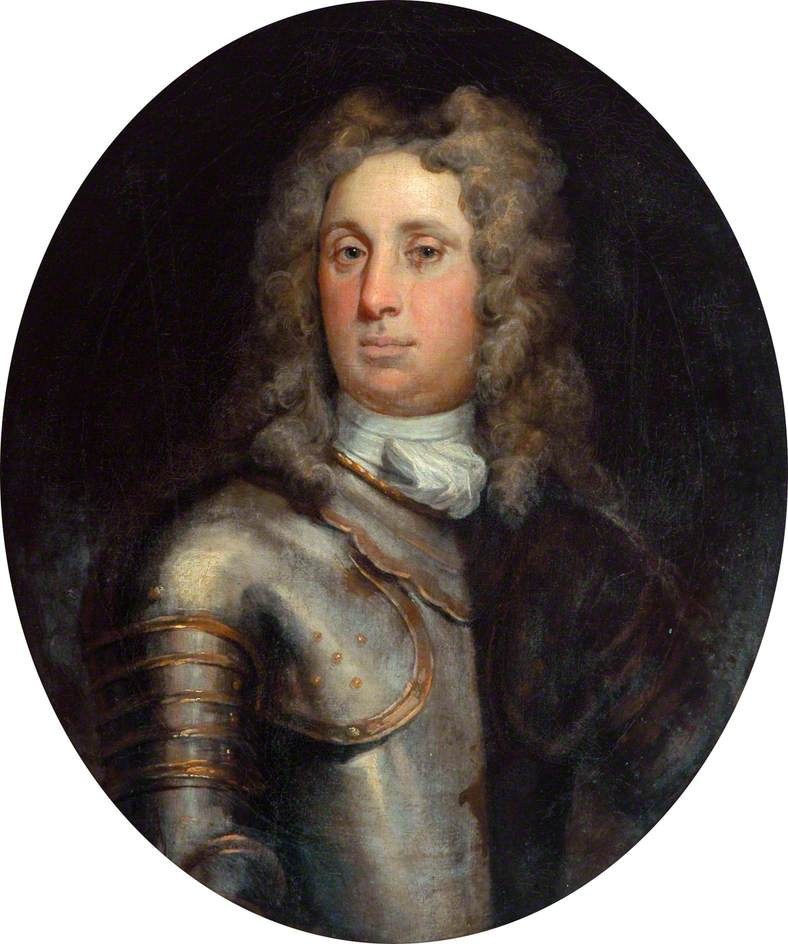
Peregrine Lascelles, commander of 47th regiment

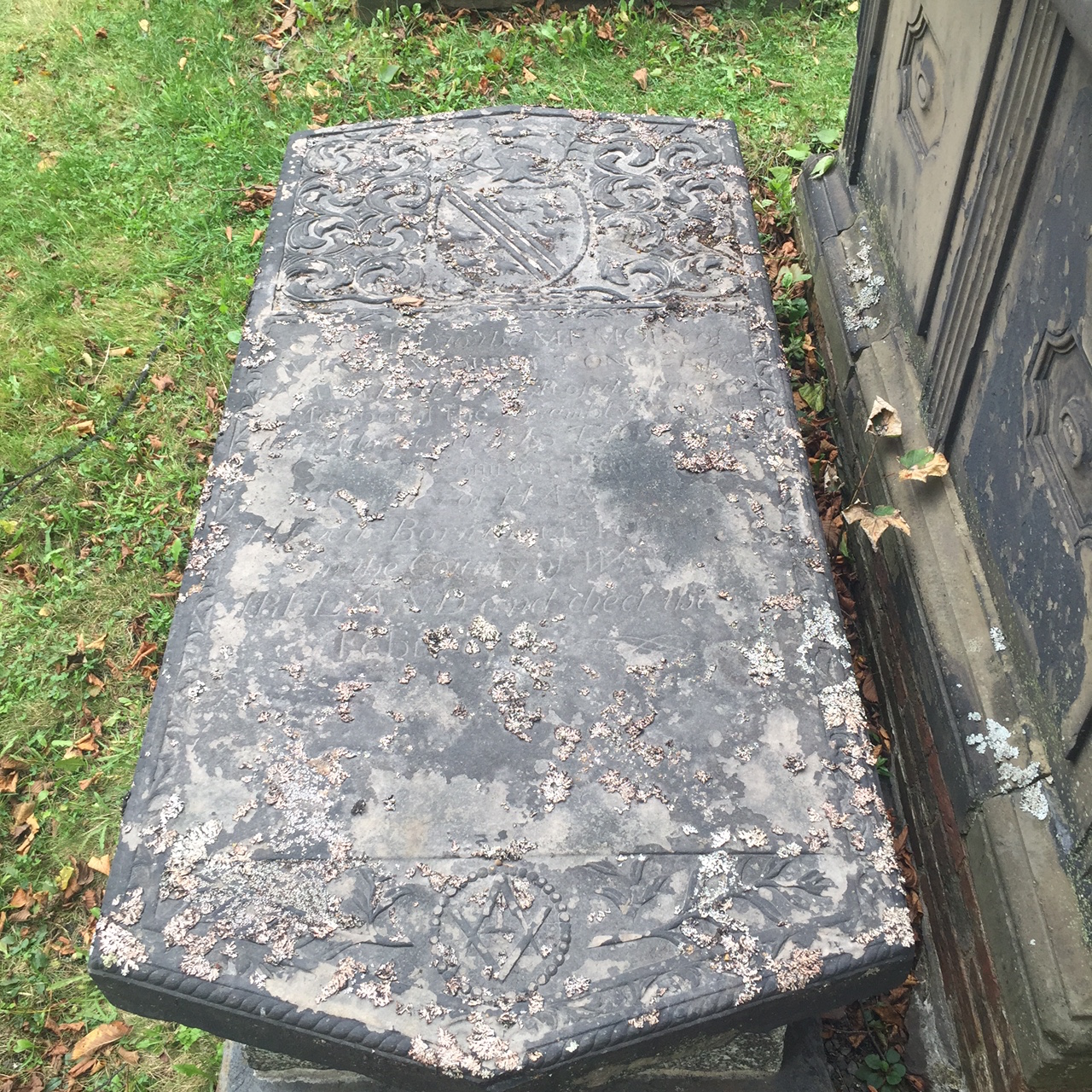
Winckworth Tonge fought in Battle, Old Burying Ground (Halifax, Nova Scotia)

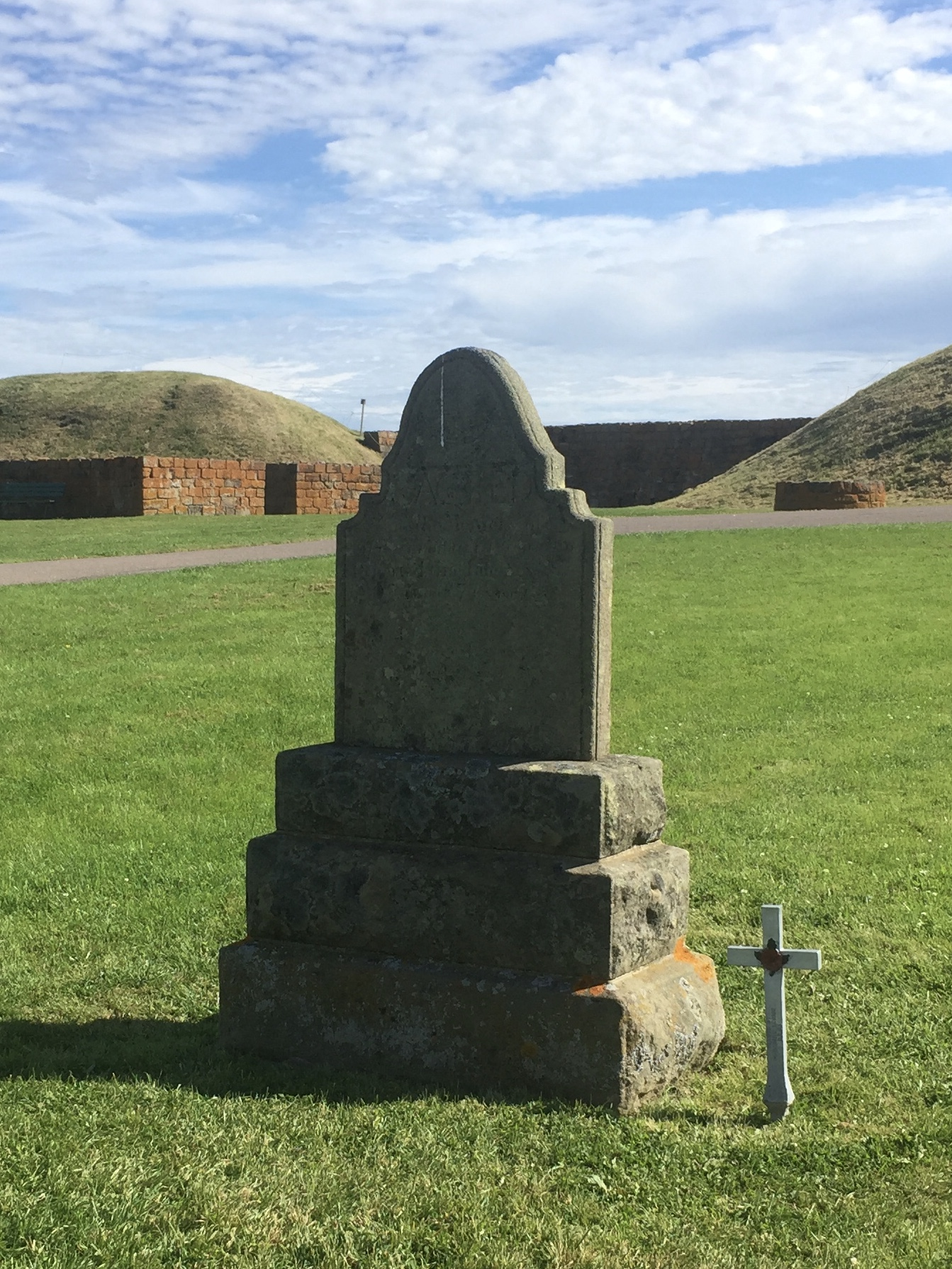
Thomas Dixson Grave, Fort Cumberland, New Brunswick

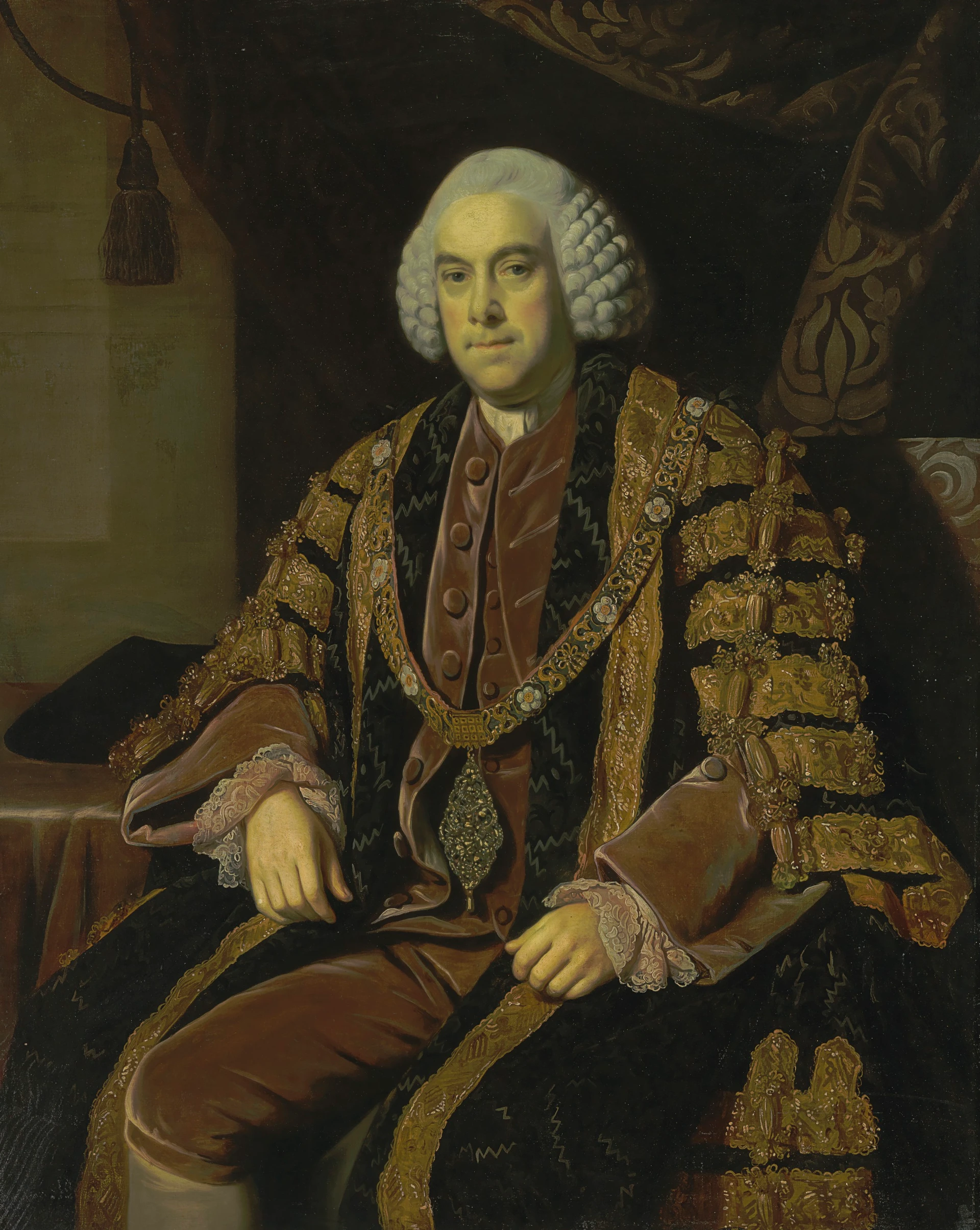
Brook Watson

== See also ==
- Military history of the Mi'kmaq people
- Military history of the Acadians
- History of New Brunswick
- Military history of Nova Scotia
