= HMS Sutherland (1741) =

Ship of the line of the Royal Navy

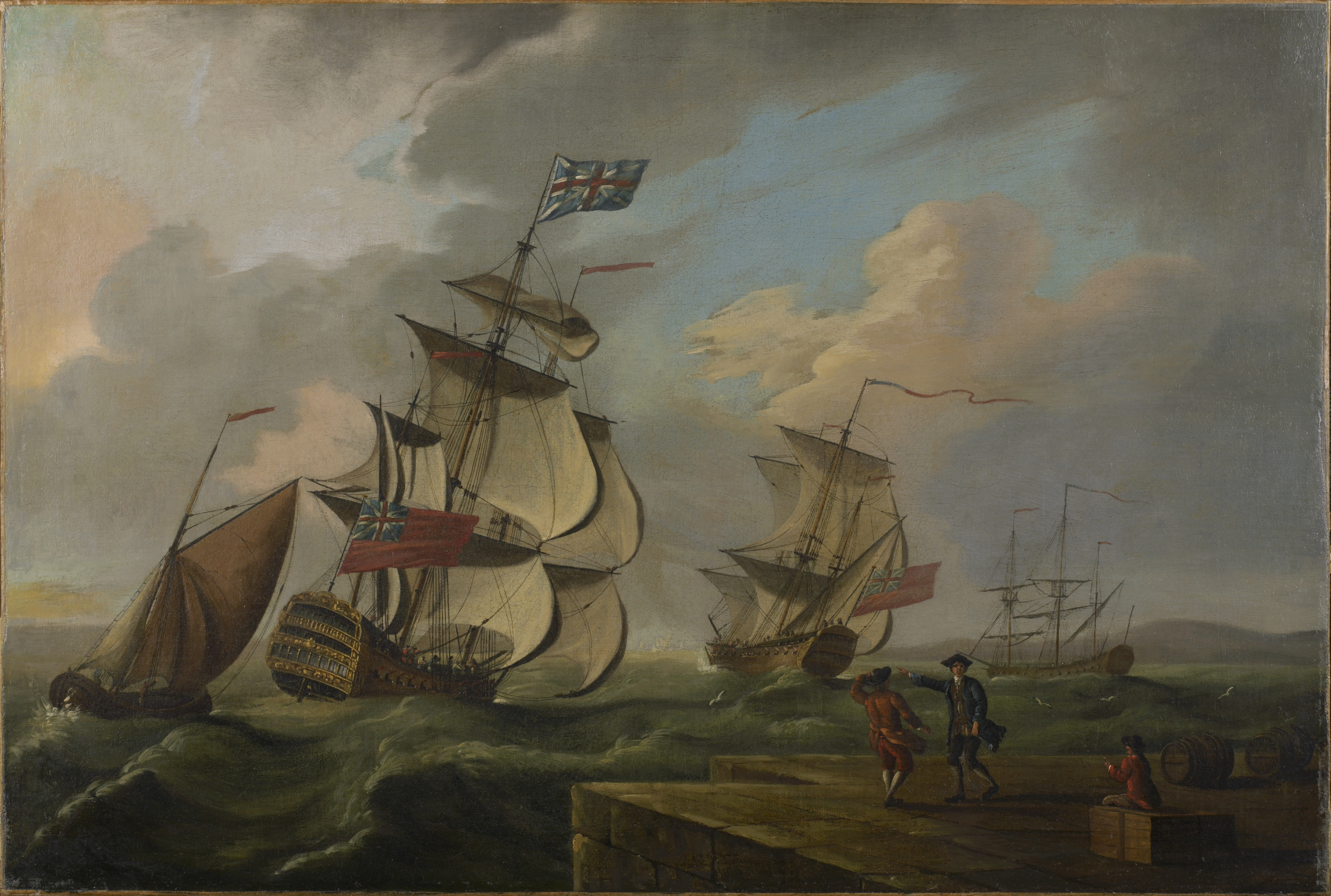
- HMS Sutherland sailed by John Rous during the Siege of Louisbourg (1758)

History

Great Britain
- Name: HMS Sutherland
- Ordered: 28 April 1740
- Builder: Taylor, Rotherhithe
- Launched: 15 October 1741
- Fate: Sold, 1770

General characteristics
- Class & type: 1733 proposals 50-gun fourth rate ship of the line
- Tons burthen: 873
- Length: 134 ft (40.8 m) (gundeck)
- Beam: 38 ft 6 in (11.7 m)
- Depth of hold: 15 ft 9 in (4.8 m)
- Propulsion: Sails
- Sail plan: Full-rigged ship
- Armament: 50 guns: Gundeck: 22 × 18 pdrs; Upper gundeck: 22 × 9 pdrs; Quarterdeck: 4 × 6 pdrs; Forecastle: 2 × 6 pdrs

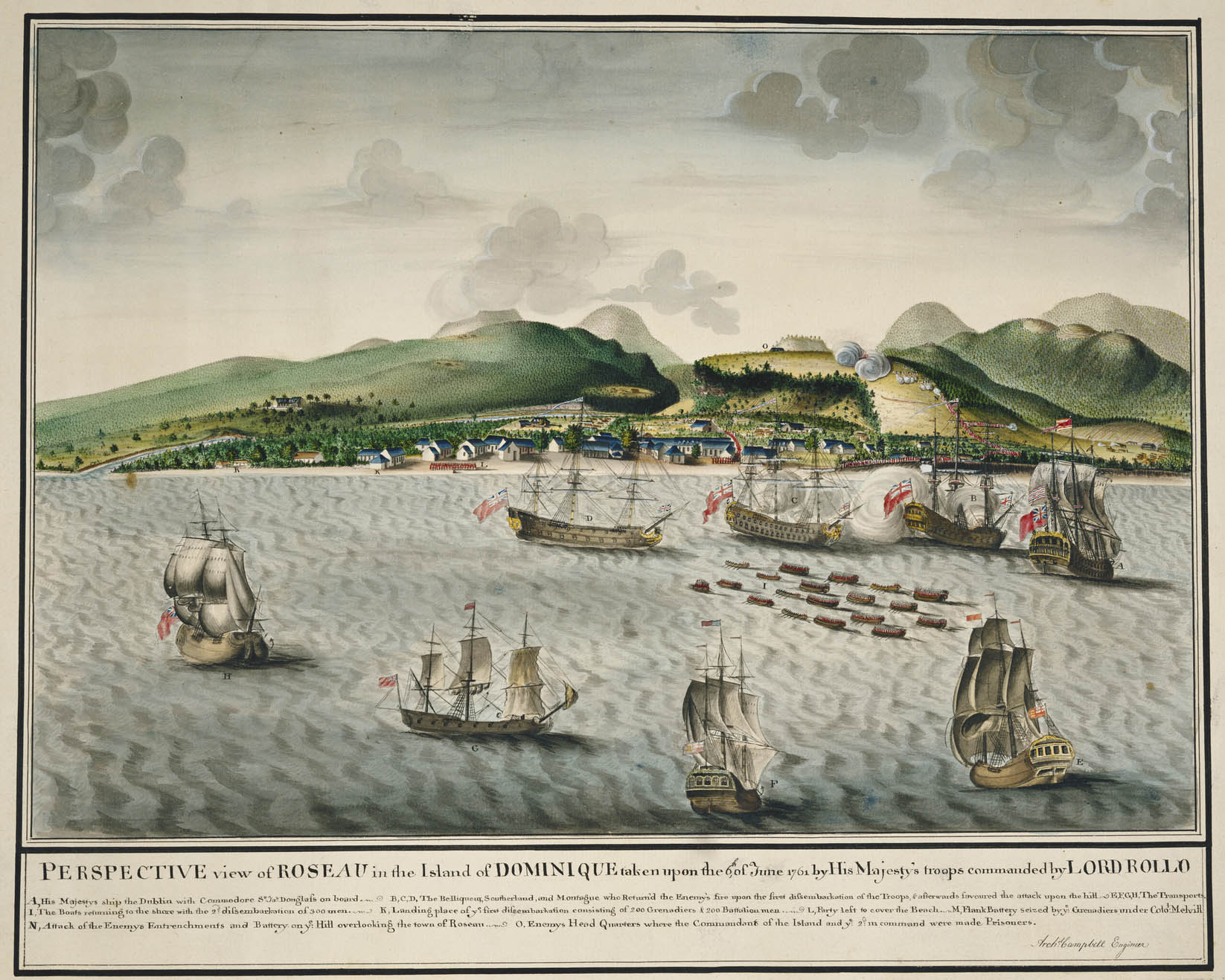
Sutherland at Roseau, Dominica in 1761

HMS Sutherland was a 50-gun fourth rate ship of the line of the Royal Navy, built at Rotherhithe according to the dimensions laid out in the 1733 proposals of the 1719 Establishment, and launched on 15 October 1741.

Sutherland participated in the Siege of Louisbourg (1758), providing shore bombardment for the forces of Brigadier-General James Wolfe.

Sutherland was sold out of the navy in 1770.
