= Raffetot =

- Commune
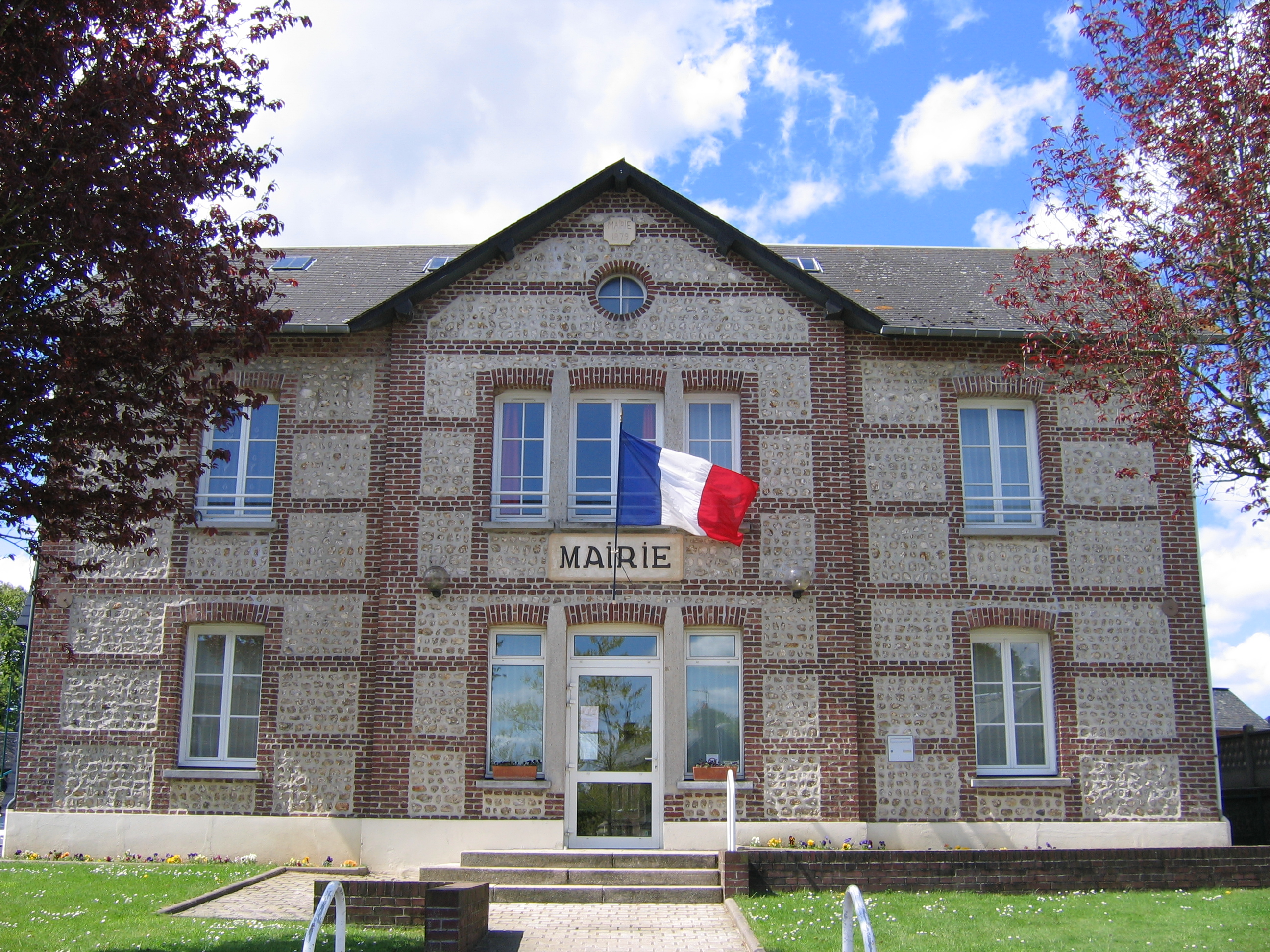
- The town hall in Raffetot
- Location of Raffetot
- Location within France Location within Normandy
- Coordinates: 49°36′03″N 0°30′55″E
- Country: France
- Region: Normandy
- Department: Seine-Maritime
- Arrondissement: Le Havre
- Canton: Bolbec
- Intercommunality: Caux Seine Agglo

Government
  - Mayor (2026–32): Bruno Cadiou
- Area^{1}: 6.85 km^{2} (2.64 sq mi)
- Elevation: 136 m (446 ft)
- Highest elevation: 144 m (472 ft)
- Lowest elevation: 127 m (417 ft)
- Population (2023): 529
  - Density: 77.2/km^{2} (200/sq mi)
- Time zone: UTC+01:00 (CET)
  - Summer (DST): UTC+02:00 (CEST)
- INSEE/Postal code: 76518 /76210
- ^{1} French Land Register data, which excludes lakes, ponds, glaciers > 1 km^{2} (0.386 sq mi or 247 acres) and river estuaries.

Raffetot (French pronunciation: [ʁafto]) is a commune in the Seine-Maritime department in the Normandy region in northern France.

== Geography ==
A farming village in the Pays de Caux, situated some 21 miles (34 km) northeast of Le Havre, sandwiched between the D30 road and the A29 autoroute.

== Population ==
Historical population
Year	Pop.	±% p.a.
1968	399	—
1975	373	−0.96%
1982	427	+1.95%
1990	467	+1.13%
1999	475	+0.19%
2007	457	−0.48%
2012	498	+1.73%
2017	503	+0.20%
2023	529	+0.84%
Source: INSEE

== Places of interest ==
- The church of St. Anne, dating from the thirteenth century.

== See also ==
- Communes of the Seine-Maritime department
