= John Rous =

Royal Navy officer and privateer (1702–1760)

Captain John Rous
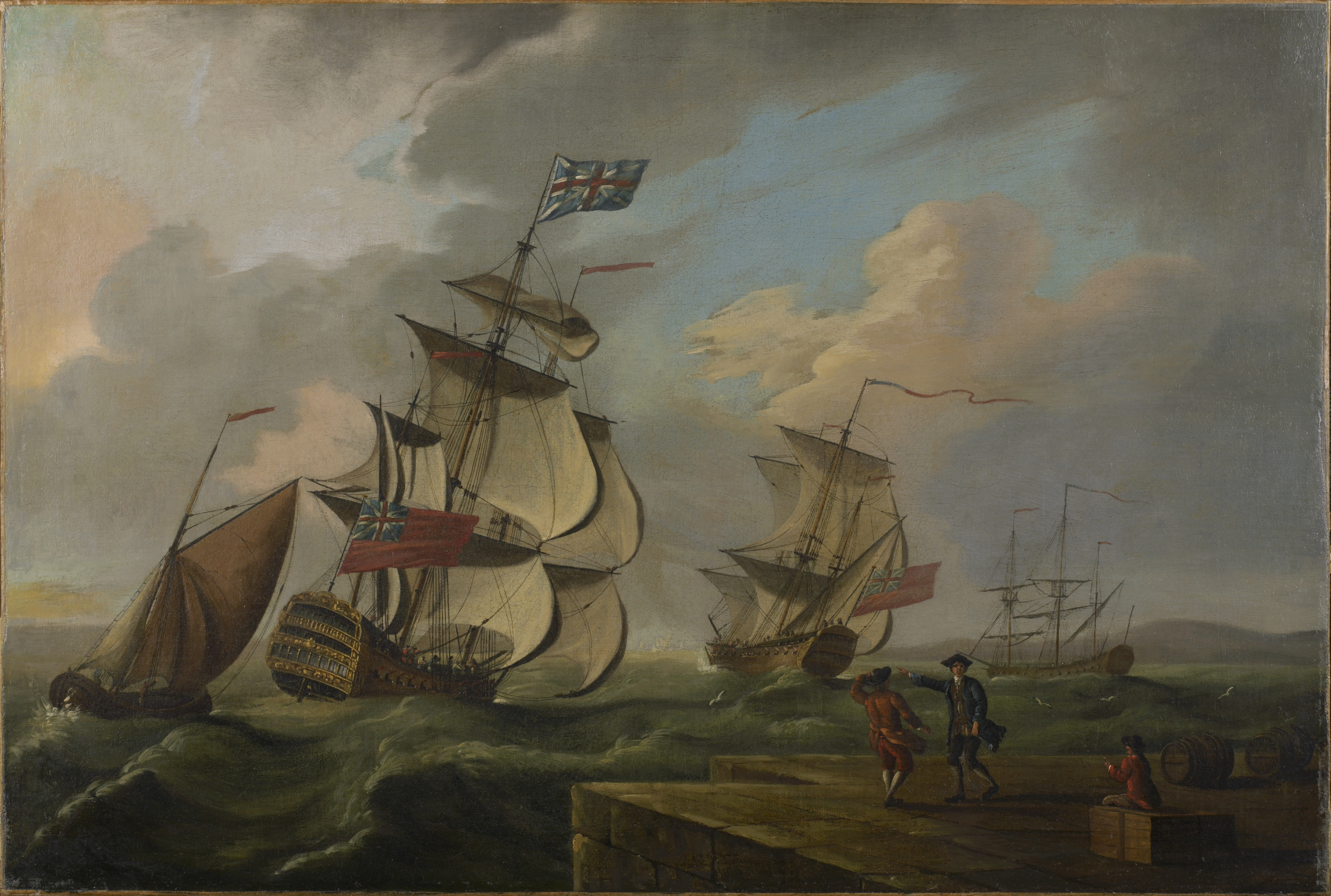
- HMS Sutherland sailed by Rous during the siege of Louisbourg
- Born: 21 May 1702; Charlestown, Massachusetts
- Died: 3 April 1760 (aged 57); Portsmouth, Hampshire
- Burial place: St Thomas's Church, Portsmouth
- Military career
- Allegiance: Kingdom of Great Britain
- Branch: Royal Navy
- Service years: 1745–1760
- Rank: Captain
- Commands: HMS Shirley; HMS Albany; HMS Success; HMS Sutherland
- Conflicts: King George's War; Newfoundland Campaign; Siege of Louisbourg; Capture of the Vigilant; Battle at Port-la-Joye; Father Le Loutre's War; Battle at Chignecto; French and Indian War; Battle of Fort Beauséjour; Siege of Louisbourg; Battle of the Plains of Abraham

John Rous (21 May 1702 – 3 April 1760) was a Royal Navy officer and privateer. He served during King George's War and the French and Indian War. Rous was also the senior naval officer on the Nova Scotia station during Father Le Loutre's War. Rous' daughter Mary married Richard Bulkeley and is buried in the Old Burying Ground in Halifax, Nova Scotia.

== Family and early life ==
Rous was born in Charlestown, Middlesex, Massachusetts on 21 May 1702, to William Rouse (Rows) and Mary, née Peachie.

== King George's War ==
He became a privateer during King George's War, part of the War of the Austrian Succession carried out in the North American colonies of Britain and France. He appears to have been in the navy in April and May 1740, serving as master's mate aboard the 50-gun HMS Ruby. ON the ship Young Eagle, he made raids on the French fishing fleets and ports on the north shore of Newfoundland. He went on to command his own privateer ship, the 20-gun snow Shirley, serving as second in command of the New England naval forces at the Siege of Louisbourg in 1745.

On 19 May 1745 he came to the assistance of HMS Mermaid, which was engaged with the 64-gun French Vigilante. He was the first to render assistance, and the French ship was duly captured. Rous was rewarded for his efforts by Rear-Admiral Sir Peter Warren, who ordered Vigilante be purchased for the navy, and appointed Rous third lieutenant of her on 22 June 1745. Rous remained as captain of the Shirley and was sent to London in July, carrying Warren's dispatches. Warren purchased the Shirley on her return, and on 24 September 1745 Rous was appointed a captain and given command of her. He was present at the Battle at Port-la-Joye.

In September 1746 with Annapolis Royal under threat of attack by the remnants of Duc d'Anville's fleet, Captain Rous, commanding the Shirley, was ordered to assist in the defence of the fort. There he along with Captain Richard Spry "agreed to haul their ships under the Fort upon the arrival of the fleet and land their men and guns for the defence of it." In 1747, after the Battle of Grand Pré, Rous sailed for the Minas Basin with a detachment under the command of Captain John Winslow, to re-establish British control over the area. The Shirley was paid off in June 1747, and on 7 May 1749 he took over the 14-gun HMS Albany.

== Father Le Loutre's War ==
Rous was also the senior naval officer on the Nova Scotia station during Father Le Loutre's War (1749–1755). The main officer under his command was Silvanus Cobb. He made a significant contribution to the preservation of Halifax and the defeat of the French, Acadian and Mi'kmaq resistance. He commanded the Albany. As the admiralty did not provide effective naval forces for the defence of Nova Scotia, Rous improvised to establish and protect the new British settlements at Halifax, Lunenburg, and Lawrencetown. He also worked to protect the long established British settlements at Canso and Annapolis Royal, as well as the new British forts in the Acadian communities of Grand Pre (Fort Vieux Logis), Pisiquid (Fort Edward) and Chignecto (see Battle at Chignecto). Under his command were three 14-gun sloops of the Royal Navy, the occasional man-of-war from England, and several New England coasting vessels.

In 1753, Rous was a member of the Nova Scotia Council. From 1754 to 1757 he had command of the 20-gun HMS Success, and in 1755 led the naval force at the Battle of Fort Beauséjour.

== French and Indian War ==
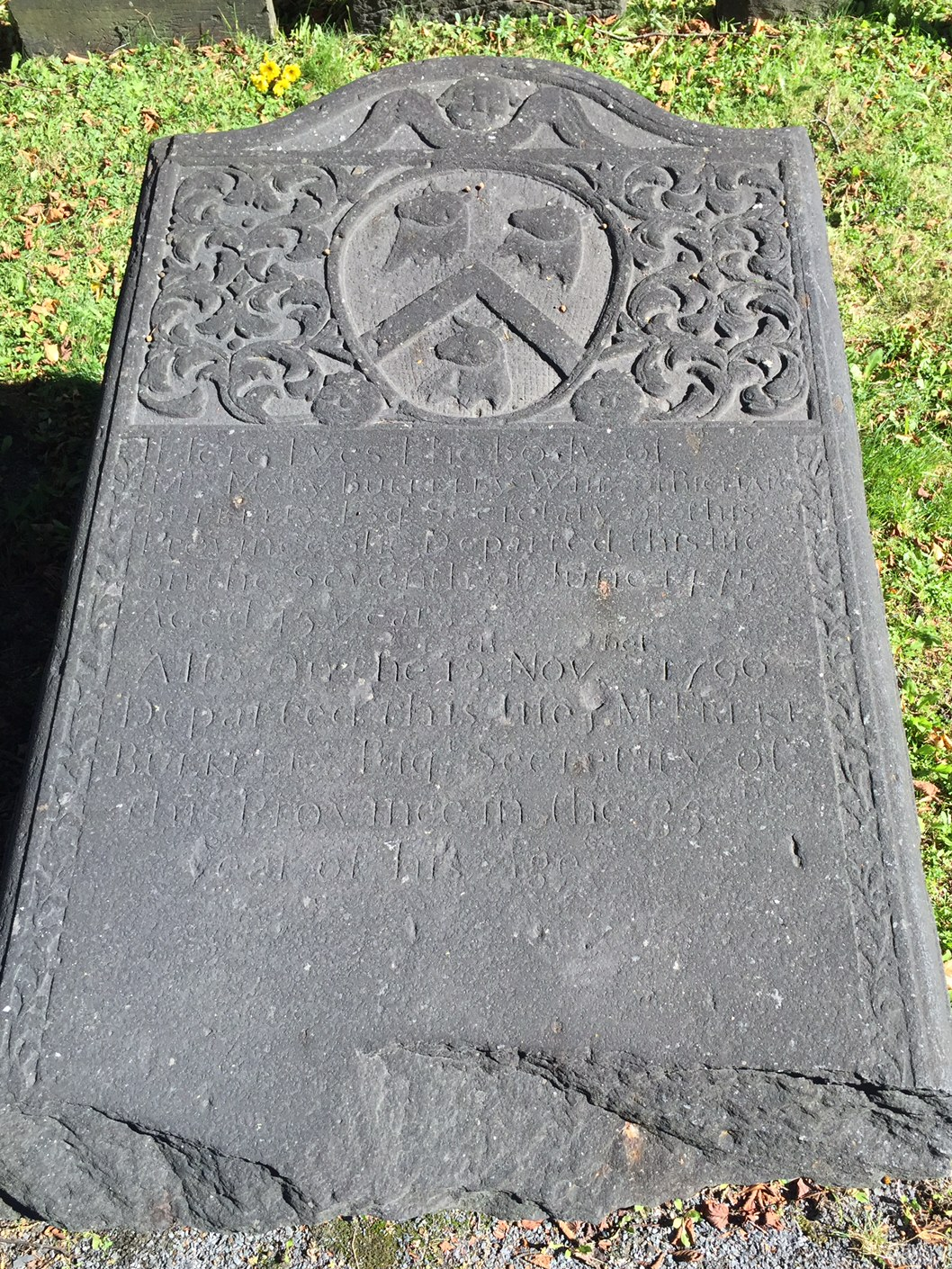
John Rous's daughter, Mary (Rous) Bulkeley, Old Burying Ground (Halifax, Nova Scotia)

He saw further service during the Seven Years' War, joining the preparations for an attack on Louisbourg in 1757. The attempt was abandoned, but Rous became captain of the 50-gun HMS Sutherland and saw action at the successful siege in 1758. He went on to take part at the capture of Quebec in 1759, leading Admiral Sir Charles Saunders's fleet up the river, and landing troops for the attack under General James Wolfe. He returned to England in late 1759 with a convoy, and died at Portsmouth on 3 April 1760. He was buried at St Thomas's Church on 6 April 1760.

== Legacy ==
There are a number of landmarks in Mahone Bay, Nova Scotia named after him: Rous Island, Rous Point and Rous Shoal.

== See also ==
- Military history of Nova Scotia
- Military history of the Mi’kmaq People
- Military history of the Acadians
