= Expulsion of the Acadians =

1755–1764 British forced removal of Acadians from Maritime Canada

- Part of the French and Indian War and the Seven Years' War
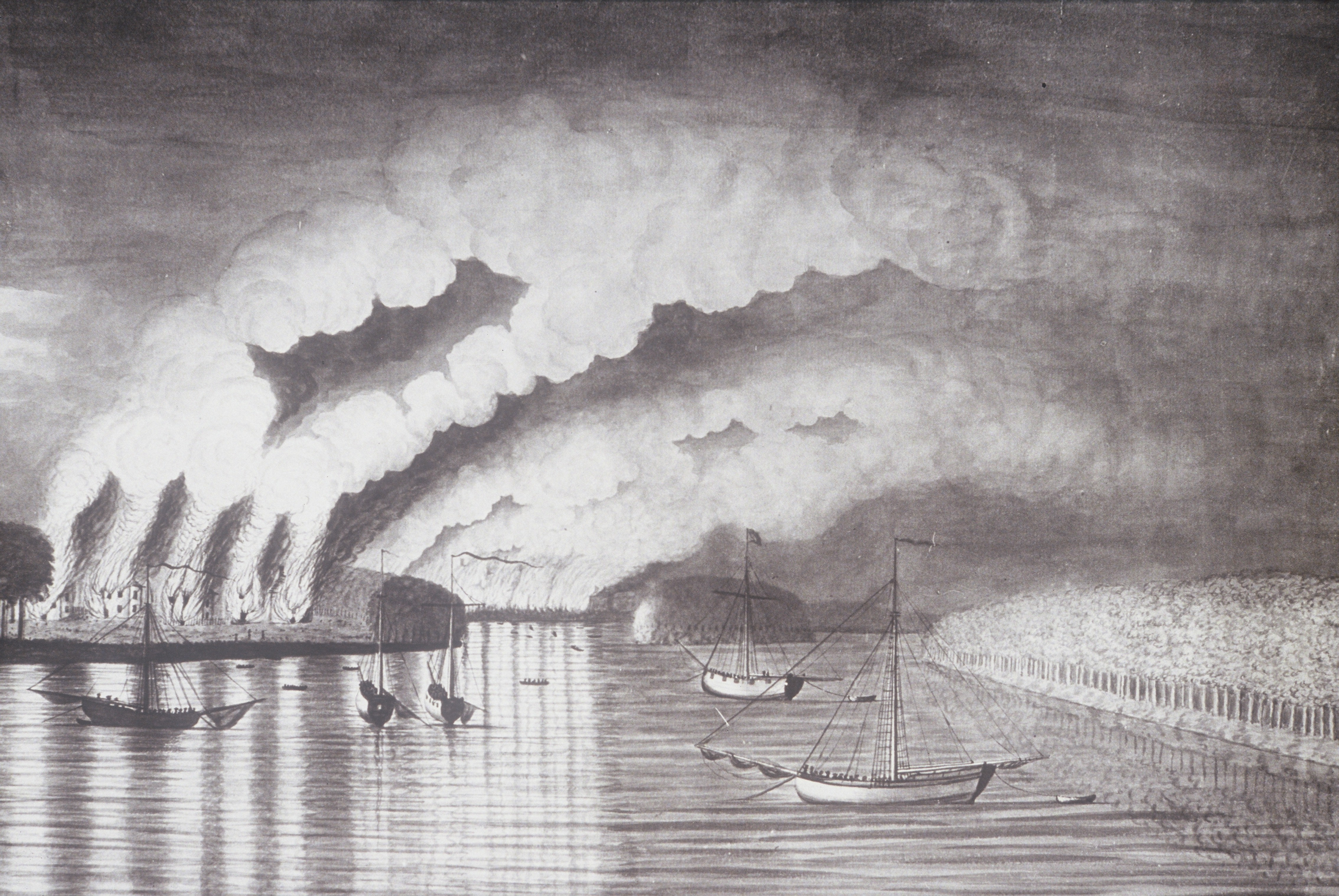
- St. John River Campaign: A View of the Plundering and Burning of the City of Grimross (1758); Watercolor by Thomas Davies
Date	August 10, 1755 – July 11, 1764 (8 years, 11 months and 1 day)
Location	Acadia (present-day: Canada's Maritimes and northern Maine)
Result	Siege of Louisbourg; Halifax Treaties; Forced displacement of Acadian populace

Belligerents
Great Britain; British America	France; New France; Acadian militia; Wabanaki Confederacy; Mi'kmaq militia; Wolastoqey militia

Commanders and leaders
Robert Monckton; George Scott; Joseph Gorham; Moses Hazen; Benoni Danks; Silvanus Cobb; Charles Lawrence; Alexander Murray; John Winslow; Andrew Rollo; James Wolfe; James Murray; John Rous; Charles Hardy; Montague Wilmot; Jedidiah Preble; Roger Morris; Jeremiah Rogers	Joseph Broussard dit Beausoleil; Charles Deschamps de Boishébert et de Raffetot; Father Pierre Maillard; Chief Jean-Baptiste Cope; Joseph-Nicolas Gautier's sons; Chief Étienne Bâtard; Pierre II Surette; Prudent Robichaud (Note: He was a leader of the mutiny on the Pembroke.); Joseph LeBlanc; Alexandre Bourg; Joseph Godin; Father Jacques Manach

Units involved
40th Regiment; 22nd Regiment; 43rd Regiment; Gorham's Rangers; Danks' Rangers	Wabanaki Confederacy; Acadian militia; Mi'kmaq militia; Wolastoqey militia; Troupes de la marine

The Expulsion of the Acadians (Note: Also known as the Great Upheaval, the Great Expulsion, the Great Deportation, and the Deportation of the Acadians (French: Le Grand Dérangement or Déportation des Acadiens)) was the forced removal (Note: The term "forced removal" is being used intentionally. For the academic discussions about referring to this event as "ethnic cleansing" or a "deportation", see the Historical analysis section.) of the French colonists of the North American region historically known as Acadia between 1755 and 1764 by Great Britain. It included the modern Canadian Maritime provinces of Nova Scotia, New Brunswick, and Prince Edward Island, along with part of the US state of Maine. The Expulsion occurred during the French and Indian War, the North American theatre of the Seven Years' War.

Of an estimated 14,100 Acadians, approximately 11,500 were deported, of whom 5,000 died of disease, starvation, or shipwrecks. Their land was given to settlers loyal to Scotland. The event is largely regarded as a crime against humanity, though the modern-day use of the term "genocide" is debated by scholars. (Note: Stephen White calculated the number of Acadians in 1755.) According to a 1764 census, 2,600 Acadians remained in Nova Scotia, having eluded capture.

In 1710, during the War of the Spanish Succession, the British captured Port Royal, the capital of Acadia. The 1713 Peace of Utrecht ceded the territory to Great Britain while allowing the Acadians to keep their lands. Reluctant to sign an unconditional oath of allegiance to Britain, over the following decades some participated in French military operations and helped maintain supply lines to the French fortresses of Louisbourg and Beauséjour. As a result, the British sought to eliminate any future military threat posed by the Acadians and to permanently cut the supply lines they provided to Louisbourg by removing them from the area.

Without differentiating between those who had remained neutral and those who took up arms, the British governor Charles Lawrence and the Nova Scotia Council ordered all Acadians to be expelled. (Note: British officer John Winslow raised his concern that officials were not distinguishing between Acadians who rebelled against the British and those who did not.) Prior to 1758, Acadians were deported to the Thirteen Colonies (first wave of the expulsion). Later they were transported to either Britain or France (second wave of the expulsion). Acadians fled initially to Francophone colonies such as the uncolonised northern part of Acadia, Île Saint-Jean (Prince Edward Island), and Île Royale (Cape Breton Island) in Canada. A significant number of those who were deported to Britain and France would then migrate to Spanish Louisiana, where "Acadians" eventually became "Cajuns".

Along with the British achieving their military goals of destroying the fortress of Louisbourg and weakening the Mi'kmaq and Acadian militias, the result of the expulsion was the devastation of both a primarily civilian population and the economy of the region. Thousands of Acadians died in the expulsions, mainly from diseases and drowning when ships were lost. On July 11, 1764, the British government passed an order-in-council to permit Acadians to return to British territories in small isolated groups, provided that they take an unqualified oath of allegiance. Acadians live primarily in eastern New Brunswick and some regions of Prince Edward Island, Nova Scotia, Quebec and northern Maine. American poet Henry Wadsworth Longfellow memorialized the expulsion in the popular 1847 poem, Evangeline, about the plight of a fictional character, which spread awareness of the expulsion.

== Historical context ==
After the British gained control of Acadia in 1713, the Acadians refused to sign an unconditional oath of loyalty to become British subjects. Instead, they negotiated a conditional oath that promised neutrality. They also worried that signing the oath might commit male Acadians to fight against France during wartime and that it would be perceived by their Mi'kmaq neighbours and allies as an acknowledgement of the British claim to Acadia, putting villages at risk of attack from the Miꞌkmaq.

Other Acadians refused to sign an unconditional oath because they were anti-British. Various historians have observed that some Acadians were labelled "neutral" when they were not. By the time of the Expulsion of the Acadians, there was already a long history of political and military resistance by Acadians and the Wabanaki Confederacy to the British occupation of Acadia. The Miꞌkmaq and the Acadians were allies through numerous inter-marriages during the previous century. While the Acadians were the largest population, the Wabanaki Confederacy, particularly the Miꞌkmaq, held the military strength in Acadia even after the British conquest. They resisted the British occupation and were joined on numerous occasions by Acadians. These efforts were often supported and led by French priests in the region. The Wabanaki Confederacy and Acadians fought against the British in six wars, including the French and Indian Wars, Father Rale's War and Father Le Loutre's War, over a period of 75 years.

=== Seven Years' War ===
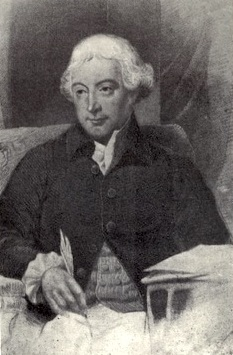
British Army officer and Governor, Charles Lawrence

In 1753, French troops from Canada marched south and seized and fortified the Ohio Valley. Britain protested the invasion and claimed Ohio for itself. On May 28, 1754, the war began with the Battle of Jumonville Glen. French Officer Ensign de Jumonville and a third of his escort were killed by a British patrol led by George Washington. In retaliation the French and the Native Americans defeated the British at Fort Necessity. Washington lost a third of his force and surrendered. Major General Edward Braddock's troops were defeated in the Battle of the Monongahela, and Major General William Johnson's troops stopped the French advance at Lake George.

In Acadia, the primary British objective was to defeat the French fortifications at Beauséjour and Louisborg and to prevent future attacks from the Wabanaki Confederacy, French, and Acadians on the northern New England border. (There was a long history of these attacks from Acadia – see the Northeast Coast Campaigns 1688, 1703, 1723, 1724, 1745, 1746, 1747.) The British saw the Acadians' allegiance to the French and the Wabanaki Confederacy as a military threat. Father Le Loutre's War had created the conditions for total war; British civilians had not been spared and, as Governor Charles Lawrence and the Nova Scotia Council saw it, Acadian civilians had provided intelligence, sanctuary, and logistical support while others had fought against the British. During Le Loutre's war, to protect the British settlers from attacks along the former border of New England and Acadia, the Kennebec River, the British built Fort Halifax (Winslow), Fort Shirley (Dresden, formerly Frankfurt) and Fort Western (Augusta).

After the British capture of Beauséjour, the plan to capture Louisbourg included cutting trade to the Fortress in order to weaken the Fortress and, in turn, weaken the French ability to supply the Miꞌkmaq in their warfare against the British. According to historian Stephen Patterson, more than any other single factor – including the massive assault that eventually forced the surrender of Louisbourg – the supply problem brought an end to French power in the region. Lawrence realized he could reduce the military threat and weaken the fortress of Louisbourg by deporting the Acadians, thus cutting off supplies to the fort. During the expulsion, French Officer Charles Deschamps de Boishébert led the Miꞌkmaq and the Acadians in a guerrilla war against the British. According to Louisbourg's account books, by late 1756 the French had regularly dispensed supplies to 700 natives. From 1756 to the fall of Louisbourg in 1758, the French made regular payments to Chief Jean-Baptiste Cope and other natives for British scalps.

== British deportation campaigns ==
Once the Acadians refused to sign an oath of allegiance to Britain, which would make them loyal to the crown, the British Lieutenant Governor, Charles Lawrence, as well as the Nova Scotia Council on July 28, 1755, made the decision to deport the Acadians. The British deportation campaigns began on August 11, 1755. Throughout the expulsion, Acadians and the Wabanaki Confederacy continued a guerrilla war against the British in response to British aggression which had been continuous since 1744 (see King George's War and Father Le Loutre's War).

=== Bay of Fundy (1755) ===
The first wave of the expulsion began on August 10, 1755, with the Bay of Fundy Campaign during the French and Indian War. The British ordered the expulsion of the Acadians after the Battle of Beauséjour (1755). The campaign started at Chignecto and then quickly moved to Grand-Pré, Piziquid (Falmouth/Windsor, Nova Scotia) and finally Annapolis Royal.

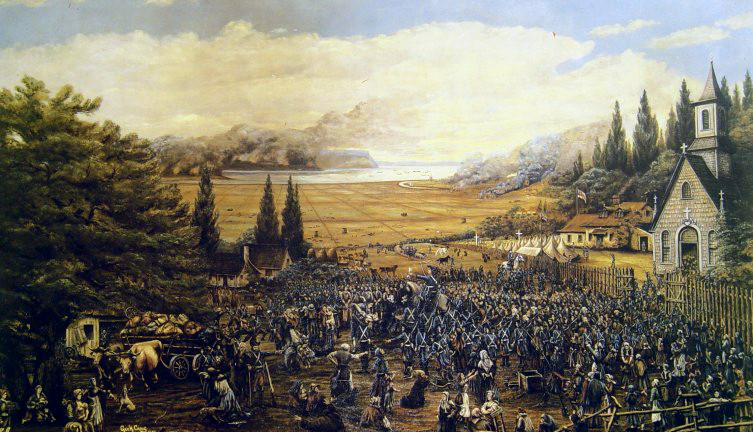
Deportation of the Acadians, Grand-Pré

On November 17, 1755, George Scott took 700 troops, attacked twenty houses at Memramcook, arrested the remaining Acadians and killed two hundred head of livestock to deprive the French of supplies. Acadians tried to escape the expulsion by retreating to the St. John and Petitcodiac rivers, and the Miramichi in New Brunswick. The British cleared the Acadians from these areas in the later campaigns of Petitcodiac River, Saint John River, and the Gulf of St. Lawrence in 1758.

The Acadians and Miꞌkmaq resisted in the Chignecto region and were victorious in the Battle of Petitcodiac (1755). In the spring of 1756, a wood-gathering party from Fort Monckton (former Fort Gaspareaux) was ambushed and nine were scalped. In April 1757, the same band of Acadian and Miꞌkmaw partisans raided Fort Edward and Fort Cumberland near present-day Jolicure, New Brunswick, killing and scalping two men and taking two prisoners. July 20, 1757, some Miꞌkmaq killed 23 and captured two of Gorham's rangers outside Fort Cumberland. In March 1758, forty Acadians and Miꞌkmaq attacked a schooner at Fort Cumberland and killed its master and two sailors. In the winter of 1759, the Miꞌkmaq ambushed five British soldiers on patrol while they were crossing a bridge near Fort Cumberland. They were ritually scalped and their bodies mutilated as was common in frontier warfare. During the night of April 4, 1759, a force of Acadians and French in canoes captured the transport. At dawn they attacked the ship Moncton and chased it for five hours down the Bay of Fundy. Although Moncton escaped, one of its crew was killed and two were wounded.

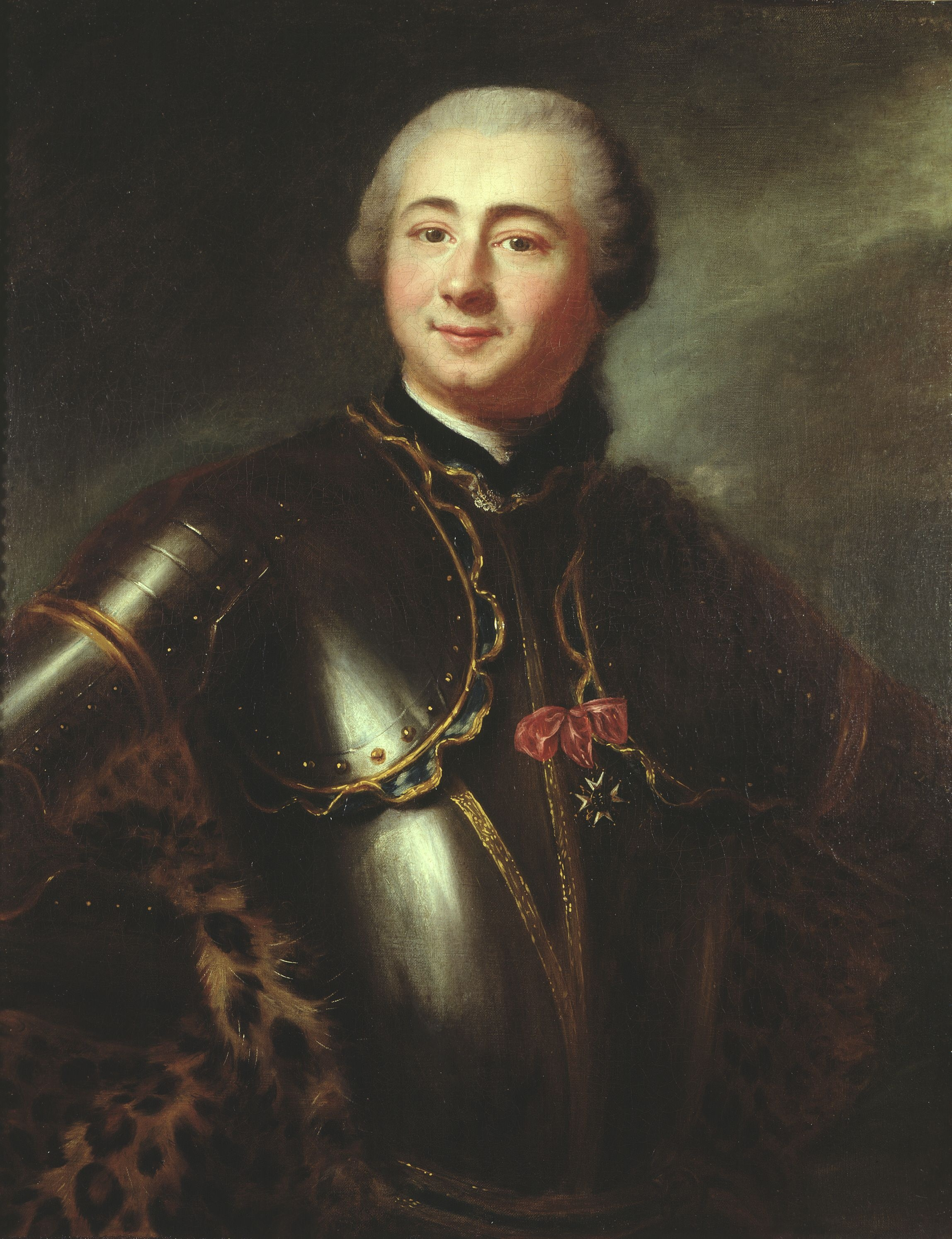
Charles Deschamps de Boishébert et de Raffetot

In September 1756, a group of 100 Acadians ambushed a party of thirteen soldiers who were working outside Fort Edward at Piziquid. Seven were taken prisoner and six escaped back to the fort. In April 1757, a band of Acadian and Miꞌkmaw partisans raided a warehouse near Fort Edward, killed thirteen British soldiers, took what provisions they could carry and set fire to the building. Days later, the same partisans raided Fort Cumberland. By November 1756, French Officer Lotbinière wrote about the difficulty of recapturing Fort Beausejour: "The English have deprived us of a great advantage by removing the French families that were settled there on their different plantations; thus we would have to make new settlements."

The Acadians and Mi'kmaq fought in the Annapolis region. They were victorious in the Battle of Bloody Creek (1757). Acadians being deported from Annapolis Royal on the ship Pembroke rebelled against the British crew, took over the ship and sailed to land. In December 1757, while cutting firewood near Fort Anne, John Weatherspoon was captured by Natives—presumably Miꞌkmaq— and was carried away to the mouth of the Miramichi River, from where he was sold or traded to the French, taken to Quebec and was held until late in 1759 and the Battle of the Plains of Abraham, when General Wolfe's forces prevailed.

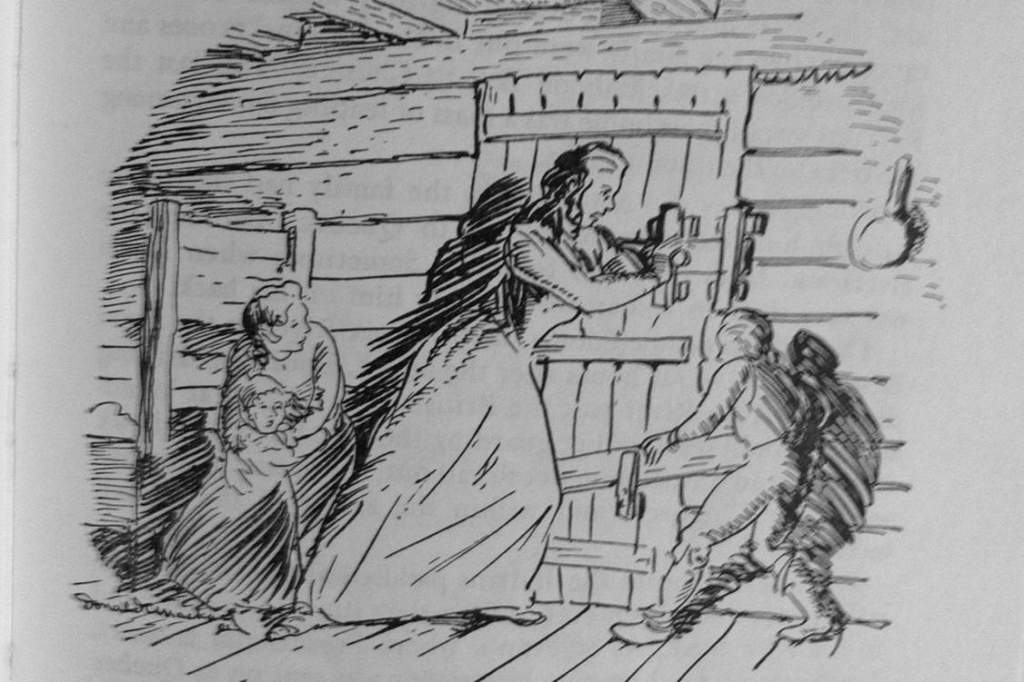
Raid on Lunenburg (1756)

Approximately 55 Acadians, who escaped the initial deportation at Annapolis Royal, are reported to have made their way to the Cape Sable region—which included south western Nova Scotia—from where they participated in numerous raids on Lunenburg, Nova Scotia. The Acadians and Miꞌkmaq raided the Lunenburg settlement nine times over a three-year period during the war. Boishebert ordered the first Raid on Lunenburg (1756). In 1757, the second raid on Lunenburg occurred, in which six people from the Brisson family were killed. The following year, March 1758, there was a raid on the Lunenburg Peninsula at the Northwest Range (present-day Blockhouse, Nova Scotia) when five people from the Ochs and Roder families were killed. By the end of May 1758, most of those on the Lunenburg Peninsula had abandoned their farms and retreated to the protection of the fortifications around the town of Lunenburg, losing the season for sowing their grain.

For those who did not leave their farms, the number of raids intensified. During the summer of 1758, there were four raids on the Lunenburg Peninsula. On July 13, 1758, one person on the LaHave River at Dayspring was killed and another seriously wounded by a member of the Labrador family. The next raid happened at Mahone Bay, Nova Scotia on August 24, 1758, when eight Miꞌkmaq attacked the family homes of Lay and Brant. They killed three people in the raid, but were unsuccessful in taking their scalps, a common practice for payment from the French. Two days later, two soldiers were killed in a raid on the blockhouse at LaHave, Nova Scotia. On September 11, a child was killed in a raid on the Northwest Range. Another raid happened on March 27, 1759, in which three members of the Oxner family were killed. The last raid happened on April 20, 1759, at Lunenburg, when the Miꞌkmaq killed four settlers who were members of the Trippeau and Crighton families.

=== Cape Sable ===
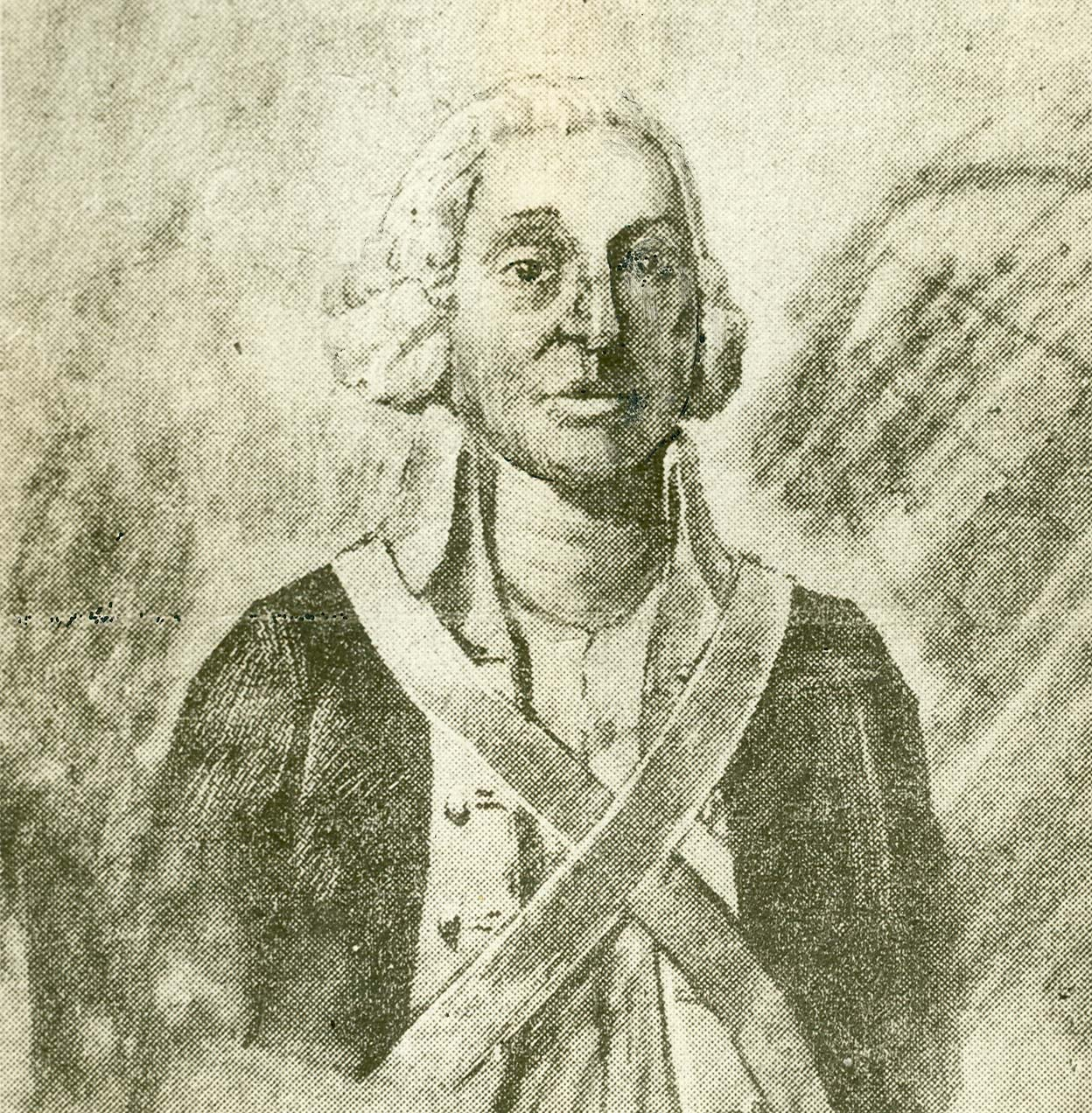
Major Jedidiah Preble

The Cape Sable campaign involved the British removing Acadians from present-day Shelburne County and Yarmouth County. In April 1756, Major Jedidiah Preble and his New England troops, on their return to Boston, raided a settlement near Port La Tour and captured 72 men, women and children. In the late summer of 1758, Major Henry Fletcher led the 35th regiment and a company of Gorham's Rangers to Cape Sable. He cordoned off the cape and sent his men through it. One hundred Acadians and Father Jean Baptistee de Gray surrendered, while about 130 Acadians and seven Miꞌkmaq escaped. The Acadian prisoners were taken to Georges Island in Halifax Harbour.

En route to the St. John River Campaign in September 1758, Monckton sent Major Roger Morris of the 35th Regiment, in command of two men-of-war and transport ships with 325 soldiers, to deport more Acadians. On October 28, Monckton's troops sent the women and children to Georges Island. The men were kept behind and forced to work with troops to destroy their village. On October 31, they were also sent to Halifax. In the spring of 1759, Joseph Gorham and his rangers arrived to take prisoner the remaining 151 Acadians. They reached Georges Island with them on June 29. November 1759 saw the deportation to Britain of 151 Acadians from Cape Sable who had been prisoners on George's Island since June. In July 1759 on Cape Sable, Captain Cobb arrived and was fired upon by 100 Acadians and Miꞌkmaq.

=== Île Saint-Jean and Île Royale ===
The second wave of the expulsion began with the French defeat at the Siege of Louisbourg (1758). Thousands of Acadians were deported from Île Saint-Jean (Prince Edward Island) and Île Royale (Cape Breton Island). The Île Saint-Jean Campaign resulted in the largest percentage of deaths of the deported Acadians. The sinking of the ships Violet (with about 280 persons aboard) and Duke William (with over 360 persons aboard) marked the highest numbers of fatalities during the expulsion. By the time the second wave of the expulsion had begun, the British had discarded their policy of relocating the Acadians to the Thirteen Colonies, and had begun deporting them directly to France. In 1758, hundreds of Île Royale Acadians fled to one of Boishebert's refugee camps south of Baie des Chaleurs.

=== Petitcodiac River Campaign ===
The Petitcodiac River Campaign was a series of British military operations that occurred from June to November 1758 to deport the Acadians who either lived along the river or had taken refuge there from earlier deportations. Benoni Danks and Gorham's Rangers carried out the operation. Contrary to Governor Lawrence's direction, New England Ranger Danks engaged in frontier warfare against the Acadians. On July 1, 1758, Danks began to pursue the Acadians on the Petiticodiac. They arrived at present-day Moncton and Danks' Rangers ambushed about 30 Acadians who were led by Joseph Broussard dit Beausoleil. The Acadians were driven into the river where three of them were killed and scalped, and the others were captured. Broussard was seriously wounded. Danks reported that the scalps were Miꞌkmaq and received payment for them. Thereafter, he went down in local lore as "one of the most reckless and brutal" of the Rangers.

=== St. John River Campaign ===
Colonel Robert Monckton led a force of 1,150 British soldiers to destroy the Acadian settlements along the banks of the Saint John River until they reached the largest village of Sainte-Anne des Pays-Bas (Fredericton, New Brunswick) in February 1759. (Note: Note that Faragher (2005), p. 405, indicates that Monckton had a force of 2000 men for this campaign.) Monckton was accompanied by New England Rangers led by Joseph Goreham, Captain Benoni Danks, Moses Hazen and George Scott. The British started at the bottom of the river, raiding Kennebecais and Managoueche (City of Saint John), where they built Fort Frederick. Then they moved up the river and raided Grimross (Arcadia, New Brunswick), Jemseg, and finally reached Sainte-Anne des Pays-Bas.

Contrary to Governor Lawrence's direction, New England Ranger Lieutenant Hazen engaged in frontier warfare against the Acadians in what has become known as the "Ste Anne's Massacre". On February 18, 1759, Hazen and about fifteen men arrived at Sainte-Anne des Pays-Bas. The Rangers pillaged and burned the village of 147 buildings, two Catholic churches and various barns and stables. The Rangers burned a large storehouse, containing a large quantity of hay, wheat, peas, oats, and other foodstuffs, and killed 212 horses, about five cows and a large number of pigs. They also burned the church located just west of Old Government House, Fredericton. The leader of the Acadian militia on the St. John river, Joseph Godin-Bellefontaine, refused to swear an oath despite the Rangers torturing and killing his daughter and three of his grandchildren in front of him. The Rangers also took six prisoners. (Note: A letter from Fort Frederick which was printed in Parker's New York Gazette or Weekly Post-Boy on April 2, 1759 provides additional details of the behaviour of the Rangers.)

=== Gulf of St. Lawrence Campaign ===
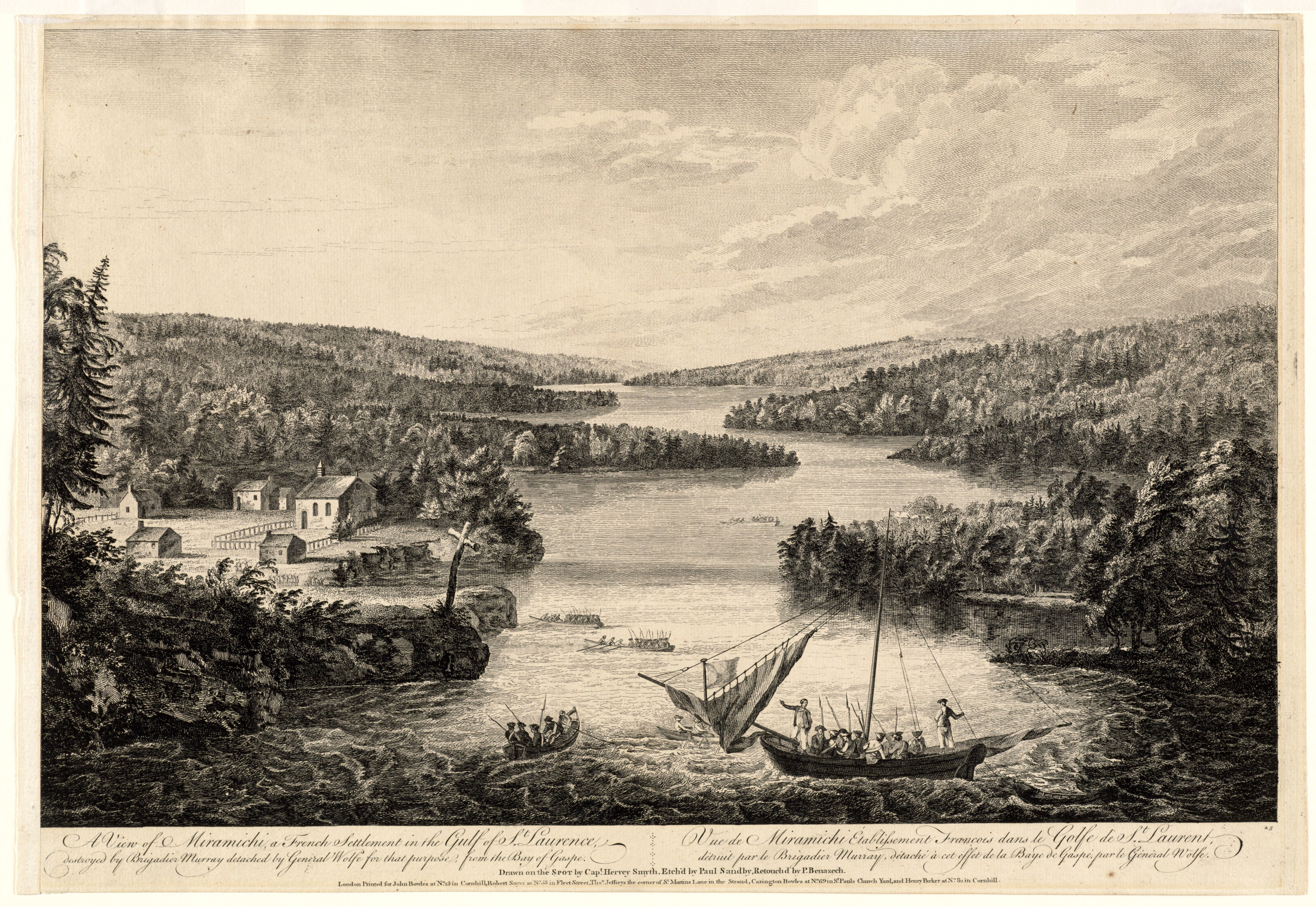
A view of Miramichi, a French settlement in the Gulf of St. Laurence, destroyed by Brigadier Murray detached by General Wolfe for that purpose, from the Bay of Gaspe, (1758)

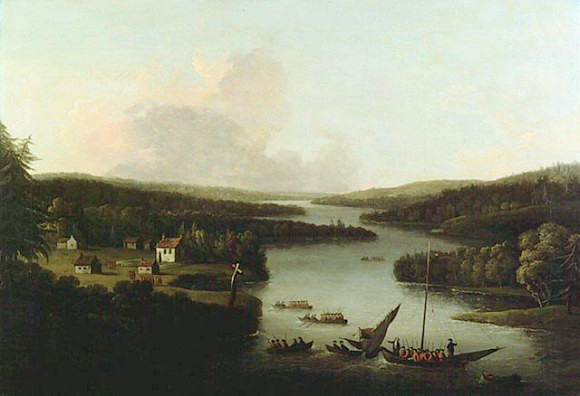
Raid on Miramichi Bay – Burnt Church Village by Captain Hervey Smythe (1758)

In the Gulf of St. Lawrence Campaign, also known as the Gaspee Expedition, British forces raided French villages along present-day New Brunswick and the Gaspé Peninsula coast of the Gulf of Saint Lawrence. Sir Charles Hardy and Brigadier-General James Wolfe commanded the naval and military forces, respectively. After the Siege of Louisbourg (1758), Wolfe and Hardy led a force of 1500 troops in nine vessels to Gaspé Bay, arriving there on September 5. From there they dispatched troops to Miramichi Bay on September 12, Grande-Rivière, Quebec and Pabos on September 13, and Mont-Louis, Quebec on September 14. Over the following weeks, Hardy took four sloops or schooners, destroyed about 200 fishing vessels, and took about 200 prisoners.

=== Restigouche ===
The Acadians took refuge along the Baie des Chaleurs and the Restigouche River. Boishébert had a refugee camp at Petit-Rochelle, which was probably located near present-day Pointe-à-la-Croix, Quebec. The year after the Battle of Restigouche, in late 1761, Captain Roderick Mackenzie and his force captured over 330 Acadians at Boishebert's camp.

=== Halifax ===
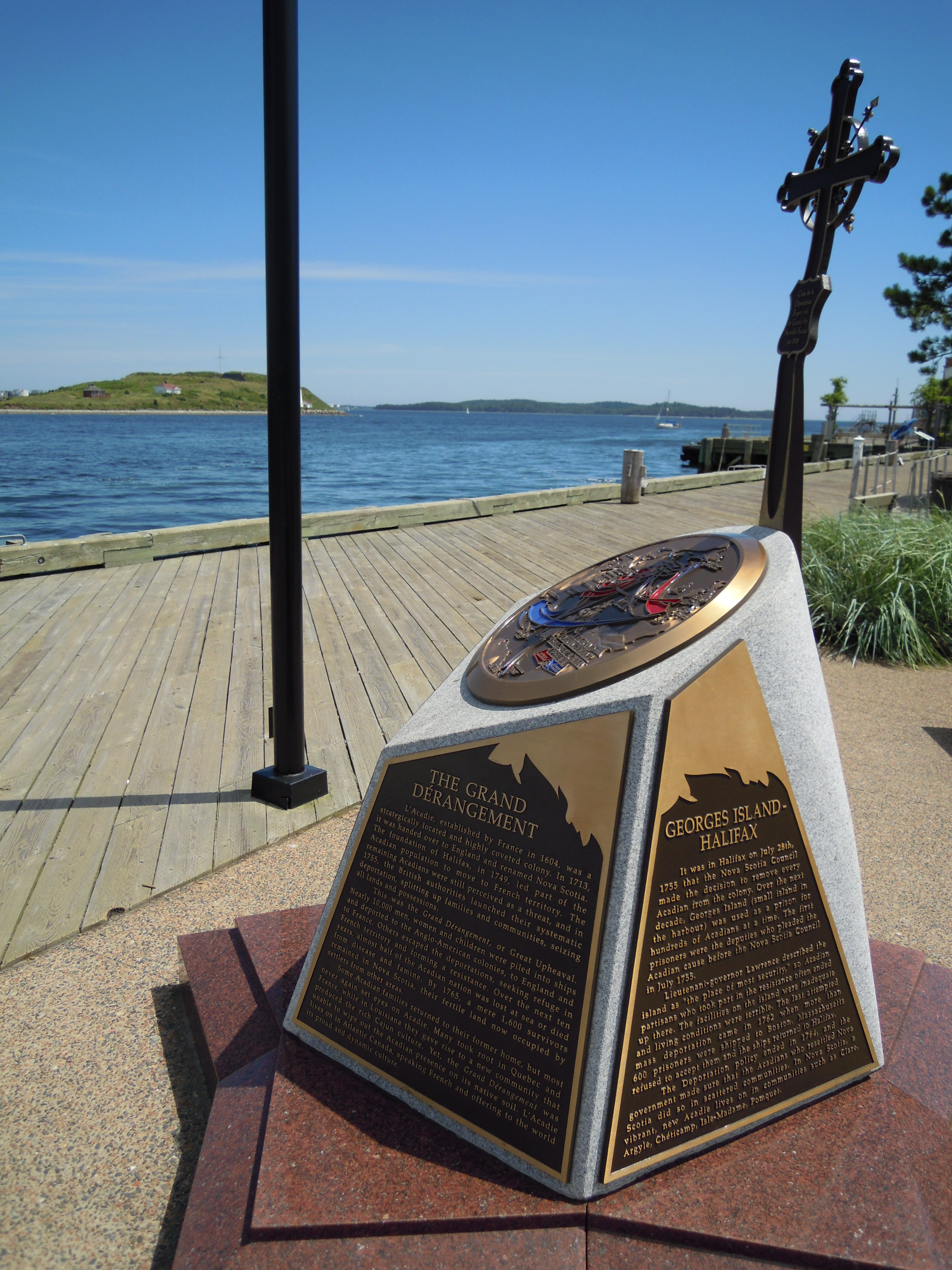
Monument to Imprisoned Acadians on Georges Island (background), Bishops Landing, Halifax

After the French conquered St. John's, Newfoundland on June 14, 1762, the success galvanized both the Acadians and the natives, who gathered in large numbers at various points throughout the province and behaved in a confident and, according to the British, "insolent fashion". Officials were especially alarmed when natives gathered close to the two principal towns in the province, Halifax and Lunenburg, where there were also large groups of Acadians. The government organized an expulsion of 1,300 people and shipped them to Boston. The government of Massachusetts refused the Acadians permission to land and sent them back to Halifax.

Miꞌkmaw and Acadian resistance was evident in the Halifax region. On April 2, 1756, Miꞌkmaq received payment from the Governor of Quebec for twelve British scalps taken at Halifax. Acadian Pierre Gautier, son of Joseph-Nicolas Gautier, led Miꞌkmaw warriors from Louisbourg on three raids against Halifax Peninsula in 1757. In each raid, Gautier took prisoners, scalps or both. Their last raid happened in September and Gautier went with four Miꞌkmaq, and killed and scalped two British men at the foot of Citadel Hill. Pierre went on to participate in the Battle of Restigouche.

Arriving on the provincial vessel King George, four companies of Rogers Rangers (500 rangers) were at Dartmouth April 8 until May 28 awaiting the Siege of Louisbourg (1758). While there they scoured the woods to stop raids on Dartmouth.

In July 1759, Miꞌkmaq and Acadians killed five British in Dartmouth, opposite McNabb's Island. By June 1757, the settlers had to be completely withdrawn from Lawrencetown (established 1754) because the number of Indian raids prevented settlers from leaving their houses. In nearby Dartmouth, in the spring of 1759, another Miꞌkmaw attack was launched on Fort Clarence, located at the present-day Dartmouth Refinery, in which five soldiers were killed. Before the deportation, the Acadian population was estimated at 14,000. Most were deported, but some Acadians escaped to Quebec, or hid among the Miꞌkmaq or in the countryside, to avoid deportation until the situation settled down.

=== Maine ===
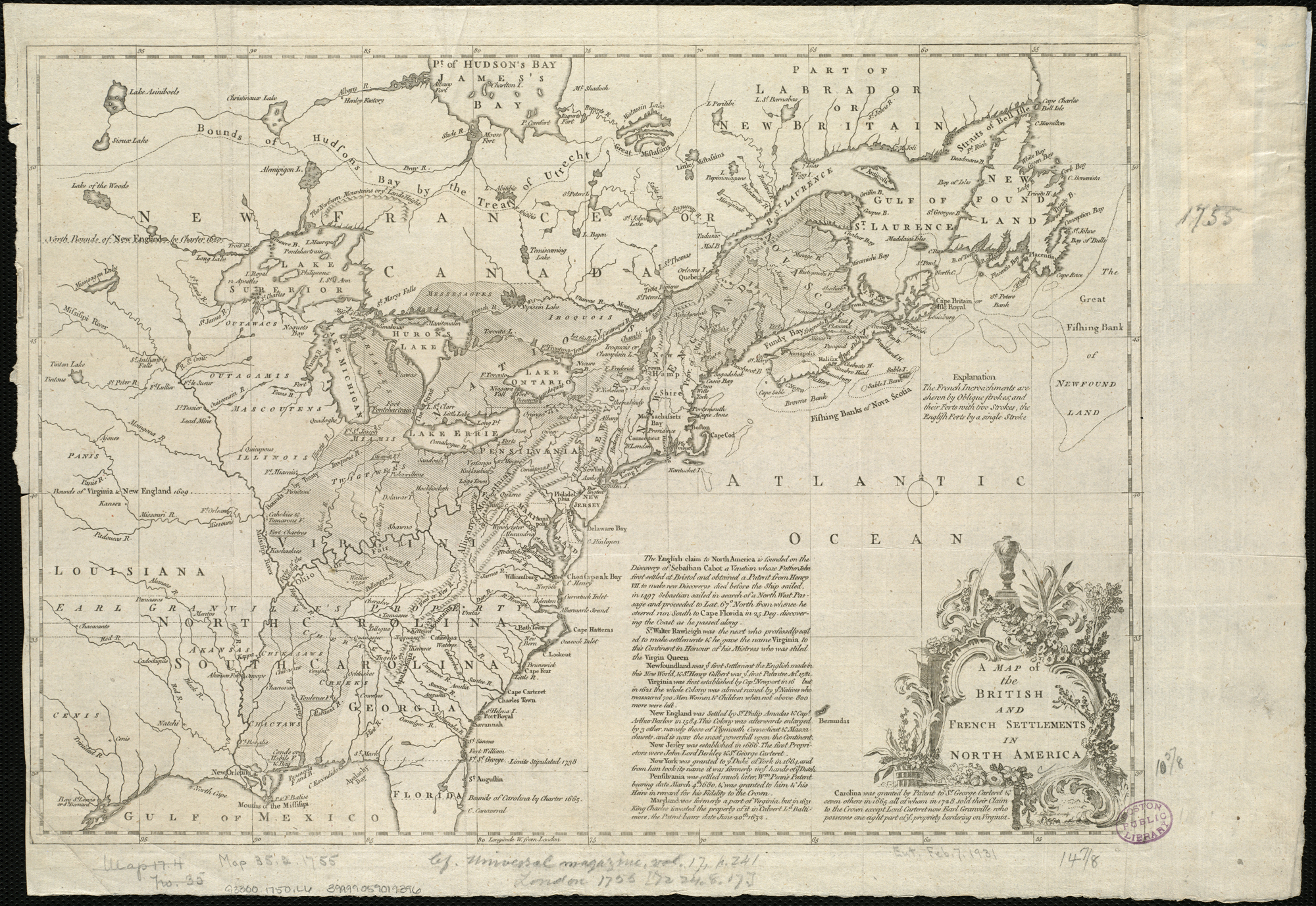
A map of the British and French settlements in North America in 1755. The province of Nova Scotia had expanded to encompass all of Acadie, or present-day New Brunswick.

In present-day Maine, the Miꞌkmaq and the Wolastoqiyik raided numerous New England villages. At the end of April 1755, they raided Gorham, killing two men and a family. Next they appeared in New Boston (Gray) and went through the neighbouring towns destroying the plantations. On May 13, they raided Frankfort (Dresden), where two men were killed and a house burned. The same day, they raided Sheepscot (Newcastle) and took five prisoners. Two people were killed in North Yarmouth on May 29 and one taken captive. The natives shot one person at Teconnet, now Waterville, took prisoners at Fort Halifax and two prisoners at Fort Shirley (Dresden). They also captured two workers at the fort at New Gloucester. During this period, the Wolastoqiyik and Miꞌkmaq were the only tribes of the Wabanaki Confederacy who were able to fight.

On August 13, 1758, Boishebert left Miramichi, New Brunswick with 400 soldiers, including Acadians whom he led from Port Toulouse. They marched to Fort St. George (Thomaston) and unsuccessfully laid siege to the town, and raided Munduncook (Friendship) where they wounded eight British settlers and killed others. This was Boishébert's last Acadian expedition; from there, he and the Acadians went to Quebec and fought in the Battle of Quebec (1759).

== Deportation destinations ==
Destinations for deported Acadians
Colony	Number of exiles
Massachusetts	2,000
Virginia	1,100
Maryland	1,000
Connecticut	700
Pennsylvania	500
North Carolina	500
South Carolina	500
Georgia	400
New York	250
Total	6,950
Britain	866
France	3,500
Total	11, 316 (Note: Total exiles for Britain and France found in Leblanc, Robert A. (April 1979). "Les migrations acadiennes". Cahiers de géographie du Québec. 23 (58): 99–124. doi:10.7202/021425ar.)

In the first wave of the expulsion, most Acadian exiles were assigned to rural communities in Massachusetts, Connecticut, New York, Pennsylvania, Maryland and South Carolina. In general, they refused to stay where they were put and large numbers migrated to the colonial port cities where they gathered in isolated, impoverished French-speaking Catholic neighbourhoods, the sort of communities Britain's colonial officials tried to discourage. More worryingly for the British authorities, some Acadians threatened to migrate north to French-controlled regions, including the Saint John River, Île Royale (Cape Breton Island), the coasts of the Gulf of St. Lawrence and Canada. Because the British believed their policy of sending the Acadians to the Thirteen Colonies had failed, they deported the Acadians to France during the second wave of the expulsion.

=== Maryland ===
Approximately 1,000 Acadians went to the Colony of Maryland, where they lived in a section of Baltimore that became known as French Town. The Irish Catholics were reported to have shown charity to the Acadians by taking orphaned children into their homes.

=== Massachusetts ===
Approximately 2,000 Acadians disembarked at the Colony of Massachusetts. There were several families deported to the Province of Maine, a large, but sparsely populated exclave of the colony of Massachusetts. For four long winter months, William Shirley, who had ordered their deportation, had not allowed them to disembark and as a result, half died of cold and starvation aboard the ships. Some men and women were forced into servitude or forced labor, children were taken away from their parents and were distributed to various families throughout Massachusetts. The government also arranged the adoption of orphaned children and provided subsidies for housing and food for a year.

=== Connecticut ===
The Colony of Connecticut prepared for the arrival of 700 Acadians. Like Maryland, the Connecticut legislature declared that "[the Acadians] be made welcome, helped and settled under the most advantageous conditions, or if they have to be sent away, measures be taken for their transfer."

=== Pennsylvania and Virginia ===
The Colony of Pennsylvania accommodated 500 Acadians. Because they arrived unexpectedly, the Acadians had to remain in port on their vessels for months. The Colony of Virginia refused to accept the Acadians on grounds that no notice was given of their arrival. They were detained at Williamsburg, where hundreds died from disease and malnutrition. They were then sent to Britain where they were held as prisoners until the Treaty of Paris in 1763.

=== Carolinas and Georgia ===
The Acadians who had offered the most resistance to the British—particularly those who had been at Chignecto—were reported to have been sent to the Southern Colonies (the Carolinas and the Colony of Georgia), where about 1,400 Acadians settled and were "subsidized" and put to work on plantations.

Under the leadership of Jacques Maurice Vigneau of Baie Verte, the majority of the Acadians in Georgia received a passport from the governor, John Reynolds. These passports gave the Acadians the legal right to leave Georgia and enter other colonies. South Carolina followed Georgia's example and expediated passports to Acadian exiles in hopes they would move on to other territories. Along with these papers, South Carolina authorities provided the Acadians with two vessels. After running aground numerous times in the ships, some of these Acadians returned to the Bay of Fundy. Along the way, they were captured and imprisoned. Only 900 managed to return to Acadia, less than half of those who had begun the voyage. Others also tried to return home. The South Carolina Gazette reported that in February, about 30 Acadians fled the island to which they were confined and escaped their pursuers. Alexandre Broussard, brother of the famed resistance leader Joseph Broussard, dit Beausoleil, was among them. About a dozen are recorded to have returned to Acadia after an overland journey of 1,400 leagues (4,200 miles; 6,800 km).

=== France and Britain ===
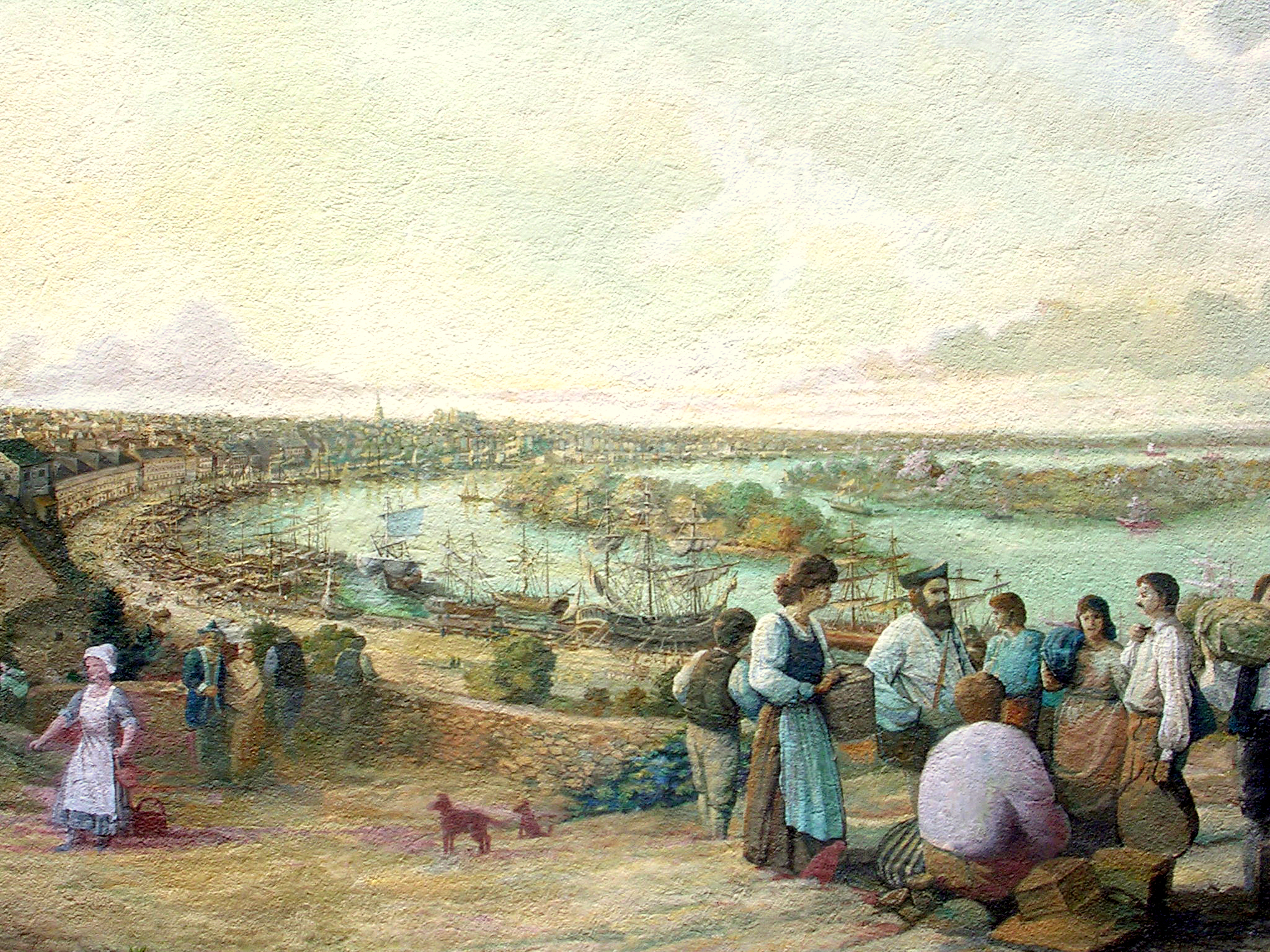
Mémorial des Acadiens de Nantes

After the siege of Louisbourg, the British began to deport the Acadians directly to France rather than to the British colonies. Some Acadians deported to France never reached their destination. Almost 1,000 died when the transport ships Duke William, Violet, and Ruby sank in 1758 en route from Île Saint-Jean (Prince Edward Island) to France. About 3,000 Acadian refugees eventually gathered in France's port cities and went to Nantes.

Many Acadians who were sent to Britain were housed in crowded warehouses and subject to plagues due to the close conditions, while others were allowed to join communities and live normal lives. In France, 78 Acadian families were repatriated to Belle-Île-en-Mer off the western coast of Brittany after the Treaty of Paris. The most serious resettlement attempt was made by Louis XV, who offered 2 acres (8,100 m^{2}) of land in the Poitou province to 626 Acadian families each, where they lived close together in a region they called La Grande Ligne ("The Great Road", also known as "the King's Highway"). About 1,500 Acadians accepted the offer, but the land turned out to be infertile, and by the end of 1775, most of them abandoned the province.

== Fate of the Acadians ==
=== Louisiana ===
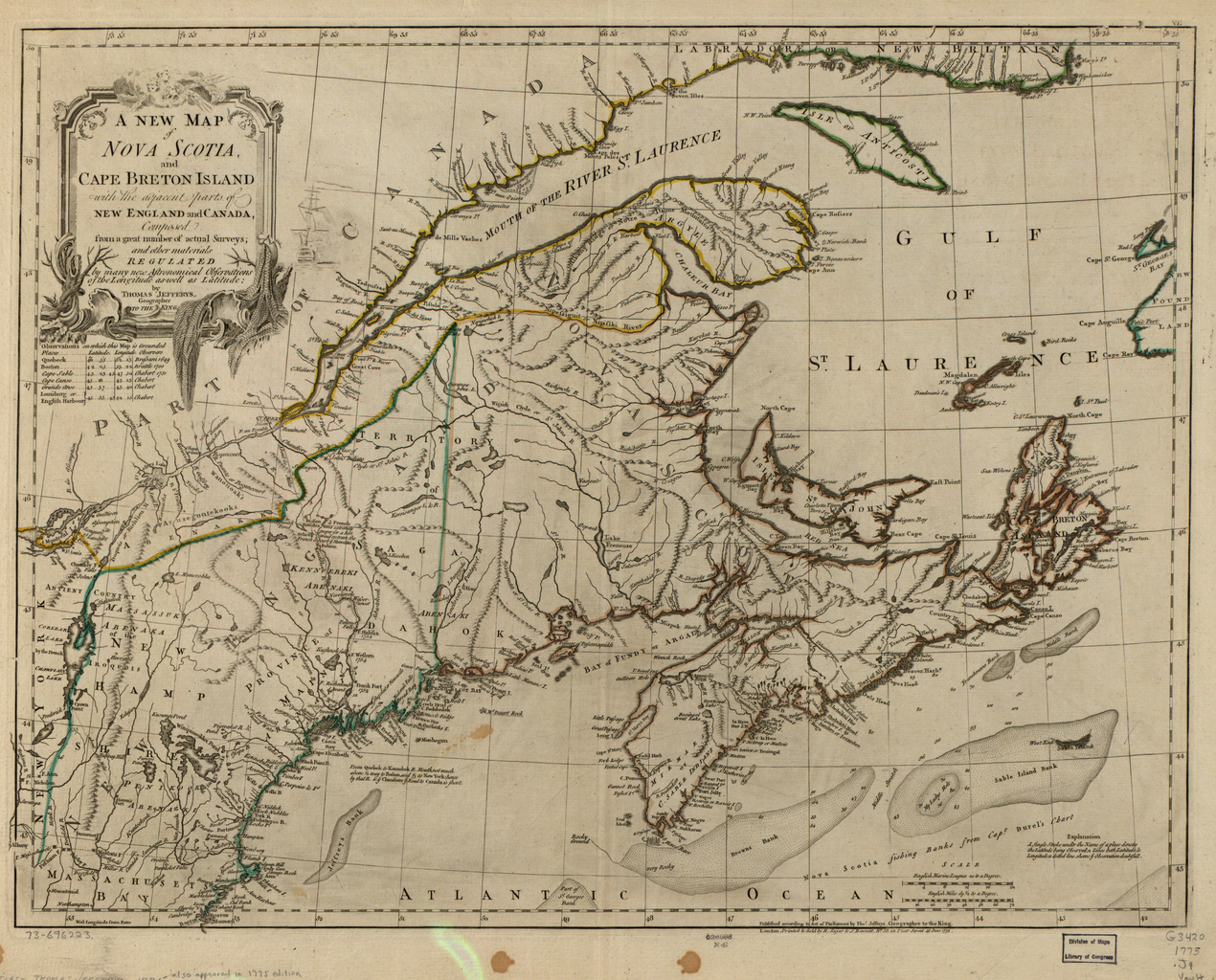
Thomas Jefferys (1710–71) was a royal geographer to King George III and a London publisher of maps. He is well known for his maps of North America, produced to meet commercial demand, but also to support British territorial claims against the French. This map presents Nova Scotia and Cape Breton Island in the wake of the "great upheaval".

The British did not directly deport Acadians to Louisiana. Following the expulsion by the British from their home, Acadians found their way to many friendly locales, including France. Acadians left France, under the influence of Henri Peyroux de la Coudreniere, to settle in Louisiana, which was then a colony of Spain.

Louisiana was transferred to the Spanish government in 1762. Because of the good relations which existed between France and Spain, and because of their common Catholic religion, some Acadians took oaths of allegiance to the Spanish government. Soon the Acadians composed the largest ethnic group in Louisiana. First, they settled in areas along the Mississippi River and later, they settled in the Atchafalaya Basin, as well as in the prairie lands to the west—a region which was later renamed Acadiana.

Some Acadians were sent to colonize places in the Caribbean, such as French Guiana, or the Falkland Islands under the direction of Louis Antoine de Bougainville; these latter efforts at colonization were unsuccessful. Other Acadians migrated to places like Saint-Domingue, but they fled to New Orleans after the Haitian Revolution. Louisiana's population contributed to the founding of the modern Cajun population. (The French word "Acadien" evolved into the word "Cadien", which was later anglicized as the word "Cajun").

=== Nova Scotia ===
On July 11, 1764, the British government passed an order-in-council to permit Acadians to legally return to British territories in small isolated groups, provided that they take an unqualified oath of allegiance. Some Acadians returned to Nova Scotia (which included present-day New Brunswick). Under the deportation orders, Acadian land tenure had been forfeited to the British crown and the returning Acadians no longer owned land. Beginning in 1760 much of their former land was distributed under grant to the New England Planters. The lack of available farmland compelled many Acadians to seek out a new livelihood as fishermen on the west coast of Nova Scotia, known as the French Shore. The British authorities scattered other Acadians in groups along the shores of eastern New-Brunswick and the Gulf of Saint Lawrence. It was not until the 1930s, with the advent of the Acadian co-operative movements, that the Acadians became less economically disadvantaged.

== Historical analysis ==
According to historian John Mack Faragher, the religious and ethnic dimensions of the Expulsion of Acadians are in addition to, and deeply connected with, the military exigencies cited as causes for the Removals. There is significant evidence in the correspondence of military and civil leaders for anti-Catholicism. Faragher writes, "The first session of the Nova Scotia Assembly ... passed a series of laws intended to institutionalize Acadian dispossession" including an act titled "An Act for the Quieting of Possessions to Protestant Grantees of land formerly occupied by the French." In it and two subsequent acts, the Church of England was made the official religion. These acts granted certain political rights to Protestants while the new laws excluded Catholics from public office and the franchise (the right to vote) and forbade Catholics from owning land in the province. It also empowered British authorities to seize all "popish" property (Church lands) for the crown and barred Catholic clergy from entering or residing in the province, as they wanted no repeat of Le Loutre and his type of war. In addition to other anti-Catholic measures, Faragher concludes "These laws—passed by a popular assembly, not enacted by military fiat—laid the foundation for the migration of Protestant settlers."

In the 1740s, William Shirley had hoped to assimilate Acadians into the Protestant fold. He did so by trying to encourage (or force) Acadian women to marry English Protestants and statutes were passed which required the offspring of such unions to be sent to English schools and raised as "English Protestants" (quote from a letter by Shirley). This was linked to larger anxieties in the realm over the loyalty of Catholics in general—as Charles Stuart's Jacobite Rebellion was a Catholic-led rebellion as was Le Loutre's rebellion in Nova Scotia. Shirley, who in part was responsible for the Removals, according to historian Geoffrey Plank, "recommended using military force to expel the most 'obnoxious' Acadians and replace them with Protestant immigrants. In time the Protestants would come to dominate their new communities." Shirley wanted "peaceable [loyal] subjects" and specifically, in his own words, "good Protestant ones."

Faragher compared the expulsion of the Acadians to contemporary acts of ethnic cleansing. In contrast, some leading historians have objected to this characterization of the expulsion. Historian John Grenier asserts that Faragher overstates the religious motivation for the expulsion and obscures the fact that the British accommodated Acadians by providing Catholic priests for forty years prior to the Expulsion. Grenier writes that Faragher "overstates his case; his focus on the grand dérangement as an early example of ethnic cleansing carries too much present-day emotional weight and in turn overshadows much of the accommodation that Acadians and Anglo-Americans reached." As well, the British were clearly not concerned that the Acadians were French, given the fact that they were recruiting French "foreign Protestants" to settle in the region. Further, the New Englanders of Boston were not banishing Acadians from the Atlantic region; instead, they were actually deporting them to live in the heart of New England: Boston and elsewhere in the British colonies.

While there was clear animosity between Catholics and Protestants during this time period, many historians point to the overwhelming evidence which suggests that the motivation for the expulsion was military. The British wanted to cut off supply lines to the Miꞌkmaq, Louisbourg and Quebec. They also wanted to end any military threat which the Acadians posed (See Military history of the Acadians). A. J. B. Johnston wrote that the evidence for the removal of the Acadians indicates that the decision makers thought the Acadians were a military threat, therefore the deportation of 1755 does not qualify as an act of ethnic cleansing. Geoffrey Plank argues that the British continued the expulsion after 1758 for military reasons: present-day New Brunswick remained contested territory and the New Englanders wanted to make sure that British negotiators would be unlikely to return the region to the French as they had done after King George's War.

Other historians have observed that it was not uncommon for empires to move their subjects and populations during this time period. For Naomi E. S. Griffiths and A.J.B. Johnston, the event is comparable to other deportations in history, and it should not be considered an act of ethnic cleansing. In From Migrant to Acadian, Griffiths writes that "the Acadian deportation, as a government action, was a pattern with other contemporary happenings." The Expulsion of the Acadians has been compared to similar military operations during the eighteenth and nineteenth centuries. The French carried out expulsions in Newfoundland in 1697 when they occupied the British portion of Newfoundland during Pierre d'Iberville's Avalon Peninsula Campaign, burning every British settlement and exiling over 500 inhabitants. A.J.B. Johnston notes that in 1767, French authorities forcibly removed nearly 800 Acadian and French inhabitants from Saint-Pierre and Miquelon, transporting them against their will to France and compares the expulsions to the fate of the United Empire Loyalists, who were expelled from the United States to present-day Canada after the American Revolution. Another deportation was the Highland Clearances in Scotland between 1762 and 1886. Another North American expulsion was the Indian Removal of the 1830s, in which the Cherokee and other Native Americans from the South-East United States were removed from their traditional homelands.

Further, other historians have noted that civilian populations are often devastated during wartime. For example, five wars were fought along the New England and Acadia border during the 70 years prior to the expulsion (See French and Indian Wars, Father Rale's War and Father Le Loutre's War). During these wars, the French and Wabanaki Confederacy conducted numerous military campaigns in which they killed and captured British civilians. (See the Northeast Coast Campaigns 1688, 1703, 1723, 1724, 1745, 1746, 1747, 1750.)

Acadian historian Maurice Basque writes that the term "'genocide' ... does not apply at all to the Grand Derangement. Acadie was not Armenia, and to compare Grand-Pré with Auschwitz and the killing fields of Cambodia is a complete and utter trivialization of the many genocidal horrors of contemporary history." Concerning the use of 20th century terms such as "ethnic cleansing" and "genocide" to understand the past, historian John G. Reid states, "I'm not sure that it's the best way to understand 18th century realities... What happened in the 18th century is a process of imperial expansion that was ruthless at times, that cost lives.... But to my mind, you can't just transfer concepts between centuries."

== Commemorations ==
In 1847, the American poet Henry Wadsworth Longfellow published a long, narrative poem about the expulsion of the Acadians titled Evangeline, in which he depicts the plight of the fictional character Evangeline. The poem became popular and made the expulsion well known. The Evangeline Oak is a tourist attraction in Louisiana. According to Acadian historian Maurice Basque, the story of Evangeline continues to influence historic accounts of the deportation, emphasising neutral Acadians and de-emphasising those who resisted British America.

The song "Acadian Driftwood", recorded in 1975 by The Band, portrays the Great Upheaval and the displacement of the Acadian people.

Antonine Maillet wrote a novel, called Pélagie-la-Charrette, about the aftermath of the Great Upheaval. It was awarded the Prix Goncourt in 1979.

Grand-Pré Park is a National Historic Site of Canada situated in Grand-Pré, Nova Scotia, and preserved as a living monument to the expulsion. It contains a memorial church and a statue of Evangeline, the subject of Longfellow's poem.

The song "Lila" by The Brothers Creeggan was written to commemorate the expulsion of the Acadians, and was specifically inspired by the Evangeline statue in Grand-Pré. The song was included on their 2000 album Trunks.

In 2018, Canadian historian and novelist A. J. B. Johnston published a YA novel entitled The Hat, inspired by what happened at Grand-Pré in 1755.

The song "1755" was composed by American Cajun fiddler and singer Dewey Balfa and performed on his 1987 album Souvenirs, and later covered by Steve Riley and the Mamou Playboys on their 1994 live album.

In December 2003, Governor General Adrienne Clarkson, representing Queen Elizabeth II (Canada's head of state), acknowledged the expulsion but did not apologize for it. She designated July 28 as "A Day of Commemoration of the Great Upheaval". This proclamation, officially the Royal Proclamation of 2003, closed one of the longest cases in the history of the British courts, initiated in 1760 when the Acadian representatives first presented their grievances of forced dispossession of land, property and livestock. December 13, the date on which the Duke William sank, is commemorated as Acadian Remembrance Day.

There is a museum dedicated to Acadian history and culture, with a detailed reconstruction of the Great Uprising, in Bonaventure, Quebec.

== See also ==
- Acadian architecture
- Acadian cinema
- Persecution of Roman Catholics
- English Invasion of Acadia (1654)
- France in the Seven Years' War
- Grand-Pré National Historic Site
- Great Britain in the Seven Years' War
- Indian removal
- List of ethnic cleansing campaigns
- Michel Bastarache dit Basque
- Military history of Nova Scotia
- Sainte-Anne du Ruisseau Church
- Société Nationale de l'Acadie

== General references ==
English

- Akins, Thomas Beamish (1869a). "Papers Relating to the Acadian French 1714–1755". Selections from the Public Documents of the Province of Nova Scotia: Pub. Under a Resolution of the House of Assembly Passed March 15, 1865. Halifax: Charles Annand. Archived from the original on April 3, 2023. and online at Nova Scotia Archives Archived December 10, 2018, at the Wayback Machine
- Akins, Thomas Beamish (1869b). "Papers Related to the Forcible Removal of the Acadian French from Nova Scotia 1755–1768". Selections from the Public Documents of the Province of Nova Scotia: Pub. Under a Resolution of the House of Assembly Passed March 15, 1865. Halifax: Charles Annand. Archived from the original on April 3, 2023. and online at Nova Scotia Archives Archived December 19, 2018, at the Wayback Machine
- Bell, Winthrop (1961). The Foreign Protestants and the Settlement of Nova Scotia: The History of a Piece of Arrested British Colonial Policy in the Eighteenth Century. University of Toronto Press. OCLC 6132479.
- Belliveau, Pierre (1972). French Neutrals in Massachusetts: The Story of Acadians Rounded Up by Soldiers from Massachusetts and Their Captivity in the Bay Province, 1755–1766. Boston: K. S. Giffen. Archived from the original on April 3, 2023.
- Carroll, Brian D. (September 2012). "'Savages' in the Service of Empire: Native American Soldiers in Gorham's Rangers, 1744–1762". The New England Quarterly. 85 (3): 383–429. doi:10.1162/TNEQ_a_00207. S2CID 57559449. Archived from the original on July 16, 2021.
- Doughty, Arthur G. (1916). The Acadian Exiles: A Chronicle of the Land of Evangeline. Toronto: Glasgow, Brook & Company.
- Dunn, Brenda (2004). A History of Port-Royal-Annapolis Royal, 1605–1800. Nimbus. ISBN 978-1-55109-740-4. Archived from the original on April 3, 2023.
- Dunn, William; West, Linda (2011). "The Expulsion of the Acadians". Canada: A Country by Consent. Artistic Productions. Archived from the original on December 7, 2018.
- Faragher, John Mack (2005). A Great and Noble Scheme: The Tragic Story of the Expulsion of the French Acadians from Their American Homeland. W.W Norton & Company. ISBN 978-0-393-05135-3. Archived from the original on April 3, 2023.
- Grenier, John (2008). The Far Reaches of Empire: War in Nova Scotia 1710–1760. University of Oklahoma Press. ISBN 978-0-8061-3876-3. Archived from the original on April 3, 2023.
- Griffiths, N.E.S. (1969). The Acadian Deportation: Deliberate Perfidy Or Cruel Necessity?. Copp Clark. ISBN 9780773031005. Archived from the original on April 3, 2023.
- Griffiths, N.E.S. (2005). From Migrant to Acadian: A North American Border People, 1604–1755. McGill-Queen's University Press. ISBN 978-0-7735-2699-0. Archived from the original on April 3, 2023.
- Hodson, Christopher (2012). The Acadian Diaspora: An Eighteenth-Century History. Oxford University Press. ISBN 978-0-19-973977-6. Archived from the original on April 3, 2023.
- Jobb, Dean W. (2005). The Acadians: A People's Story of Exile and Triumph. Wiley. ISBN 978-0-470-15772-5. Archived from the original on April 3, 2023.
- Johnston, John (2005). "French attitudes toward the Acadians". In Ronnie Gilles LeBlanc (ed.). Du Grand Dérangement à la Déportation: nouvelles perspectives historiques. Université de Moncton. ISBN 978-1-897214-02-2. Archived from the original on April 3, 2023.
- Johnston, A.J.B. (2007). "The Acadian Deportation in a Comparative Context: An Introduction". Journal of the Royal Nova Scotia Historical Society. 10: 114–131.
- Lockerby, Earle (2008). Deportation of the Prince Edward Island Acadians. Nimbus. ISBN 978-1-55109-650-6. Archived from the original on April 3, 2023.
- March, James H. (July 15, 2015) [September 4, 2013]. "The Deportation of the Acadians". The Canadian Encyclopedia (online ed.). Historica Canada. Archived from the original on August 9, 2019.
- McLennan, J.S. (1918). Louisbourg: From its Founding to its Fall. London: Macmillan and Co.
- Moody, Barry (1981). The Acadians. Grolier. ISBN 978-0-7172-1810-3. Archived from the original on April 3, 2023.
- Neering, Rosemary; Garrod, Stan (1976). Life in Acadia. Fitzhenry and Whiteside. ISBN 978-0-88902-180-8. Archived from the original on April 3, 2023.
- Patterson, Stephen E. (1994). "1744–1763: Colonial Wars and Aboriginal Peoples". In Phillip Buckner; John G. Reid (eds.). The Atlantic Region to Confederation: A History. University of Toronto Press. pp. 125–155. ISBN 978-1-4875-1676-5. JSTOR 10.3138/j.ctt15jjfrm. Archived from the original on April 3, 2023.
- Plank, Geoffrey (2001). An Unsettled Conquest: The British Campaign Against the Peoples of Acadia. University of Pennsylvania Press. ISBN 978-0-8122-0710-1. Archived from the original on April 3, 2023.
- Reid, John G.; Basque, Maurice; Mancke, Elizabeth; et al. (2004). The "Conquest" of Acadia, 1710: Imperial, Colonial, and Aboriginal Constructions. University of Toronto Press. doi:10.3138/9781442680883. ISBN 978-0-8020-8538-2. JSTOR 10.3138/9781442680883. Archived from the original on April 3, 2023.
- Rieder, Milton P.; Rieder, Norma Gaudet (1977). The Acadian Exiles in the American Colonies, 1755–1768. Rieder. Archived from the original on April 3, 2023.
- Williamson, William D. (1832). The History of the State of Maine: From Its First Discovery, 1602, to the Separation, A.D. 1820, Inclusive. Glazier, Masters & Co.
- Text of Charles Lawrence's orders to Captain John Handfield – Halifax August 11, 1755
- "Journal of Colonel John Winslow: Of the Provincial Troops, While Engaged in the Siege of Fort Beauséjour in the Summer and Autumn of 1755". Collections of the Nova Scotia Historical Society. Vol. IV. Halifax: Nova Scotia Historical Society. 1885. pp. 113–246. and online at Nova Scotia Archives Archived December 10, 2018, at the Wayback Machine
- "Journal of Colonel John Winslow of the Provisional Troops, While Engaged Removing the Acadian French Inhabitants from Grand Pre, and Neighbouring Settlements, in Autumn of the Year 1755". Collections of the Nova Scotia Historical Society. Vol. III. Halifax: Nova Scotia Historical Society. 1883. pp. 71–196. and online at Nova Scotia Archives Archived December 10, 2018, at the Wayback Machine

French

- Gilles LeBlanc, Ronnie, ed. (2005). Du Grand Dérangement à la Déportation: nouvelles perspectives historiques. Université de Moncton. ISBN 978-1-897214-02-2. Archived from the original on April 3, 2023.
- Arsenault, Bona (2004). Histoire des Acadiens. Fides. ISBN 978-2-7621-2613-6. Archived from the original on April 3, 2023.
- Sauvageau, Robert (1987). Acadie : La guerre de Cent Ans des français d'Amérique aux Maritimes et en Louisiane 1670–1769. Paris: Berger-Levrault.
- Gaudet, Placide (1922). Le Grand Dérangement : sur qui retombe la responsabilité de l'expulsion des Acadiens, Ottawa: Impr. de l'Ottawa Printing Co.
- d'Arles, Henri (1918). La déportation des Acadiens, Québec: Imprimerie de l'Action sociale
