= Joseph Leblanc dit Le Maigre =

Acadian Patriot and fugitive. (1697-1772)

Joseph Leblanc dit Le Maigre (March 12, 1697 – October 19, 1772) was an Acadian farmer, trader and prominent patriot who took part in several attempts by the French to recover their holdings in what is now Nova Scotia. Leblanc was an important figure in the Acadian resistance to British rule and deportations.

The son of Antoine Leblanc and Marie Bourgeois, he was born in Les Mines (near Wolfville, Nova Scotia) in Acadia. He was the grandson of Daniel Leblanc, an early settler and administrator of Port-Royal. Joseph’s maternal Grandfather, Jacques Bourgeois, was a merchant, military leader and surgeon for Charles d'Aulnay, he also administered trade in the Bay of Fundy. In 1719, Leblanc married Anne, the daughter of Alexandre Bourg who was a judge, notary and King's attorney in Port-Royal. He owned a farm and raised cattle on a large scale near Grand-Pré.

== Biography ==
Leblanc took part in siege of Annapolis Royal led by François Dupont Duvivier in 1744. Although the British interrogated him about his part in the affair, he was able to plead ignorance. However, after he assisted Paul Marin de la Malgue in a new attack in the summer of 1745, Leblanc was imprisoned at Annapolis Royal. Leblanc escaped and provided provisions to a large French fleet led by the Duke of Anville, who intended to recapture Acadia and Île-Royale. After the failure of this expedition, Leblanc was captured and sent to Boston. He escaped but was forced to flee again after the British authorities discovered his presence. After Île-Royale was returned to France at the end of the War of the Austrian Succession, Leblanc settled at Port-Toulouse.

After Louisbourg fell in 1758, for a time Leblanc operated as a pirate in the Gulf of Saint Lawrence. The British confiscated his possessions and imprisoned him at Halifax. After his release, Leblanc went to Miquelon. His wife died in July 1766 and, soon afterwards, he moved to the island of Belle Île in France, where he lived in the village of Kervaux. Leblanc died there at the age of 75.

His daughter, Marguerite married Acadian merchant and privateer, Joseph Dugas. Another daughter, Anne married Miquelon Militia officer, Joseph Nicolas Gautier.
