= Joseph Dugas =

Joseph Dugas may refer to:

- Joseph Dugas (merchant) (1714–1779), merchant, privateer and militia officer of Acadian descent
- Joseph Louis Euclide Dugas (1861–1943), farmer and political figure in Quebec
