= Jeanne Dugas =

Historic Acadian person

Jeanne Dugas (October 16, 1731 – October 1817) was an Acadian woman whose life exemplified the history of the Acadian people in the Canadian Maritimes.

== Early life ==
The daughter of Joseph Dugas, a ship builder and navigator, and Marguerite Richard, she was born in Louisbourg. During the smallpox epidemic of 1732 to 1733, she lost three sisters and her father. Her mother, who took over the management of her husband's affairs, married Philippe-Charles de Saint-Étienne de La Tour in 1736. Around 1738, the family moved to Grand-Pré. Dugas' mother died in 1746.

== Background ==
At the end of the War of the Austrian Succession, Île-Royale (later Cape Breton Island), was returned to France.

The Grand Dérangement, also known in English as the Expulsion of the Acadians, was the forced removal of Acadian inhabitants from their lands by British authorities in the mid-18th century. It began in 1755, during rising tensions between Britain and France in North America, after Acadians refused to swear unconditional oaths of allegiance to the British Crown.

In July 1755, Lieutenant Governor Charles Lawrence and the Nova Scotia Council authorized the deportation of Acadians, and the first orders were issued in August of that year, marking the official start of the Grand Dérangement.

== Adult life ==
At the time the expulsion began, Jeanne Dugas and her family lived safely within French territory, on Île-Royale. However, in 1758, Louisbourg fell to the British and the Acadians of Île-Royale were also at risk.

Dugas and her family fled to avoid capture and found refuge with other Acadians along the Gulf of St. Lawrence. The couple had moved to Restigouche in Acadia by 1760; in 1761, they were in Népisiguit.

Later that year, they were taken prisoner by the British following a raid on refugee camps and brought to Fort Cumberland.

The prisoners were released at the end of the Seven Years' War and, in 1771, Dugas and her family were living at Arichat.

By 1784, the couple had moved to Cascapédia near the current town of New Richmond.

Soon afterwards, they became one of the founding families of Chéticamp, Nova Scotia.

Dugas was the village midwife; in that role, she probably also looked after the sick of the village.

== Later life ==
By 1809, her husband had died. When Bishop Joseph-Octave Plessis visited Chéticamp in 1812, Dugas told him of how she had been forced to relocate fifteen times over her life. She was buried at Chéticamp on October 16, 1817 at the age of 86.

Her brother Joseph was a merchant and privateer who remained loyal to France.

== Recognition ==
In 2013, Cassie Deveaux Cohoon published the biographical novel Jeanne Dugas of Acadia. A play was also written based on her life.

In 2014, Jeanne Dugas was named a Person of National Historic Significance by the Canadian government.
