= Cassie Deveaux Cohoon =

Canadian writer (1935–2019)

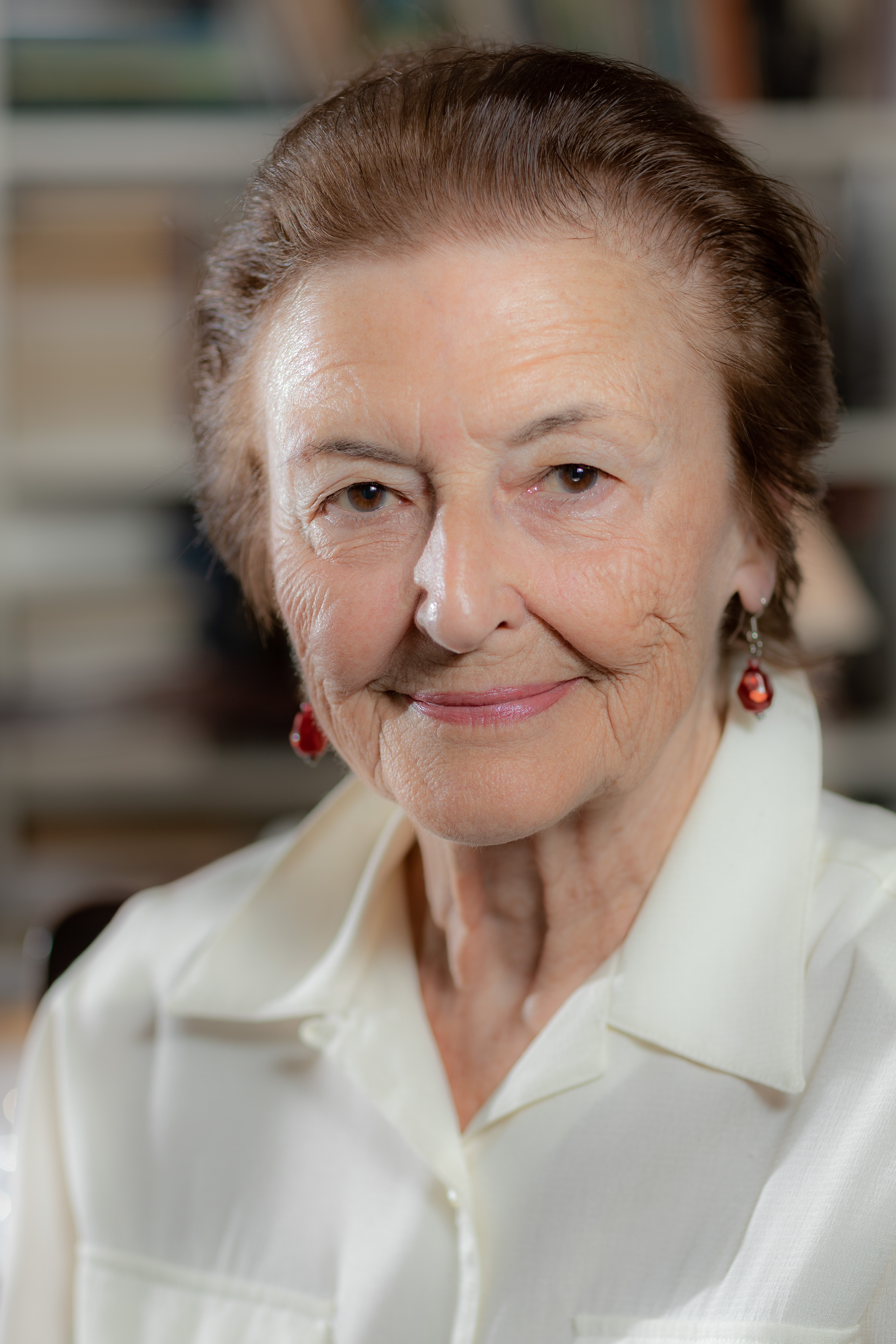
- Deveaux Cohoon in 2019
- Born: Marie-Casilda Deveau; February 2, 1935; Chéticamp, Nova Scotia, Canada
- Died: September 3, 2019; Montreal, Quebec, Canada
- Spouse: Douglas Haig Cohoon (m. 1972; died 1994)
- Writing career
- Period: 2007-2019
- Genre: Historical fiction
- Notable work: Jeanne Dugas of Acadia

Cassie Deveaux Cohoon (2 February 1935 – 3 September 2019) was a Canadian writer of Acadian descent. The primary focus of her research was Acadian history, and in particular the women of Acadia.

== Biography ==
Cohoon self-published her first novel Severine in 2007. The work was a dual narrative describing the life of a fictional woman of Grand-Pré, Nova Scotia who lived through the Acadian Expulsion and a modern-day woman's struggle with her Acadian identity.

She later discovered that she was a direct descendant of Jeanne Dugas and her husband Pierre Bois, who were one of the founding families of Chéticamp, Nova Scotia. She also discovered that when Bishop Joseph-Octave Plessis had visited Chéticamp in 1812 he had interviewed Dugas, and recorded the places she and her family encountered before their arrival in Chéticamp. Guided by this road map, census information, and various histories, church records, and contemporary journals, Cohoon was able to create a work of historical fiction outlining the difficult life of an Acadian woman in the time of the British deportation campaigns and beyond. Her novel Jeanne Dugas of Acadia was published in 2013 and its French translation appeared in 2019.

Cohoon's work helped to gain further recognition for Dugas. Dugas was named a Person of National Historic Significance by the Canadian government in 2014.

== Publications ==
- Severine. Shoreline Press. 2007. ISBN 978-0-969513-42-1.
- Jeanne Dugas of Acadia. Cape Breton University Press. 2013. ISBN 978-1-897009-71-0.
- Jeanne Dugas d'Acadie. La Grande Marée. 2019. ISBN 978-2-349723-82-6.
