= Alexandre Bourg =

Notary and King's attorney (1671–1760)

Alexandre Bourg dit Belle-Humeur (1671 – 1760) was a notary and King's attorney living in what is now Nova Scotia, Canada.

The son of François Bourg and Marguerite Boudrot, he was born in Port-Royal (later Annapolis Royal). Around 1694, he settled at Grand-Pré. Bourg married Marguerite Melanson; the couple had at least 16 children. After the British took over Acadia in 1710, he was named a notary for the Minas Basin area. On several occasions, he represented the Acadians of that region in delegations to the British authorities at Annapolis Royal. In 1730, Bourg was named king's attorney for Minas, Pisiquid, Cobequid and Chignecto. After being accused of negligence, he was removed from that post and his position of notary in 1737 by lieutenant-governor Lawrence Armstrong. However, in 1740, he was reinstated as notary and tax collector. In 1744, after he was accused again of negligence and of having been involved with his son-in-law Joseph Leblanc dit Le Maigre in aiding actions taken against the British, Bourg was removed from his position as notary.

By 1752, he was living with Leblanc at Port-Toulouse in a small house. When Louisbourg was captured in 1758, Bourg fled to Richibucto, where he later died at the age of 89.
