= Joseph Dugas (merchant) =

French merchant and privateer

- Born: 1714; Grand-Pré, Nova Scotia
- Died: 11 January 1779 (aged 64–65) Saint-Servan, France
- Allegiance: France
- Service years: 1729-1760

Joseph Dugas (1714 – January 11, 1779) was a merchant, privateer and militia officer of Acadian descent.

== Early life ==
The son of Joseph Dugas and Marguerite Richard, he was born in Grand-Pré, Nova Scotia and came to Île-Royale (later Cape Breton Island) with his family soon afterwards.

== Adult life ==
In 1729, he was commander of the Nouveau Commerçant, a ship involved in the trade between Louisbourg and Isle Saint-Jean and supplied the garrison at Louisbourg with firewood. In 1737, with two partners, he was given a charter for three years to supply the town and garrison at Louisbourg with fresh beef. Dugas continued to supply the garrison until 1745. After his ship was plundered at Tatamagouche, he retired to Minas. Dugas moved to Port-Toulouse after Île-Royale was returned to France at the end of the War of the Austrian Succession. After the Second Siege of Louisbourg, Dugas fled to Quebec where he was commissioned as a privateer. By winter 1760, he was a major in the militia based in the Baie des Chaleurs area. He was captured by British Captain Roderick MacKenzie and sent to Fort Cumberland and then Halifax. He escaped the following year, going to Chedabouctou.

Two years later, Dugas was living in Miquelon. Because of French policy, he left there for Saint-Malo but then was forced to return. In 1768, the British captured Saint Pierre and Miquelon and deported the inhabitants to France. Dugas died at Saint-Servan in January the following year.

== Personal life ==
He was married twice: first to Marguerite, the daughter of Joseph Leblanc, and then to Louise Arseneau in 1762.

His sister Jeanne was named a Person of National Historic Significance by the Canadian government.
