= Sainte-Anne du Ruisseau Church =

Canadian church

Église Sainte-Anne-du-Ruisseau
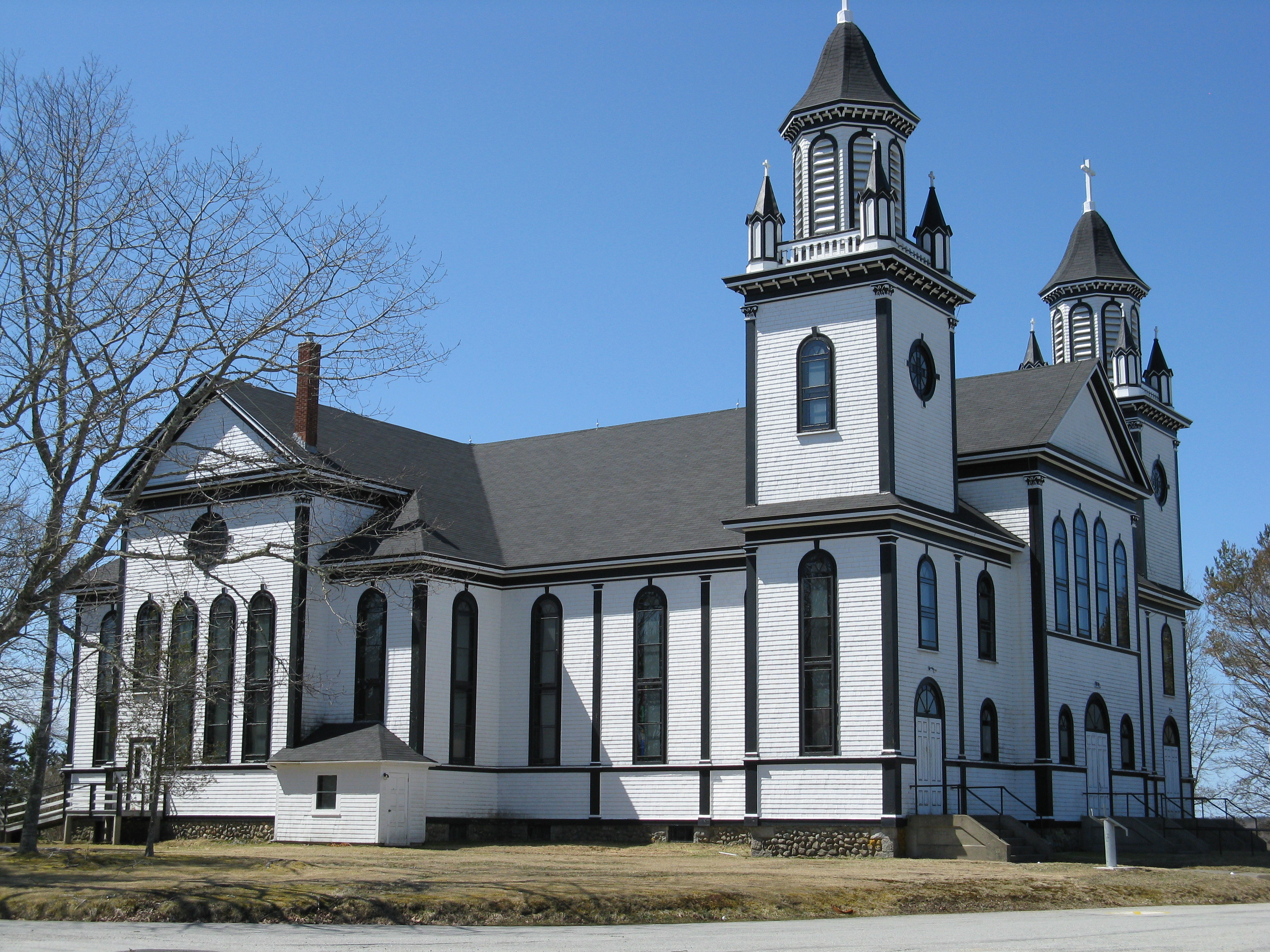

- Location within Nova Scotia

Religion
- Affiliation: Catholic
- District: Yarmouth County

Location
- Municipality: Argyle
- State: Nova Scotia
- Country: Canada
- Interactive map of Église Sainte-Anne-du-Ruisseau
- Coordinates: 43.8375°N 65.9350°W

Architecture
- General contractor: Ambroise Pottier
- Completed: 1901

The Sainte-Anne-du-Ruisseau Church, located in Yarmouth County in the Argyle district, is the oldest Acadian parish church on mainland Nova Scotia. The church has been designated a historic property by the Municipality of Argyle.

== History ==
=== Sainte-Anne Parish ===
The origins of Sainte-Anne Parish date back to 1767, when Acadians returned from exile and settled on the Rocco Point peninsula. In 1784, the first chapel in Yarmouth County was constructed at Rocco Point, following the repeal of a law prohibiting Catholics from establishing churches. This chapel served both the Acadian and Mi'kmaq communities in the region.

From 1784 to 1799, the parish was served by visiting missionaries, including Fathers Bailly, Bourg, LeDru, Phelan, Power, and Grace, before the arrival of Father Jean-Mandé Sigogne, who played a pivotal role in the parish’s history. The official founding of Sainte-Anne Parish is marked by Father Sigogne’s arrival on July 4, 1799.

Father Sigogne, who served as a missionary in the region from 1799 to 1820, was instrumental in preserving French and Catholic traditions among the Acadians of southwestern Nova Scotia.

=== Construction of the church ===
By 1800, natural population growth led to the establishment of new villages and the need for additional churches. In 1808, Father Sigogne initiated the construction of the first church at Sainte-Anne du Ruisseau, named after the village. The village was known by various names, and the church is sometimes referred to as "Sainte-Anne d’Eel Brook," a name given by the English due to the abundance of eels in the area.

The original Sainte-Anne Church was destroyed by fire on March 22, 1900. Within 13 months, Reverend Marie-Jules Crouzier oversaw the construction of the current building, which was completed in time for midnight mass later that year. The church was formally blessed in June 1902.

Today, a replica of the original church stands on the site as a commemorative tribute.

== Architecture ==
The church features two towers and original paintings on the ceiling and sanctuary walls. The current structure was designed by architect Dumaresque, with construction supervised by Ambroise Pottier of Belleville. The interior decorations were crafted by Billinberg, a painter-decorator renowned for his work on the church at Salmon River.

== See also ==
- Acadian Expulsion
- History of the Acadians
- Roman Catholicism in Canada
- Mi'kmaq
- Acadian diaspora

== Bibliography ==
- Campbell, Joan Bourque (1985). L'histoire de la paroisse de Sainte-Anne-du-Ruisseau (Eel Brook) [The history of the parish of Sainte-Anne-du-Ruisseau (Eel Brook)] (in French). Yarmouth, Nova Scotia: Lescarbot. p. 98. ISBN 0969155263.
- Boudreau, Gérald C. (May 1992). Le père Sigogne et les Acadiens du sud-ouest de la Nouvelle-Écosse [Father Sigogne and the Acadians of southwestern Nova Scotia] (in French). Montreal, Quebec: Les Éditions Bellarmin. p. 230. ISBN 9782890070233.
