= Thomas Beamish Akins =

Canadian historian (1809–1891)

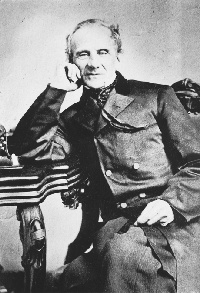
- Portrait of Thomas Beamish Akins (1809–1891), first Provincial Archivist of Nova Scotia.
- Born: February 1, 1809; Liverpool, Nova Scotia, Canada
- Died: May 6, 1891 (aged 82); Halifax, Nova Scotia, Canada

Thomas Beamish Akins (February 1, 1809 – May 6, 1891) was a Canadian lawyer, historian, archivist, and author who was appointed Nova Scotia's first Commissioner of Public Records from 1857 until his death in 1891. He was designated a Person of National Historic Significance by the Government of Canada.

Thomas Beamish Akins was the son of Thomas Akins, a merchant, and Margaret Ott Beamish. Akins' father was a descendant of the original New England Planters of Falmouth, Nova Scotia settled in 1761; his mother was the daughter of Halifax merchant Thomas Beamish of Port Warden, Nova Scotia. Akins was an only child, his mother having died ten days after his birth, he was raised by her family in Halifax, where he attended Halifax Grammar School. He studied Law and was called to the Nova Scotia bar on 3 May 1831.

Among his published works were his History of Halifax and A Sketch of the Rise and Progress of the Church of England in the British North American Provinces (Halifax, 1849), A Brief Account of the Origin, Endowment and Progress of the University of King’s College, Windsor, Nova Scotia (Halifax, 1865), and an article, "The First Council," in the Collections of the Nova Scotia Historical Society for 1879–80. He served as president of the Nova Scotia Historical Society from 1882–83 and was at the time of his death one of its vice-presidents. He was also an honorary or corresponding member of the Literary and Historical Society of Quebec, the American Historical Association, and the historical societies of Massachusetts, Maryland, and Texas.

Akins was a long-term member of the Royal Nova Scotia Historical Society.

Akins' house from 1858 to 1891, located in Halifax, was designated a National Historic Site of Canada.

== Bibliography ==
- Thomas Akins. History of Halifax City. Collections of the Nova Scotia Historical Society. 1895. p. 28
- Thomas Beamish Akins:British North America's Pioneer Archivist by B. C. Cuthbertson
- Cuthbertson, Brian C. (1990). "Akins, Thomas Beamish". In Halpenny, Francess G. (ed.). Dictionary of Canadian Biography. Vol. XII (1891–1900) (online ed.). University of Toronto Press.
- Thomas Atkins. Acadian French. Selections from the public documents of the province of Nova Scotia (1869)
- Thomas Akins Papers related to the French encroachment on Nova Scotia (1749-1754), and the War in North America (1754-1761), Vol. 3
- Papers for the first settlement of Halifax
- Thomas Akins. Papers related to the first establishment of a Representative Assembly in Nova Scotia (1755-1761), Vol. 5
