= Naomi E. S. Griffiths =

Canadian historian

Naomi Elizabeth Saundaus Griffiths (born 1934) is a Canadian historian. The historian John Grenier writes that she is "the premier scholar of the Acadians" and that her "magnum opus", From Migrant to Acadian, "on the growth of Acadian society and identity is the natural starting place for any study that touches on Acadian history." She is a Distinguished Research Professor in the history department at Carleton University. From Migrant to Acadian: A North American Border People received the Lionel Groulx Prize in 2006, which recognizes the best literary work published over the last year on the history of the French in North America.

== Selected works ==
- From Migrant to Acadian: A North American Border People, 1604-1755. McGill-Queen's University Press. 2005. ISBN 978-0-7735-2699-0.
- Contexts of Acadian History, 1686-1784. McGill-Queen's University Press. 1992. ISBN 978-0-7735-6320-9.
- "Acadians in Exile: the Experiences of Acadians in British Seaports". Acadiensis. IV (1): 67–84. Autumn 1974. JSTOR 30302475.
- The Acadian Deportation: Deliberate Perfidy Or Cruel Necessity?. Copp Clark. 1969. ISBN 9780773031005.
