= Port-Toulouse =

Coordinates: 45.6567°N 60.8669°W

Port-Toulouse was an Acadian village situated in the French colony of Île-Royale, which is now Cape Breton Island. It was located on the present site of the Nova Scotian village of St. Peter's, on the strait that separates Bras d'Or Lake from the Atlantic Ocean.

== History ==
After the Treaty of Utrecht (1713) when continental Acadia was ceded to Great Britain, France encouraged settlement by the Acadians on Île Royale, which was still in French possession. Port-Toulouse was thus founded in 1715 by Acadians from Plaisance and Grand-Pré, which was established near an old trading port founded in 1630 by merchants from La Rochelle and fortified by Nicolas Denys. Due to the strategic importance of the area, the French constructed a fort on the shoreline to protect Port-Toulouse, which became the logistical port and naval base for Louisbourg, situated 120 kilometres (75 mi) to the north.

Port-Toulouse and its fort were destroyed by the British when they took Louisbourg in 1758.

St. Peters was designated a National Historic Site in 1929, due in part to the former presence of Port-Toulouse. The designation is distinct from that of St. Peters Canal National Historic Site. Port-Toulouse was the site of annual ceremonies from 1720 to 1758 marking the renewal of a military alliance between the French and Mi'kmaq against the British. In recognition of this period, the 18th Century Mi'kmaw-French Alliance National Historic Event was announced in 2016.
