= Freemasonry in Canada =

Overview of Freemasons in Canada

The Masonic Square and Compasses. (Found with or without the letter G)

Freemasonry is a fraternal organisation that arose from the loose organization of medieval masons (i.e. stone workers) working in the medieval building industry.

== History ==
Freemasonry in Canada traces its origins to the United Grand Lodge of England, the Grand Lodge of Scotland and the Grand Lodge of Ireland, as a result of Canada's history as a dominion within the British Empire. Freemasonry in the United States, including Prince Hall Freemasonry, also influenced the formation of Freemasonry in Canada. Erasmus James Philipps became a Freemason while working on a commission to resolve boundaries in New England and, in 1739, became provincial grand master for Nova Scotia; Philipps founded the first Masonic lodge in Canada at Annapolis Royal, Nova Scotia. The Castle Island Virtual Lodge No. 190 is an example of an internet lodge whereby meetings are conducted online rather than in person.

== Masonic Fathers of Confederation ==
At the time of confederation in 1867, eleven men of the 37 Fathers of Confederation were Freemasons.

- Hewitt Bernard – Lawyer, Recording Secretary at the Charlottetown Conference
- Alexander Campbell – Senator (1867–1887), Lieutenant Governor of Ontario (1897–1892)
- Frederick Carter – First Premier of Newfoundland
- Edward Barron Chandler – Lieutenant Governor of New Brunswick (1878–1880)
- Alexander Tilloch Galt – Minister of Finance (1867), Founder of the North Western Coal and Navigation Company and Lethbridge, AB
- John Hamilton Gray – Premier of New Brunswick (1856–1857)
- Thomas Heath Haviland – Senator (1873–1879), Lieutenant Governor of Prince Edward Island (1879–1884)
- William Alexander Henry – Mayor of Halifax (1870–1871), Supreme Court Justice (1875–1888)
- John A. Macdonald – First Prime Minister (1867–1873, 1878–1891)
- William Henry Pope – Lawyer, Newspaper Editor, Colonial Secretary
- Samuel Leonard Tilley – Pharmacist, Premier of New Brunswick (1861–1865), Lieutenant Governor of New Brunswick (1885–1893 and 1873–1878), Originator of "Dominion" in Canada's name

== Other Notable Canadian Masons ==
=== Governors ===
- Harold Alexander, 1st Earl Alexander of Tunis – Governor General of Canada (1946–1952)
- Lord Frederick Arthur Stanley, 16th Earl of Derby – Governor General of Canada (1888–1893), Namesake for the Stanley Cup
- John Graves Simcoe – British Army general, Founder of York (Toronto), Introduced English common law, First Lieutenant Governor of Upper Canada (1791–1796)
- Henry Cockshutt – Lieutenant Governor of Ontario (1921–1927)
- William Mulock – (Acting) Lieutenant Governor of Ontario (1931–1932), Postmaster General (1896–1905)
- John Keiller MacKay – 19th Lieutenant Governor of Ontario (1957-1963)

=== Politicians ===
- John Abbott – Prime Minister (1891–1892)
- Richard Bedford Bennett – Prime Minister (1930–1935)
- Robert Laird Borden – Prime Minister (1911–1920)
- Sir MacKenzie Bowell – Prime Minister (1894–1896)
- John Diefenbaker – Prime Minister (1957–1963)
- Thomas C. Douglas – Premier of Saskatchewan (1944–1961), Leader of New Democratic Party (1961–1971), father of Universal Healthcare, voted as The Greatest Canadian
- George Alexander Drew – Premier of Ontario (1943–1948)
- George Howard Ferguson – Premier of Ontario (1923–1930)
- Donald Methuen Fleming – Minister of Finance (1957–1962), Minister of Justice and Attorney General (1962–1963)
- Ezra Butler Eddy – Businessman, Mayor of Hull, Quebec, Member of Legislative Assembly of Quebec
- Leslie Miscampbell Frost – Premier of Ontario (1949–1961)
- Mitchell Frederick Hepburn – Youngest Premier of Ontario (1934–1942) at age 37
- Alexander Keith – Mayor of Halifax (1853–1853), President of Legislative Council of Nova Scotia (1867–1873), Founder of Alexander Keith's Brewery
- James Kirkpatrick Kerr – Lawyer, Senator (1903–1916), Speaker of the Senate (1909–1911)
- John Ross Matheson – Lawyer, Judge, MP for Leeds (1961–1968), Helped develop the maple leaf flag and the Order of Canada.
- Nathan Phillips – Mayor of Toronto (1955–1962)
- Erasmus James Philipps – Member of the Nova Scotia Council (1730-1760)
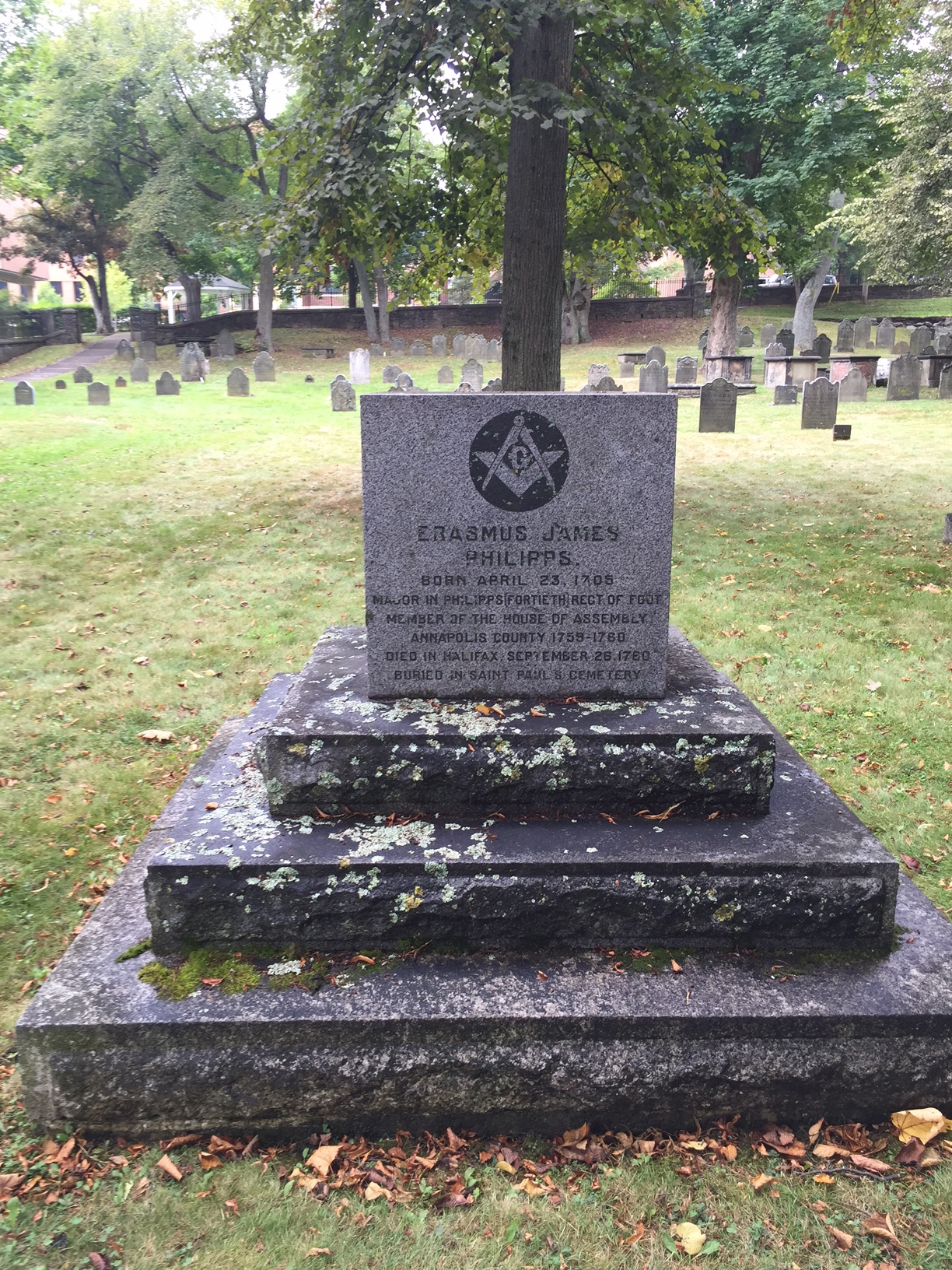
  Erasmus James Philipps, Old Burying Ground (Halifax, Nova Scotia)
- Alexander Cameron Rutherford – First Premier of Alberta (1905–1910)
- Allen Bristol Aylesworth – Senator, MP for York North, Postmaster General of Canada
- George Ryerson – MPP for Toronto
- Joey Smallwood – First Premier of Newfoundland, self-dubbed "The Last Father of Confederation"
- William Grenville "Bill" Davis – 18th Premier of Ontario
- Bob Bailey – MPP for Sarnia-Lambton
- John Babington Macaulay Baxter - 19th Premier of New Brunswick
- John Keiller MacKay – 19th Lieutenant Governor of Ontario (1957)
- Colin Thatcher – Minister of Energy Saskatchewan, (1975-1984), convicted of murdering his wife, St. George's Lodge No. 136, Moose Jaw, SK

=== Businessmen ===
- Harold Ballard – Businessman and Sportsman
- Samuel Bronfman – Businessman and Philanthropist
- John David Eaton – Businessman, Member of the Eaton family
- John Bayne Maclean – Publisher, Founder of Maclean's magazine, the Financial Post and the Maclean Publishing Company
- Colonel Samuel McLaughlin – Businessman, Philanthropist, Founder of the McLaughlin Motor Car Company
- John Molson – Businessman, Founder of Molson Brewery
- Joseph Seagram – Founder of Seagram Distilleries
- Roy Thomson, 1st Baron Thomson of Fleet – Newspaper Proprietor, Fleet Street Mogul, Namesake for Roy Thomson Hall, Appointed Knight Grand Cross of the Order of the British Empire

=== Military ===
- Arthur William Currie – Inspector-General of the Canadian Army and vice-chancellor of McGill University
- Alexander Roberts Dunn – Soldier, awarded the Victoria Cross
- John MacGregor – (1889–1952) Born in Scotland, lived in Powell River B.C., fought in 2 world wars, awarded the Victoria Cross
- Sam Steele – Head of the RCMP Yukon detachment during the Klondike Gold Rush
- General James Wolfe – Victor in 1759 over the French at the Battle of the Plains of Abraham in Quebec
- Joseph Brant (Thayendanegea) – Six Nations Reserve Mohawk leader
- Captain Arthur Roy Brown – WWI flying ace
- Wilfrid Reid "Wop" May – WWI flying ace, final pursuit of Manfred von Richthofen
- Sir William Dillon Otter – First Canadian-born Chief of the General Staff

=== Science and Engineering ===
- Sandford Fleming – Engineer, Inventor, Founding member of the Royal Society of Canada, Founder of the Canadian Institute, Inventor of Worldwide Time Zones
- Kivas Tully – Chief Provincial Architect for Ontario (1868–1896), Imperial Service Order Recipient
- Henry Asbjørn Larsen – Arctic explorer
- William George Storm - Architect of St. Andrew's Church (Toronto) and parts of the University of Toronto

=== Sports ===
- Francis Michael “King” Clancy – NHL hockey player
- Charles William "The Big Bomber" Conacher, Sr. – NHL hockey player
- Norman Dawe – ice hockey and sports executive
- Hanson Dowell – ice hockey administrator and politician, Master at Ionic Lodge No. 73
- George Dudley – ice hockey administrator and lawyer
- W. A. Fry – sports administrator and newspaper publisher
- Jake Gaudaur, Jr. – CFL football player and 4th Commissioner
- W. B. George – sports administrator and agriculturalist
- Doug Grimston – ice hockey administrator
- Tim Horton – Hockey Player, Co-founder of Tim Hortons
- Atholl Layton – Professional wrestler
- Dr. James Naismith – Inventor of Basketball
- Art Potter – ice hockey administrator
- Frank Sargent – executive in ice hockey and curling
- Frederick Wellington "Cyclone" Taylor – Hockey Player
- W. F. Taylor – ice hockey administrator and dentist
- Angus James Walters – Captain of the Bluenose
- William "Whipper" John Potts – World champion professional wrestler

=== Clergy ===
- Frederick Kingston – Bishop of Diocese of Algoma (1939–1944), Primate of the Anglican Church of Canada (1947–1949)
- Most Rev. Derwyn Trevor Owen – Bishop of Niagara (1925–1932), Bishop of Toronto (1932–1934), Primate of the Anglican Church of Canada (1934–1947)
- Clarendon Worrell – Bishop of Nova Scotia (1904–1915), Primate of the Anglican Church of Canada (1932–1934)

=== Arts ===
- Glenn Ford – Actor from Classical Hollywood cinema including Superman (1978)
- Watson Kirkconnell - Canadian poet, literary translator, and father of multiculturalism in Canada.
- Robert William Service – Writer, Author of Poems The Shooting of Dan McGrew and The Cremation of Sam McGee
- Gordon Sinclair – Journalist, Writer, Commentator, Known for The Americans

=== Others ===
- Herbert Allan Borden Leal – Civil servant and academic
- Hon. Dana H. Porter – Chief Justice of the Court of Appeal for Ontario

== Notable Masonic buildings in Canada ==
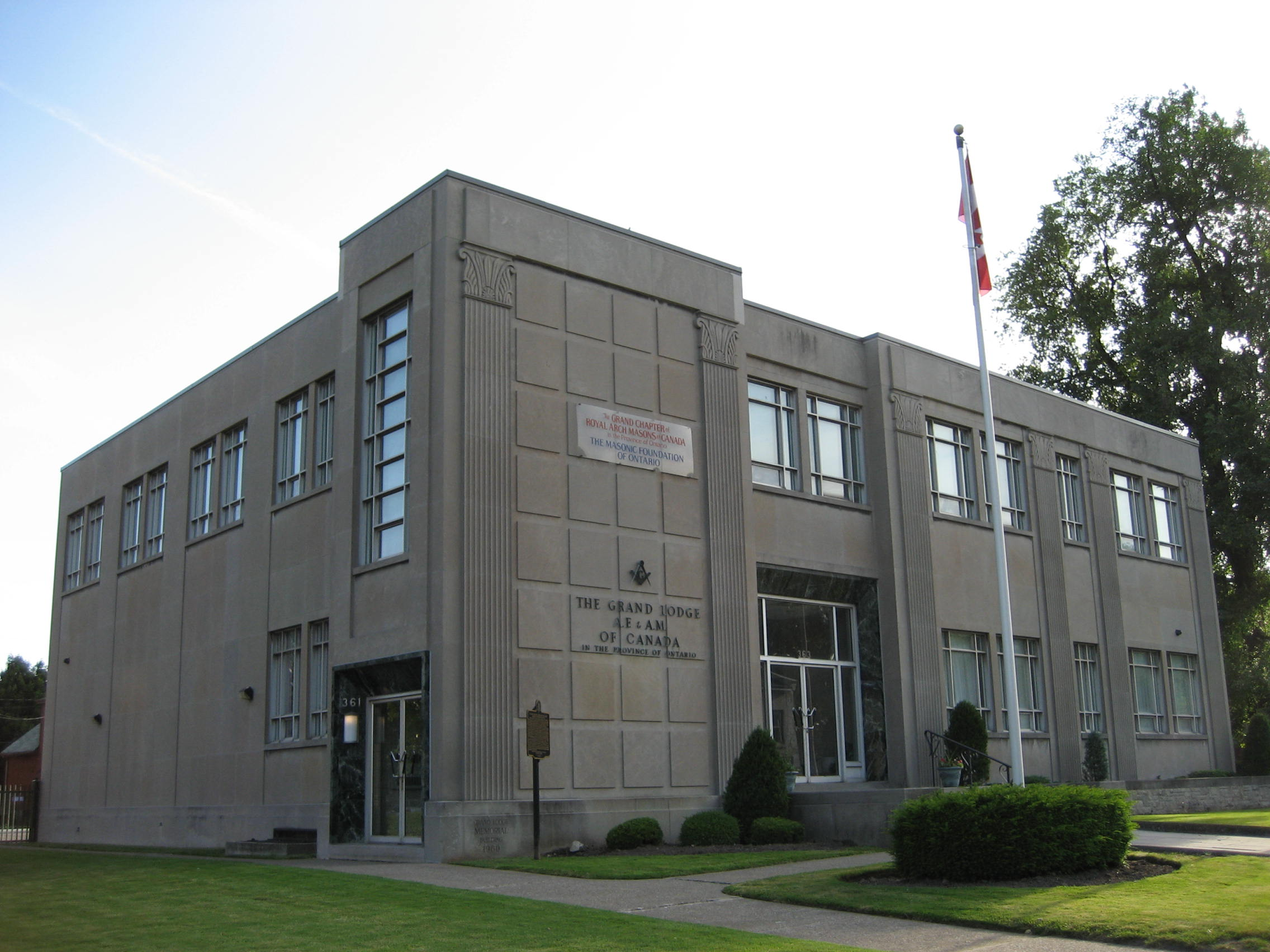
Grand Lodge of Canada, King Street West, Hamilton, Ontario

- Grand Lodge of Canada in the Province of Ontario, King Street West, Hamilton, Ontario
- Toronto Masonic Temple, 888 Yonge Street. No longer affiliated with Freemasonry
- Masonic Temple (St. John's, Newfoundland and Labrador)
- Montreal Masonic Memorial Temple, Montreal, QC
- Saint John Masonic Temple, Saint John, New Brunswick
- St. Mark's Masonic Lodge, Baddeck, NS

== Governing bodies ==
There is a number of various organisations (Grand Lodges, National Lodges, Grand Orients, and Federations) active in Canada representing a number of regularity / amity networks along with a number of independent lodges.

== See also ==
- List of Freemasons
- Freemasonry
