= Erasmus Philipps =

Erasmus Philipps may refer to:

- Sir Erasmus Philipps, 5th Baronet (1699–1743), British politician
- Sir Erasmus Philipps, 3rd Baronet (c. 1623–1697), Welsh politician
- Erasmus James Philipps (1705–1760), politician in Nova Scotia
