= Grand Lodge of Newfoundland and Labrador =

Grand Lodge of Newfoundland and Labrador of Ancient Free & Accepted Masons
- Founded: 1 November 1997
- Founder: United Grand Lodge of England
- Type: Fraternal organization
- Headquarters: Freemason's Hall, Mount Pearl, Newfoundland and Labrador, Canada
- Region served: Newfoundland and Labrador, Canada
- Key people: W. Donald Vokey (Grand Master)

The Grand Lodge of Newfoundland and Labrador of Ancient Free & Accepted Masons is the regular Grand Lodge with authority over Freemasons in the Canadian province of Newfoundland and Labrador. It was consecrated on November 1, 1997, with 32 lodges by the United Grand Lodge of England. Its current Grand Master is Most Worshipful Brother W. Donald Vokey.

The Grand Lodge used to be headquartered in the historic Masonic Temple in St. John's, which it shared with the other regular body of craft masonry in Newfoundland and Labrador, the District Grand Lodge of Newfoundland and Labrador of the Grand Lodge of Scotland, in addition to several appendant bodies. Since 2009, the headquarters is now located in Freemason's Hall, in the city of Mount Pearl.

As of 2026, there are 25 lodges.

== See also ==
- List of Masonic Grand Lodges in Canada
