= List of Masonic Grand Lodges in Canada =

This is a list of all verifiable organizations that claim to be a Masonic Grand Lodge in Canada.

A Masonic "Grand Lodge" (or sometimes "Grand Orient") is the governing body that supervises the individual "Lodges of Freemasons" in a particular geographical area, known as its "jurisdiction" (usually corresponding to a sovereign state or other major geopolitical unit). Some are large, with thousands of members divided into hundreds of subordinate lodges, while others are tiny, with only a few members split between a handful of local lodges. Sometimes there will only be one Grand Lodge in a given area, but the majority of the time there will be at least two. More often, there will be several competing Grand Lodges claiming the same jurisdictional area, or claiming overlapping areas. This fact leads to debates over legitimacy: Not all Grand Lodges and Grand Orients recognize each other as being legitimate. However, such recognition is not relevant to this list, yet recognition is foundational within the fraternal order. Inclusion in this list only requires the establishment of a physical (as opposed to a virtual, or online) presence, and lodges (regular, unrecognized or clandestine) which acknowledge their governance.

Membership numbers are subject to change; for current figures, check the sources which are indicated in the reference section.

== Canada ==
| State, province, or other geographical area | Headquarters City | Name | Founded | Lodges | Members | Notes |
|---|---|---|---|---|---|---|
| Alberta | Calgary | Grand Lodge of Alberta | 1905 | 116 | 5,900 | CGMNA |
| Quebec | Montréal | Grande Loge ANI du Canada (Grand Lodge ANI of Canada) | 2009 | 5 | 100 | CLIPSAS, COMAM, SCIC; The name "ANI" is an homage to the medieval Armenian city of Ani. |
| British Columbia Yukon | Vancouver | Grand Lodge of British Columbia & the Yukon | 1871 | 134 | 5,799 | CGMNA |
| Canada | | Le Droit Humain — Fédération canadienne | 1980 | 3 | | DH |
| Canada | | Gran Logia de Lengua Española de Canada (Spanish Language) | | 5 | | |
| Manitoba | Winnipeg | Grand Lodge of Manitoba | 1875 | 54 | 1,873 | CGMNA |
| Quebec | | Grande Loge Nationale du Canada | 1985 | 16 | | CLIPSAS, COMAM |
| New Brunswick | Saint John | Grand Lodge of New Brunswick | 1867 | 36 | 2,657 | CGMNA |
| Newfoundland and Labrador | St. John's | Grand Lodge of Newfoundland and Labrador | 1997 | 28 | 1,532 | CGMNA |
| Nova Scotia | | Grand Lodge of Nova Scotia | 1866 | 87 | 4,261 | CGMNA |
| Ontario | Hamilton | Grand Lodge of Canada in the Province of Ontario | 1855 | 521 | 36,733 | CGMNA |
| Ontario Quebec | | Prince Hall Grand Lodge of Ontario and Jurisdiction | 1856 | 10 | | PHCGM, PHA |
| Prince Edward Island | | Grand Lodge of Prince Edward Island | 1875 | 15 | 576 | CGMNA |
| Quebec | Montréal | Grande Loge du Québec | 1869 | 74 | 3,617 | CGMNA |
| Quebec | | Grande Loge Mixte du Québec | 1979 | 3 | | |
| Saskatchewan | Regina | Grand Lodge of Saskatchewan | 1906 | 50 | 2,278 | CGMNA |
| Quebec | | Grand Orient du Québec | 2012 | 5 | | |

The Grand Lodge of Scotland has a District Grand Lodge of Newfoundland and Labrador responsible for 11 lodges.

The Grand Lodge of Alberta also includes the Northwest Territories, particularly a lodge in Yellowknife, although there used to be a lodge in Inuvik in the 2000s (Far North Lodge).

== See also ==
- List of Masonic Grand Lodges in North America
