= John Smith Archibald =

Canadian architect (1872–1934)

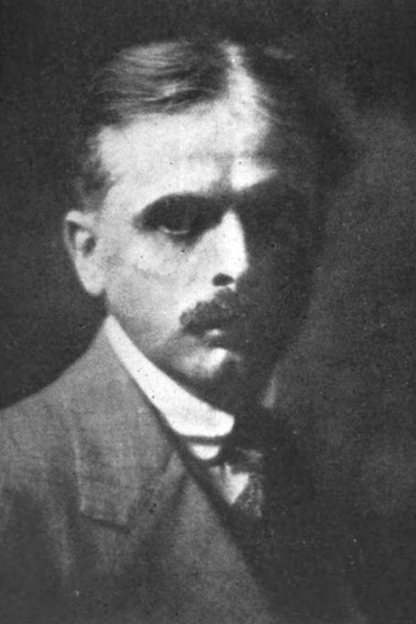
- Born: December 14, 1872; Inverness, Scotland
- Died: March 2, 1934 (aged 61); Montreal, Quebec, Canada
- Occupation: Architect

John Smith Archibald (December 14, 1872 – March 2, 1934) was a Canadian architect.

== Biography ==
John Smith Archibald was born in Inverness, Scotland on December 14, 1872. He arrived in Montreal in 1893. He worked as chief architect in Edward Maxwell's cabinet. Archibald and his colleague Charles Saxe then started their own firm until 1915. Archibald was president of the Royal Architectural Institute of Canada 1924-1925 and was elected a fellow in 1930. He built several prominent hotels for Canadian National Railway, including the Windsor Hotel, Château Laurier, Halifax Hotel, and the Hotel Vancouver. He also worked on several projects in Montreal, including the Montreal Masonic Memorial Temple, the Emmanuel Congregational Church, and the École polytechnique de Montréal. Other significant commissions included the Montreal Forum, Baron Byng High School, Elizabeth Ballantyne School, the Queen's University gymnasium and swimming pool in Kingston (1930), and three Montreal hospitals: the Royal Edward Institute, the Montreal Convalescent Hospital, and St. Mary's Hospital.

He died at Montreal General Hospital on March 2, 1934.

== Works ==
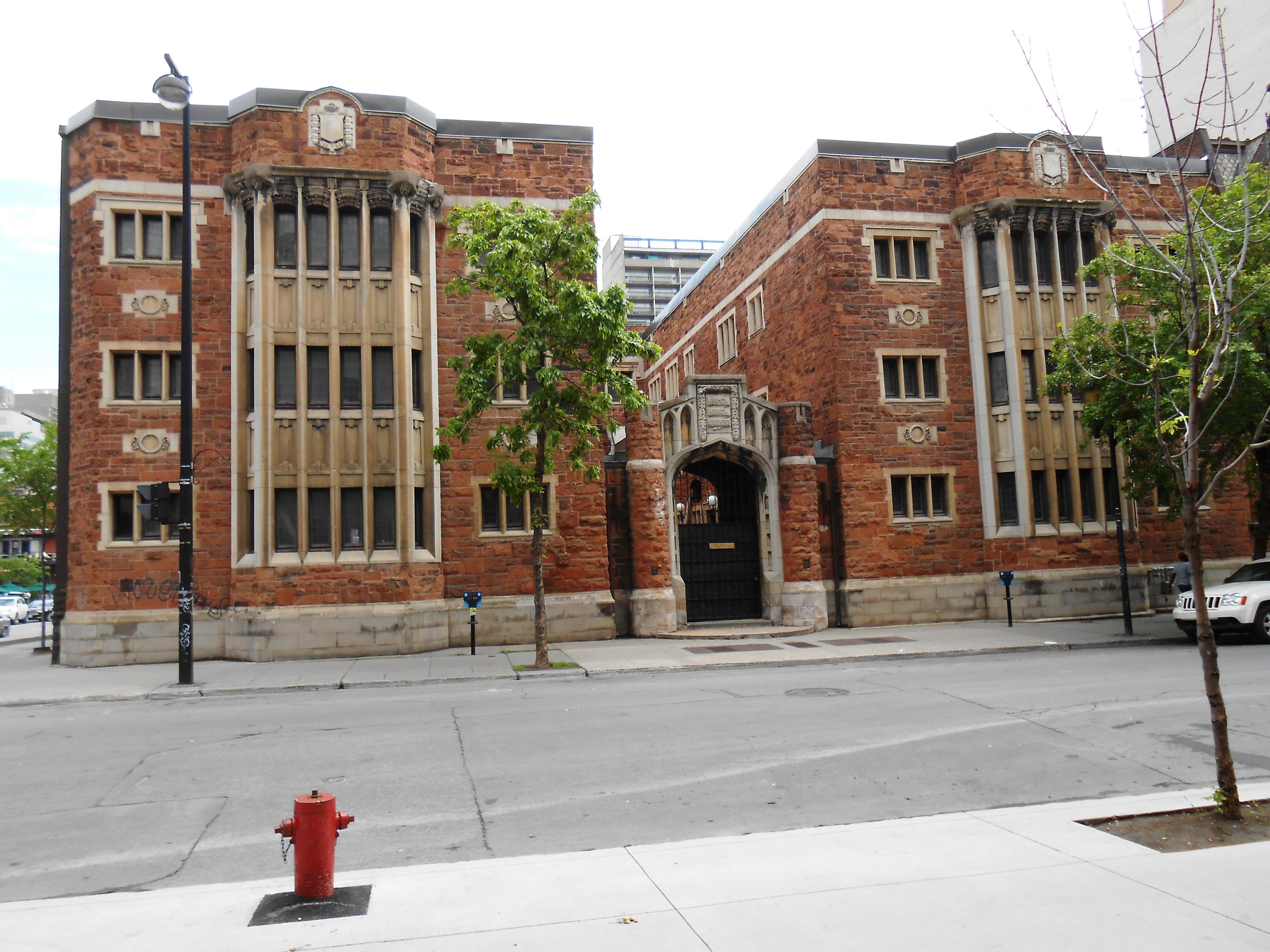
Bishop Court

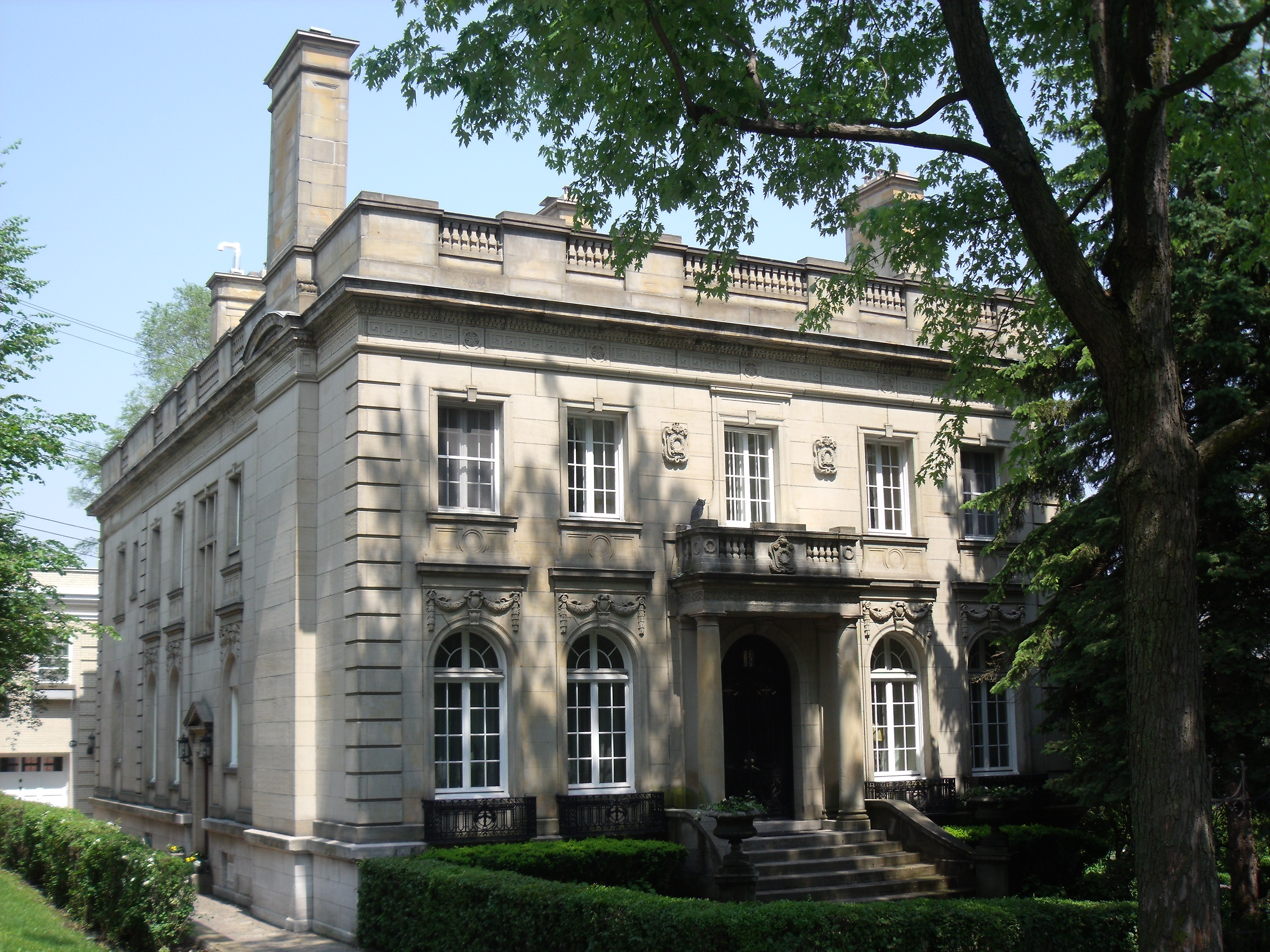
Rabinovitch

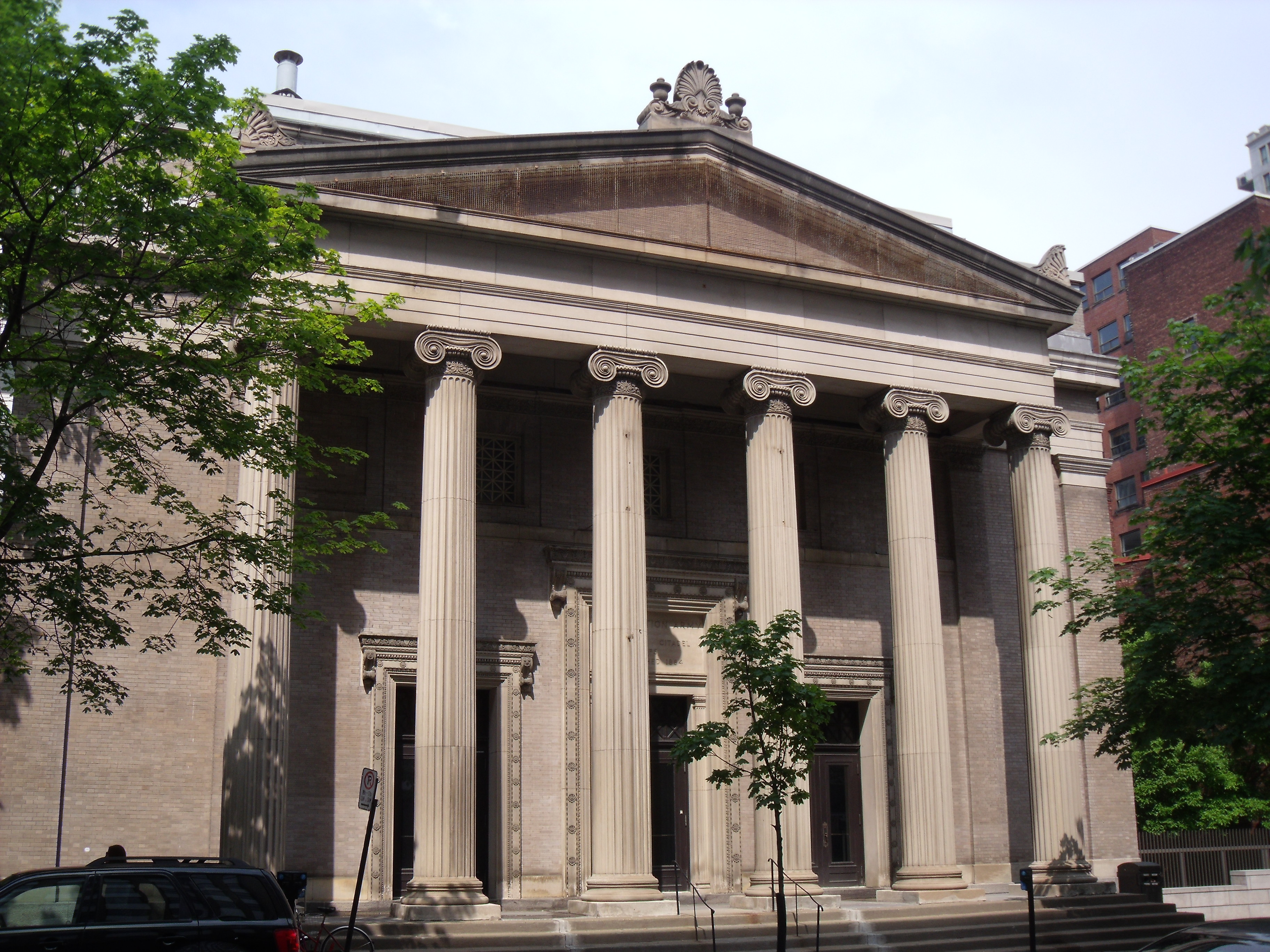
Citadel

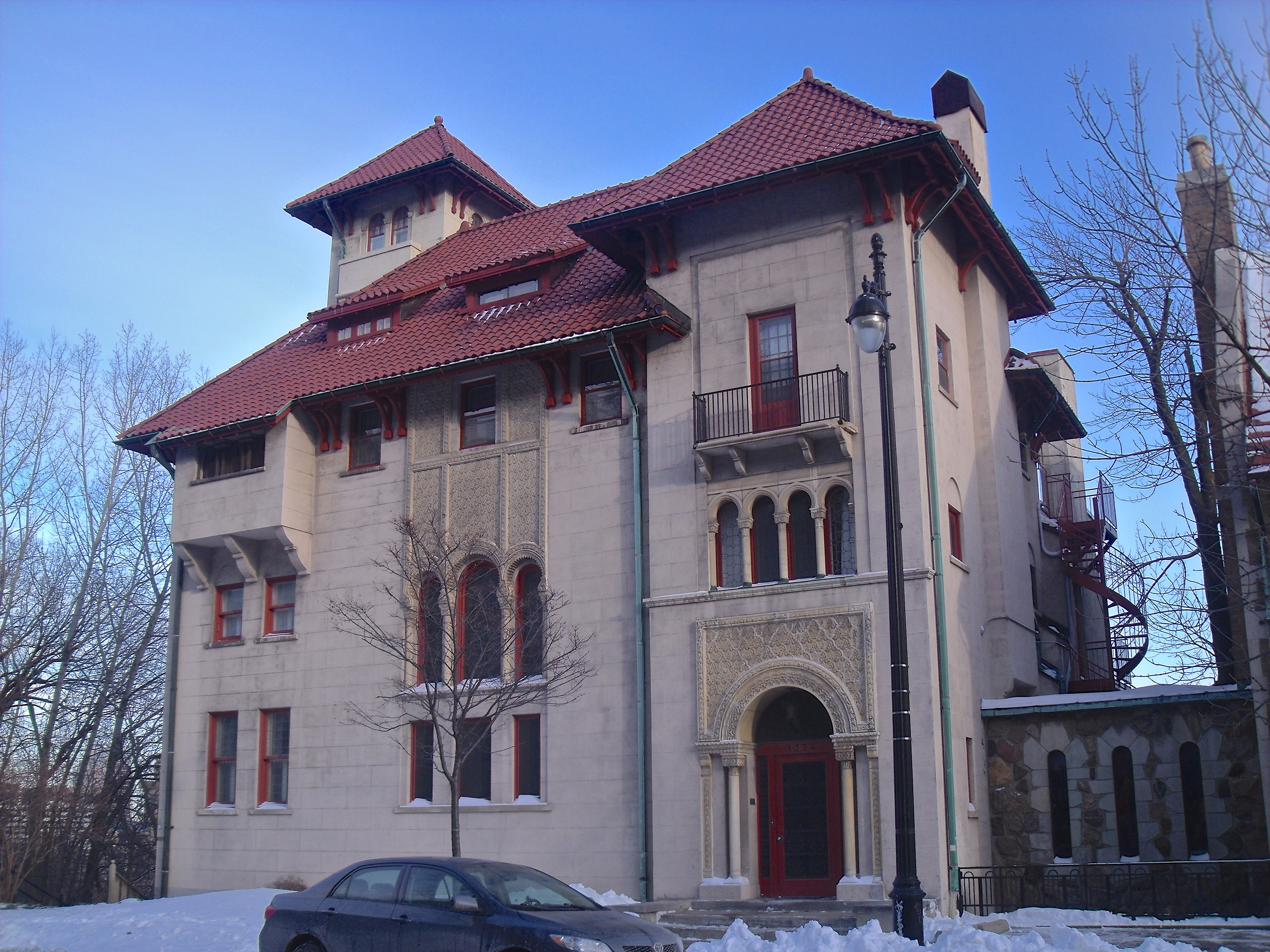
Clarence I. de Sola

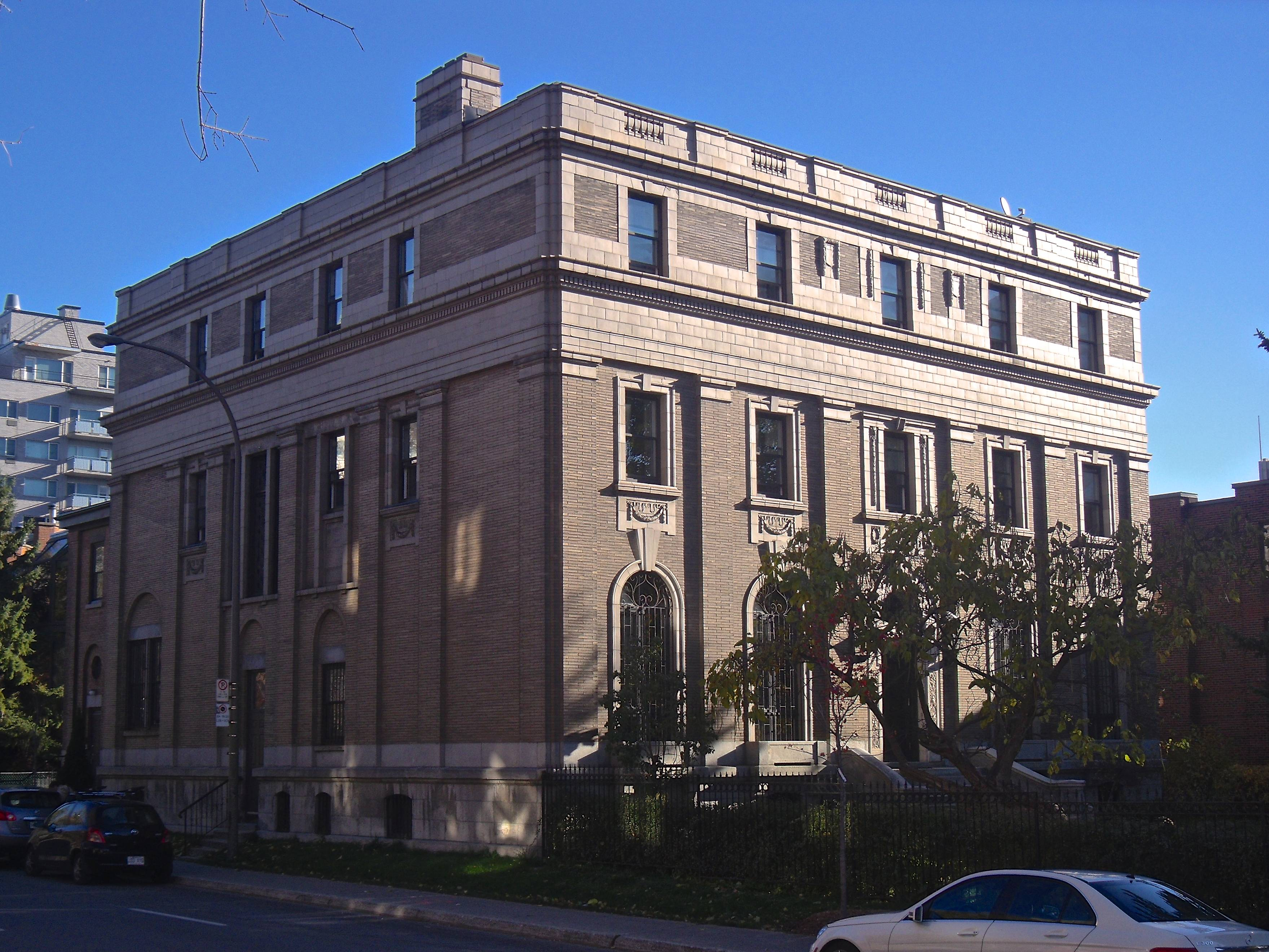
Joseph-Marcelin Wilson

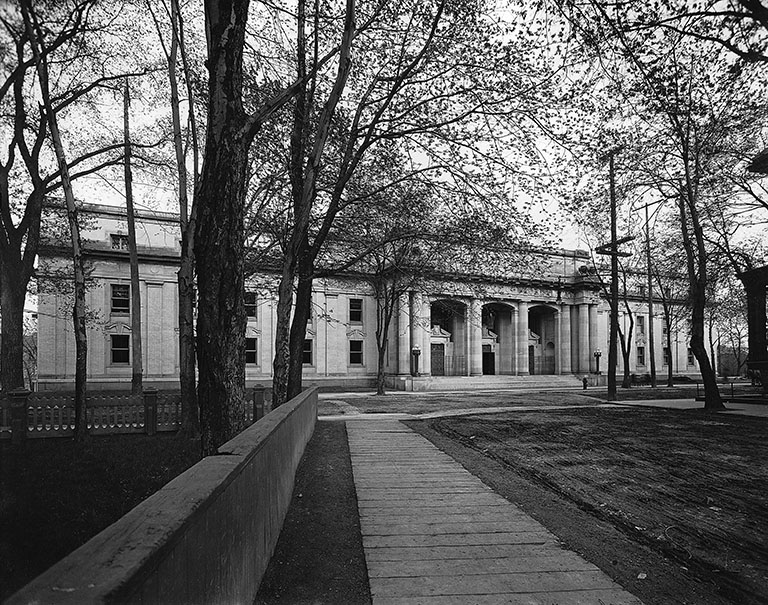
Technical School

== See also ==
- List of Quebec architects
