= Montreal Masonic Memorial Temple =

Historic building in Montreal, Canada

- French: Temple maçonnique de Montréal
- Montreal Masonic Memorial Temple
- Interactive map of the Montreal Masonic Memorial Temple area
- Alternative names: Grand Lodge of Quebec; French: Grande loge du Québec

General information
- Status: Operational
- Architectural style: Beaux-Arts
- Location: Downtown Montreal, 2295 St. Marc Street and 1850 Sherbrooke Street West, Montreal, Quebec, Canada
- Coordinates: 45.494645°N 73.582982°W
- Current tenants: Various Masonic Lodges, Julien-Leblanc Traiteur and Centre De La Petite Enfance Genesis 87
- Construction started: 1929
- Completed: 1930
- Inaugurated: June 22, 1929
- Owner: Masonic Foundation of Quebec
- Landlord: Masonic Foundation of Quebec

Height
- Top floor: 7

Technical details
- Lifts/elevators: 2

Design and construction
- Architect: John Smith Archibald
- Awards: Royal Architectural Institute of Canada First Award, Class I, Monumental Buildings

National Historic Site of Canada
- Designated: 2001

Patrimoine culturel du Québec
- Type: Immeuble patrimonial classé
- Designated: 2012

The Montreal Masonic Memorial Temple (French: Temple maçonnique de Montréal) is a historic masonic temple in Montreal, Quebec, Canada, on the corner of Sherbrooke Street and St. Marc Street, in the Golden Square Mile district. Dedicated and officially opened June February 12, 1930, it was designated a National Historic Site of Canada in 2001, as an example of one of Canada’s most elegant buildings in the Beaux-Arts style.

== History ==
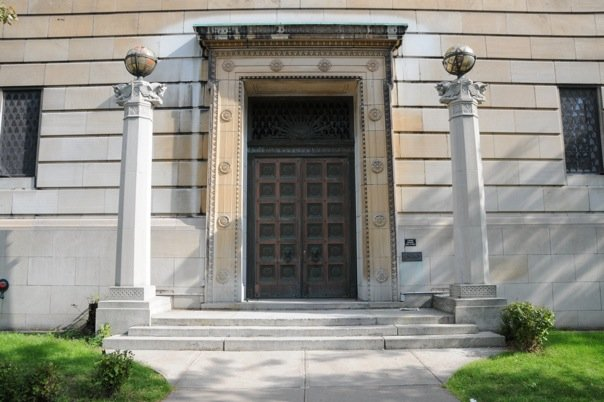
Main door of the Grand Lodge of Quebec flanked by the columns Boaz and Jachin.

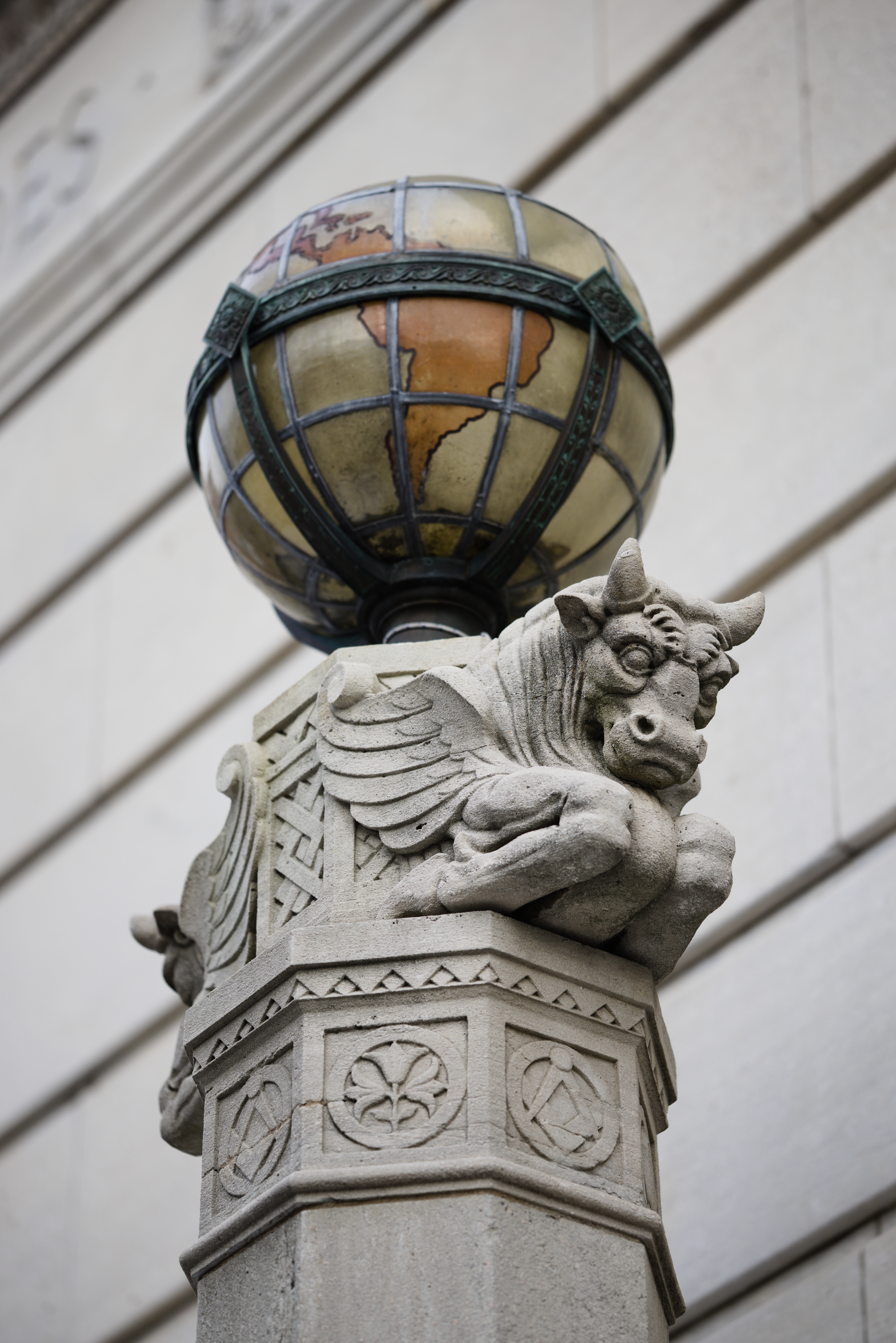
Detail of the globe-and-bull sculpture atop one of the pillars.

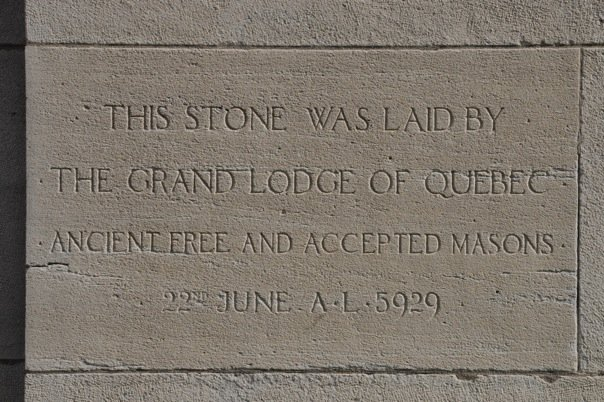
Dedication cornerstone dated 22 June, A.L. 5929

The Masonic Memorial Temple was conceived as a meeting place for the Masonic order as well as a memorial to Freemasons who gave their lives during World War I, replacing a Masonic Temple that had existed in a mixed-use building on Dorchester Street since 1895. The order had renovations done in 1908 and began to raise funds for a new building in 1923. In 1928, they contracted architect John Smith Archibald, who had previously renovated the Dorchester Street Temple, to design a new temple and supervise its construction.

The ceremonial laying of the cornerstone took place on June 22, 1929, with thirty-six lodges and 2,000 Masons parading to the new temple from the Dorchester Street Temple. The Grand Lodge of Quebec met for the first time in the new temple on February 12, 1930, at its 60th Annual Communication, on February 12, 1930. The temple commemorates Masons who died in the First and Second World Wars and the Korean War.

== Design ==
The façades on Sherbrooke and St-Marc streets and are covered with Queenston limestone. The main facade, on Sherbrooke, has a base made of rusticated limestone and features four openings as well as a prominent central entrance, flanked by two free-standing columns topped by terrestrial and celestial spheres. The main door is made of detailed architectural bronze. A decorative belt course defines the upper part of the base and consists of ornamental carving and words in relief: FIDES, VERITAS, CARITAS, LIBERTAS, SPES ("Faith", "Truth", "Charity", "Liberty", and "Hope" in Modern English).

A December 1930 issue of Construction, "A Journal for the architectural, engineering and contracting interests of Canada" featured an illustrated article, praised the Temple:

Neither our great Canadian classicists nor such well-known American practitioners as McKim, Mead and White have produced anything finer in Grecian adaptation than this Montreal building. As a work of architectural merit it ranks with Henry Bacon’s Lincoln Memorial, John Russell Pope’s Temple of the Scottish Rite and McKim, Mead and White’s J.P. Morgan Library. The modern Canadian buildings that are nearest to its class are Cobb’s Toronto Registry Office and Lyle’s Bank of Nova Scotia, at Ottawa.

One year later, the Royal Architectural Institute of Canada gave its First Award, Class I, Monumental Buildings, to the Montreal temple.

== Conservation ==
On January 30, 2010, the Honourable W. David Angus, Senator, has announced that the Government of Canada is delivering infrastructure funding of $425'000 to the Masonic Memorial Temple National Historic Site of Canada.
