= Masonic Temple (St. John's, Newfoundland and Labrador) =

Historic site located in St. John's, Newfoundland and Labrador

Coordinates: 47°33′56.71″N 52°42′27.13″W

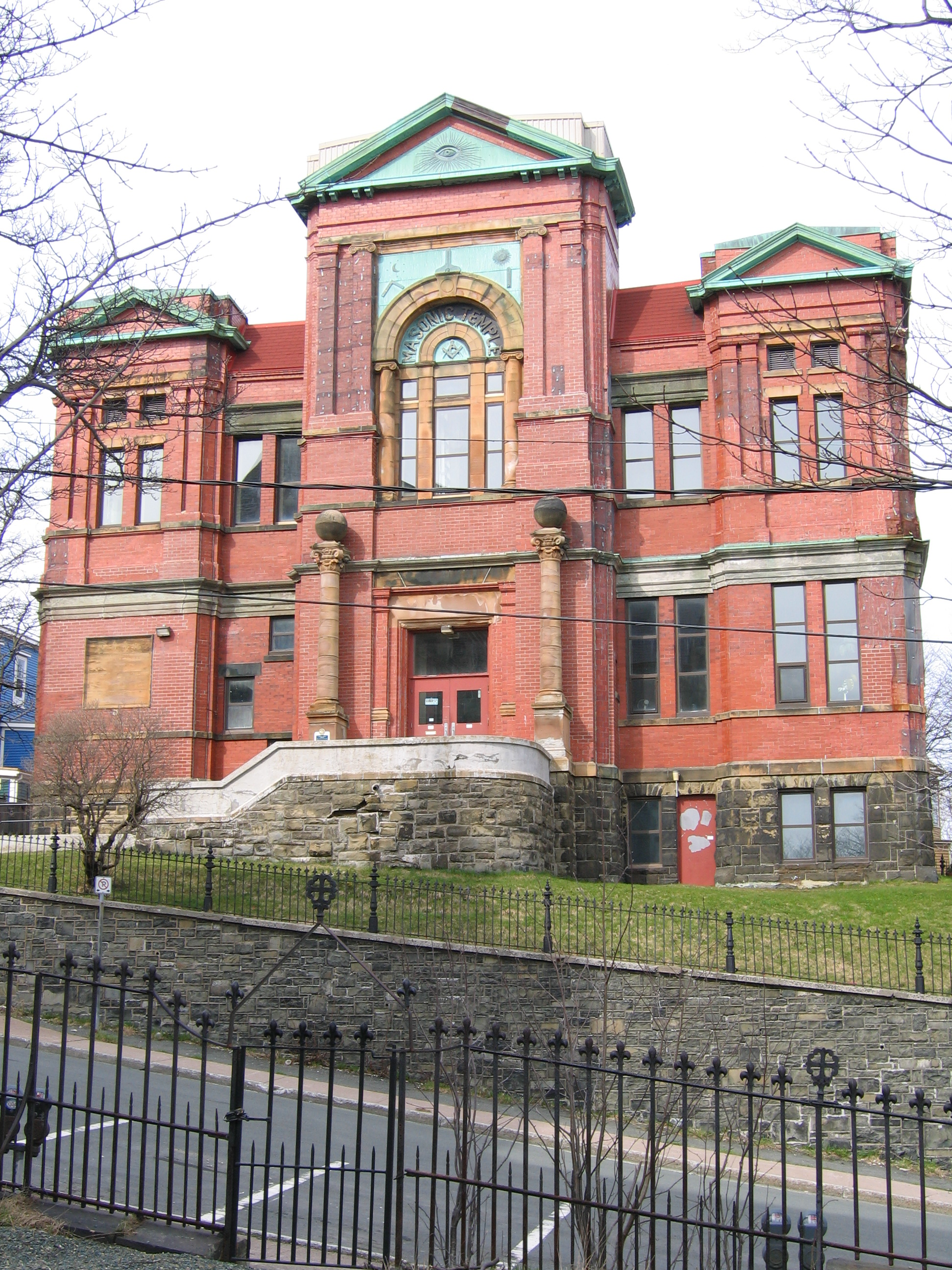
Masonic Temple

The Masonic Temple built in 1894 at St. John's, Newfoundland, Canada is an example of Victorian construction which includes pilasters, free-standing columns and multiple pediments. The Masonic Temple was designated a Registered Heritage Structure by the Heritage Foundation of Newfoundland and Labrador in April 1995.

== Construction and Design ==
The cornerstone was laid in a Masonic ceremony conducted by Newfoundland prime minister (and Freemason) Sir William Whiteway, held on 23 August 1894.

The building was constructed from large bricks imported from Accrington and built upon a stone foundation. It is three stories and contains several classical motifs, it includes pilasters, free-standing columns and multiple pediments. An elaborate pipe organ decorates the main room which was dedicated on April 28, 1916, with a large portion of the funding contributed by Sir John Chalker Crosbie.

The Freemasons held the first Masonic meeting in the structure on 1 November 1896, and the building was formally dedicated 23 April 1897.

The St. John's Masonic Temple is the most architecturally impressive fraternal lodge in Newfoundland, and has the distinction of being the largest brick fraternal meeting hall in the province. As such, it holds a unique place in the architectural history of the province, and stands as an important example of Victorian lodge construction even when viewed in a much wider Canadian context.

== Use Post-Temple ==
The last Masonic meeting in the temple was held in June 2007, and there is no longer any Masonic connection with the building, and no Masonic events are held there. A new Masonic building was constructed in Mount Pearl. In 2018, the District Grand Lodge of Newfoundland and Labrador, Grand Lodge Scotland, marked its 150th anniversary as an organization in the province.

Kathie Hicks and Peter Halley bought the building in 2008 to house a local for-profit theatre company, Spirit of Newfoundland. It was used by artists of all artistic genres, with the core business being dinner and show. Restoration work by the company since its purchase ran into building code and funding issues. In 2020, the building was put up for sale after business declined during the COVID-19 pandemic.
