= Grand Lodge of Quebec =

- Established: October 20, 1869; 157 years ago
- Location: Canada
- Website: glquebec.org

The Grand Lodge of Quebec (French: Grande Loge du Québec) is a Grand Lodge in Quebec, Canada. It is in full amity and recognition with the United Grand Lodge of England.

== History ==
The Grand Lodge of Quebec (GLQ) was founded on October 20, 1869. They celebrated the 150th anniversary of the Grand Lodge of Quebec in July 2019.

The GLQ recognizes its own members, as well as members from other jurisdictions with the A.J.B. Melbourne medal.

== See also ==
- List of Masonic Grand Lodges in Canada
