= Erasmus James Philipps =

Canadian politician

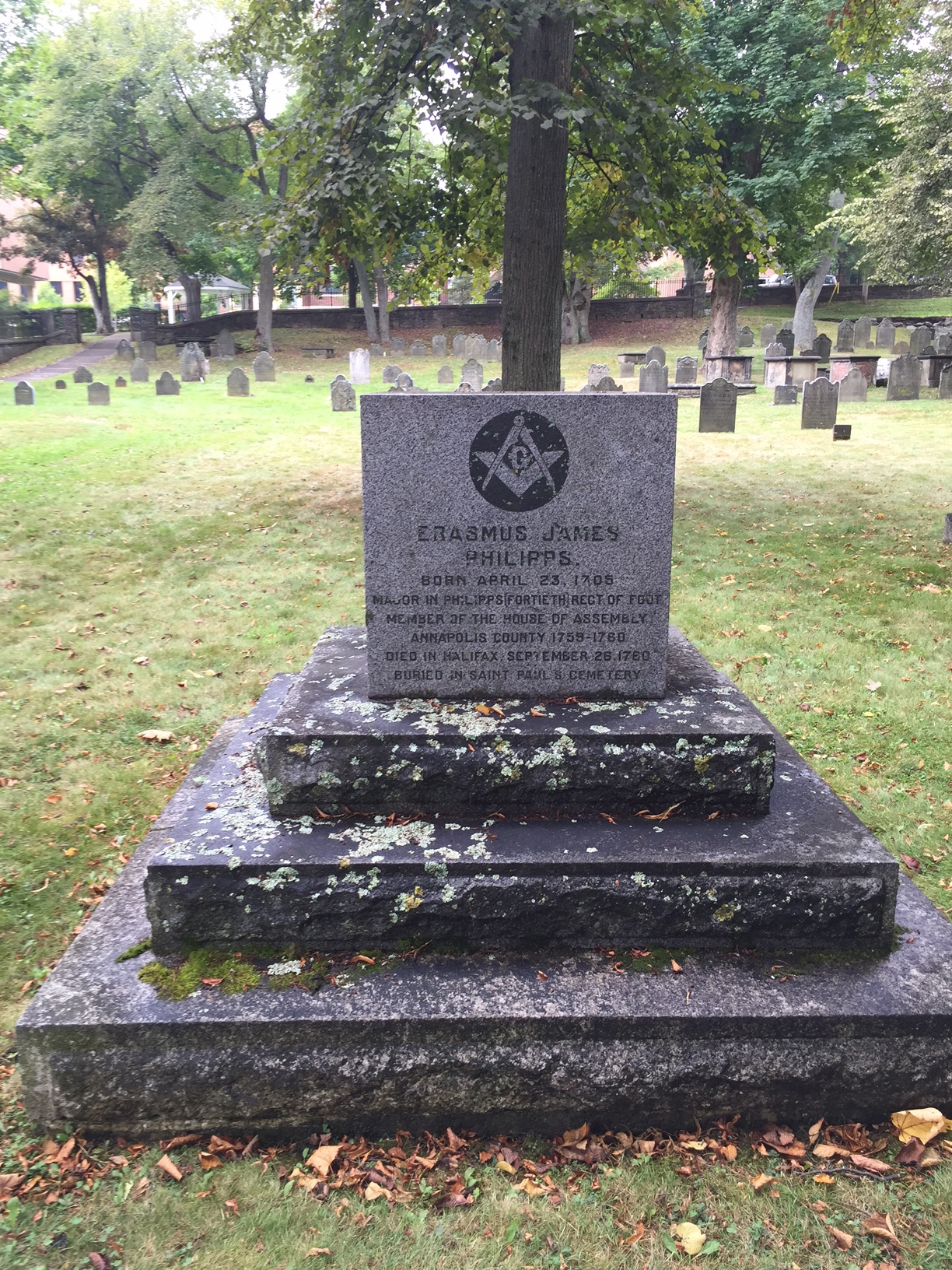
Erasmus James Philipps Monument (erected 1938), Old Burying Ground (Halifax, Nova Scotia)

Erasmus James Philipps (23 April 1705 – 26 September 1760) was the second longest serving member on Nova Scotia Council (1730–1760) and the nephew of Nova Scotia Governor Richard Philipps. He was also a captain in the 40th Regiment of Foot. He was a member of the Nova Scotia House of Assembly from 1759 to 1760. On the retirement of Lt. Gov. Paul Mascarene, Major Philipps became commander of the forces at Annapolis Royal, Nova Scotia (1749–1760). He arranged the Cape Sable Campaign during the French and Indian War. He is the earliest known settler of Nova Scotia (c. 1721) who was buried in the Old Burying Ground (Halifax, Nova Scotia).

== Career ==
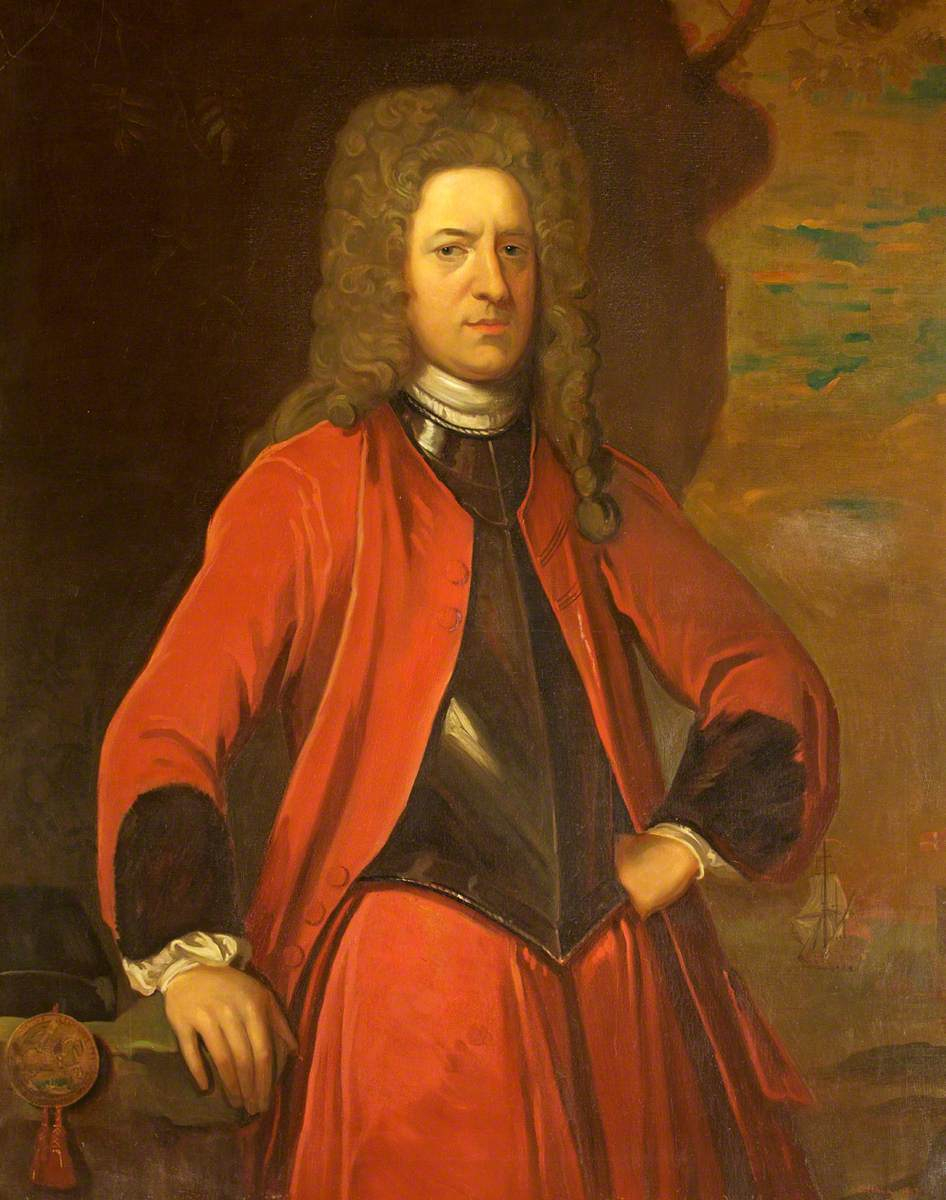
Erasmus' uncle Gov. Richard Philipps

Philipps was born in London. He was well educated and able to speak fluent French. He entered the army at age 16. He was stationed at Annapolis with the 40th Regiment, serving under Armstrong who was standing in for his uncle. Erasmus wrote rare letters to the Governor while he was in England that are still preserved. He was involved in collecting the oath of allegiance from the Acadians, which they refused in 1727. He was an ensign in the 40th Regiment of Foot stationed in Nova Scotia. In the spring of 1727, he went to Beaubassin under order from lieutenant governor Lawrence Armstrong to administer an oath of loyalty to Britain to the Acadians there; the Acadians refused to comply. In 1730, Philipps was named to Nova Scotia Council.

He was then posted to Canso with the 40th Regiment (1728). He was appointed to be Advocate for the Vice Admiralty Court in Nova Scotia (1729–1749). He became the secretary for the Nova Scotia Council (1731–1760). He was asked by the Board of Trade to assist in settling boundary disputes between Massachusetts Bay and New Hampshire as well as Massachusetts Bay and Rhode Island. He became a Freemason while working on a commission to resolve boundaries in New England and, in 1739, became provincial grand master for Nova Scotia; Philipps founded the first Masonic lodge in Canada at Annapolis Royal.

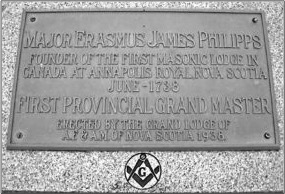
Erasmus James Philipps plaque, Annapolis Royal, Nova Scotia

During King George's War, Philipps looked after providing accommodation and supplies for the troops during the Battle of Grand Pré (1747). He survived the French attack and returned to Annapolis Royal. When the provincial legislature was reorganized in 1749, Philipps was named to the new Council.

He arranged the Cape Sable Campaign during the French and Indian War. He was elected to the provincial assembly in 1759 but died in office of apoplexy in Halifax the following year at the age of 55.

== Legacy ==
- namesake of the Grand Lodge of Nova Scotia's medallion (1921).

== See also ==
- Freemasonry in Canada
- Freemasonry
