= New Harbor, Maine =

- Village
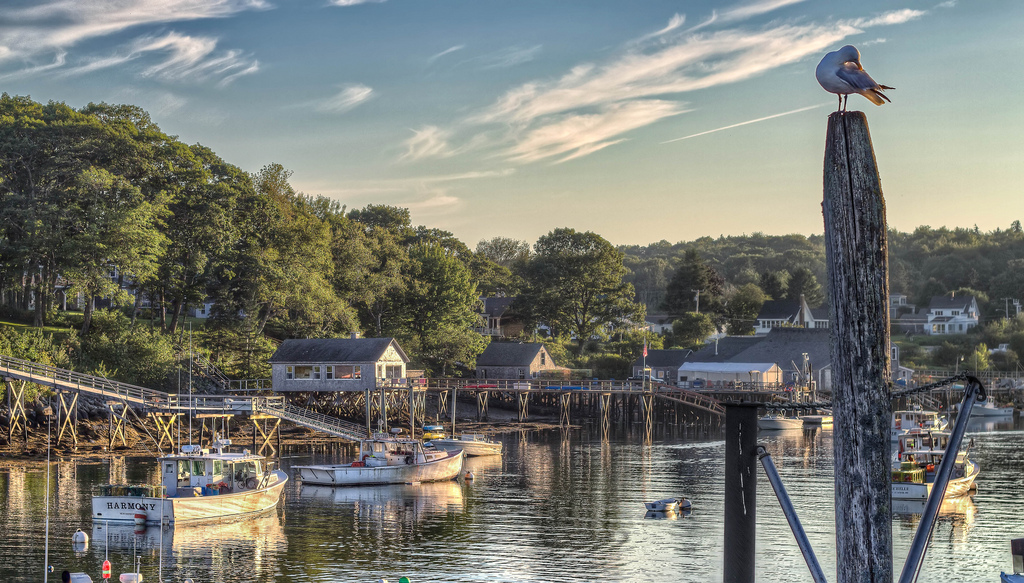
- View from Shaws Wharf

- Location within Maine Location within the United States
- Coordinates: 43°52′33″N 69°29′24″W
- Country: United States
- State: Maine
- County: Lincoln
- Town: Bristol
- Elevation: 40 ft (12 m)
- Time zone: UTC-5 (Eastern (EST))
  - Summer (DST): UTC-4 (EDT)
- ZIP code: 04554
- Area code: 207
- GNIS feature ID: 572116
- Website: www.newharbormaine.org

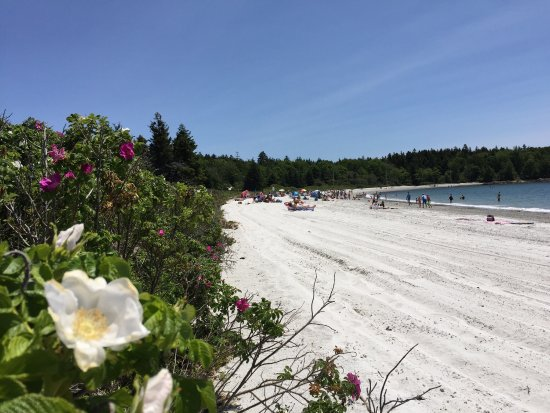
Pemaquid Beach

New Harbor is a small scenic coastal village in the town of Bristol, in Lincoln County, Maine, United States. In 2019, the town of Bristol, and in turn New Harbor, was a finalist in the Reader's Digest award for "America's Nicest Place." Bristol and New Harbor were also nominated for and won the "Nicest Place in Maine Award" by Reader's Digest. New Harbor has historical sites such as the Pemaquid Point Lighthouse and Fort William Henry. New Harbor is the site of Pemaquid Beach, on Johns Bay.

== History ==
=== Colonial Pemaquid ===
One of its most notable historic sites is Colonial Pemaquid, which has a long history dating back to Native Americans who lived in the area at least seven thousand years ago. Colonial Pemaquid later became the site of an early English outpost and fishing station.

Today, Colonial Pemaquid is a State Historic Site owned and managed by the Bureau of Parks and Public Lands, part of the Maine Department of Agriculture, Conservation, and Forestry. The Friends of Colonial Pemaquid, a non-profit organization, assists the state in caring for and interpreting the site.

Visitors to Colonial Pemaquid can explore several points of interest, including Fort William Henry, a replica of the 1692 fort built on the same site. The fort features interpretive panels and artifact exhibits, as well as a panoramic view of the area from the roof. The Fort House, a restored Federal-style home dating back to 1790, contains a research library, archaeology lab, interpretive information, and artifact storage from the many archaeological digs conducted at Pemaquid.

The village area displays stone building foundations, which reveal the locations and sizes of structures from various periods of the village's history. The burial ground dates back to the early 1700s, and it is believed to be the site of burials for settlers dating back to the original British arrival in the 1620s.

The museum at Colonial Pemaquid houses exhibits on the history of the area, from ancient Native American life to the colonial period, including a large diorama of the Pemaquid village. The site also commemorates the wreck of the Angel Gabriel, a galleon destroyed by a hurricane while anchored at Pemaquid in 1635. A bronze plaque dedicated by descendants of the survivors marks the event.

Colonial Pemaquid also includes a gift shop operated by the Friends of Colonial Pemaquid, offering history-related items for visitors. The shop is located in the Fort House.

The town's history is also documented in an account by Waterman Hatch, who worked for Capt. John Nichols in the Partridge House in 1825 and 1826. Hatch's account, transcribed by Dr. Peregrine Wroth, details the remnants of cellars, streets, and other structures throughout the peninsula. Hatch's recollections provide insight into the early settlement's layout, including the locations of blacksmith forges, paved streets, and burial sites.

=== Beach history ===
Pemaquid Beach, is a public family beach in New Harbor, Maine. The Beach is owned by the Town of Bristol in mid-coast Maine and, along with its "sister" park- the Pemaquid Point Lighthouse, are operated by the Bristol Parks Commission.

In 1958 there was a special town meeting held where voters of New Harbor approved a large purchase of what was once called "Big Beach." This town purchase officially made the beach public, allowing all residents to visit any time of the year even when closed in the off-season.

== Notable people ==
- Benjamin Bates IV
- Slaid Cleaves
- Thomas Drummond (judge)
- John Gyles
- Marcus Hanna, lighthouse keeper
- Robert Livingston Ireland Jr.
- Cabot Lyford, sculptor
- William North
- Elizabeth Upham Yates

== Representations in media ==
The village's lobster fishermen and "Back Cove" were featured on an episode of the Discovery Channel's Sunrise Earth. The community was also used as a filming location for the 1999 film Message in a Bottle, with some scenes filmed at Shaw's Wharf. In 1922 the silent film The Seventh Day, starring Richard Barthelmess, was filmed in New Harbor.

Hiking and nature preserves include the Rachel Carson Salt Pond Preserve in New Harbor. The Salt Pond Preserve was one of Carson's favorite spots, and inspired some of the research for her book, The Edge of the Sea.

== Gallery ==
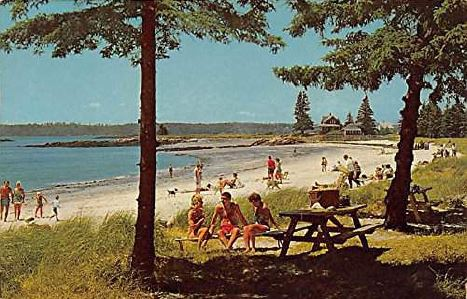
A photo of Pemaquid Beach from the 60's or 70's, shortly after the public purchase from the town.

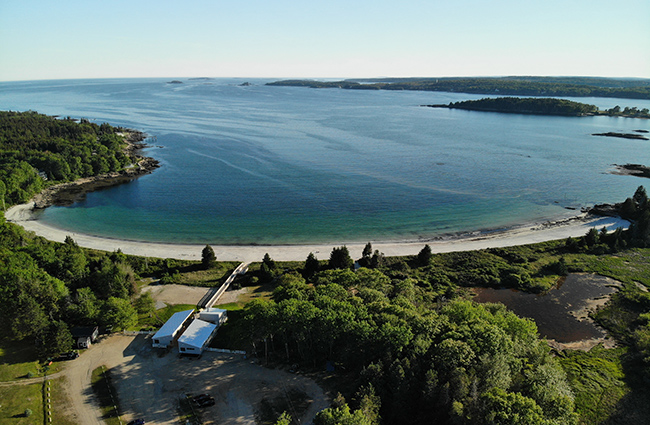
The new Pemaquid Beach Pavilion at Pemaquid Beach overlooking Johns Bay.
