= Thompson Icehouse =

- U.S. National Register of Historic Places
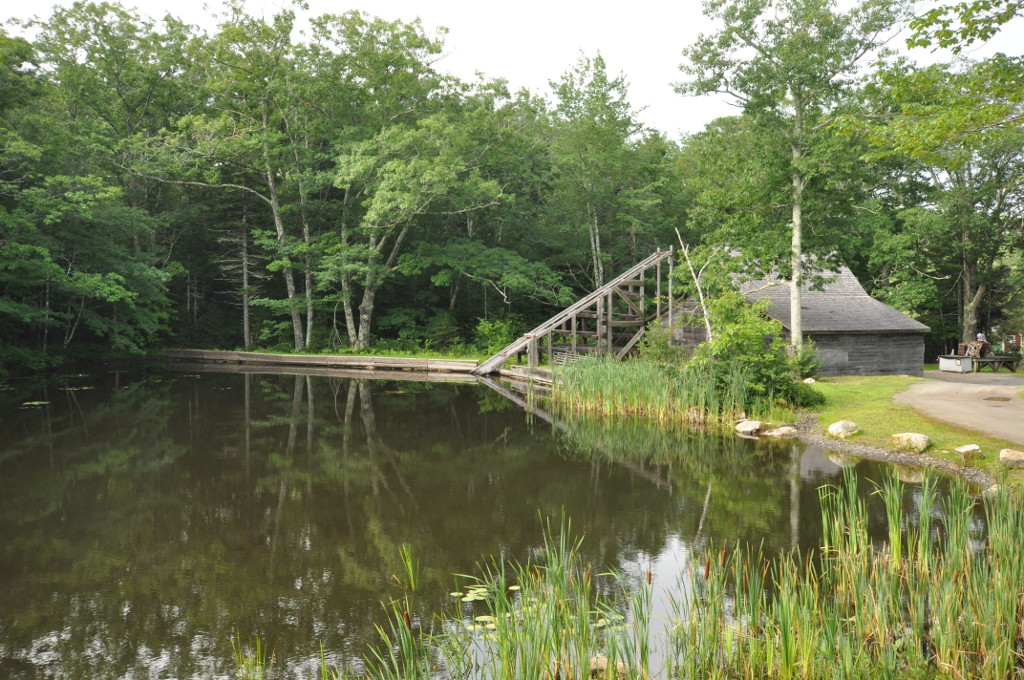

- Location within Maine
- Location: ME 129, South Bristol, Maine
- Coordinates: 43°52′44″N 69°33′38″W
- Area: 3 acres (1.2 ha)
- Built: 1826
- NRHP reference No.: 74000179
- Added to NRHP: December 31, 1974

The Thomson Icehouse is a historic ice harvesting facility on Maine State Route 129 in South Bristol, Maine. The site has been used for ice harvesting since 1826, and is now a museum, annually using traditional means to harvest and store ice from adjacent Thompson Pond. The property was listed on the National Register of Historic Places in 1974. It is believed to be the only active ice harvesting operation in the state.

== Description and history ==
The Thompson Ice House stands on the east side of SR 129, just south of its junction with McFarlands Cove Road. It is set between the road and Thompsons Pond, a 3-acre (1.2 ha) freshwater pond. The ice house is a single-story wood frame structure, with a gabled main section flanked on its long sides by shed-roof ells. Its exterior walls are unpainted horizontal pine boards, and its interior walls are separated from the outside by a nine-inch gap filled with sawdust for insulation. Large doors on the east and west sides facilitate the movement of large ice cakes into and out of the building. The east (pond-facing) side has a channel which could be used to float the ice cakes into the building and onto conveyors that would move it into the storage area that occupies most of the building.

Although the construction date of the present building is unknown, ice harvesting is known to have been an active business here since 1826, when Asa Thompson began cutting ice from the pond. Ice harvesting was a significant business in Maine during the 19th century, eventually going out of favor with the advent of refrigeration technologies in the 1890s. The business was maintained by successive generations of Thompsons until 1985. In 1987, Herbert Thompson donated the property to a local non-profit, with the proviso that it continue to be operated in the traditional manner as a museum property.

== See also ==
- National Register of Historic Places listings in Lincoln County, Maine
