= Maine State Route 130 =

State highway in Lincoln County, Maine, US

State Route 130

Route information
- Maintained by MaineDOT
- Length: 14.41 mi (23.19 km)
- Existed: 1925–present

Major junctions
- South end: Pemaquid Loop Road in Warren
- SR 129 in Bristol
- North end: US 1 Bus. / SR 129 in Damariscotta

Location
- Country: United States
- State: Maine
- Counties: Lincoln

Highway system
- Maine State Highway System; Interstate; US; State; Auto trails; Lettered highways
← SR 129	→ SR 131

State Route 130 (SR 130) is part of Maine's system of numbered state highways, located in southern Lincoln. It is one of several routes which dead-end on the Atlantic coast at their southern ends. The southern terminus of SR 130 is at Pemaquid Point in Bristol, at the intersection of Bristol Road and Pemaquid Loop Road. The northern terminus is located at U.S. Route 1 Business (US 1 Bus.) in Damariscotta, an end it shares with SR 129. It runs for 14.41 miles (23.19 km).

== Route description ==
SR 130 begins at the intersection of Bristol Road (which carries the initial stretch of SR 130) and Pemaquid Loop Road, which allows one traveling southbound on SR 130 to loop around and head back northbound on the highway without having to turn around; however this loop is not actually designated as part of the route. From this intersection, SR 130 heads north through Bristol, meeting the southern terminus of SR 32 along the way. In the northwestern tip of town, SR 130 intersects SR 129, another "dead-end" route which runs to Christmas Cove at the tip of South Bristol. SR 129 and SR 130 are cosigned into Damariscotta where the highway intersects with US 1 Business. Both routes terminate at this intersection.

== History ==
As it was first designated in 1925, the northern terminus of SR 130 was at its intersection with SR 129 in Bristol. In 1975, the route was cosigned with SR 129 to Damariscotta (extending the designation northward three miles) where both routes end today. No major changes have been made in its alignment.

== Major intersections ==
The entire route is in Lincoln County.

Location	mi	km	Destinations	Notes
Bristol	0.0	0.0	Pemaquid Loop Road/Bristol Road (south)	Southern terminus of SR 130
Bristol	2.6	4.2	SR 32 north – Waldoboro, Jefferson	Southern terminus of SR 32
Bristol	11.4	18.3	SR 129 south – South Bristol	Southern terminus of SR 129/130 concurrency
Damariscotta	14.4	23.2	US 1 Bus. (Main Street) to US 1 / SR 215 – Newcastle, Nobleboro SR 129 ends	Northern terminus of SR 129/130
1.000 mi = 1.609 km; 1.000 km = 0.621 mi: Concurrency terminus
