= Pemaquid =

Pemaquid may refer to:

- Pemaquid, Maine, former name of Bristol, Maine, U.S.; today, a village within the town
  - Colonial Pemaquid State Historic Site, a publicly owned historic property here
- Pemaquid Point Light, in Bristol, Maine, U.S.
- Pemaquid River, in the U.S. state of Maine
- Siege of Pemaquid, two 17th-century events in present-day Bristol, Maine, U.S.
