= Two Lights =

Two Lights may refer to:

- Two Lights (album), an album by Five for Fighting or the title song
- Cape Elizabeth Lights, a pair of lighthouse towers south of Portland, Maine also known as "Two Lights"
  - Two Lights State Park, a state park adjacent to the lighthouse
