= USCGC Marcus Hanna =

Keeper-class coastal buoy tender of the United States Coast Guard

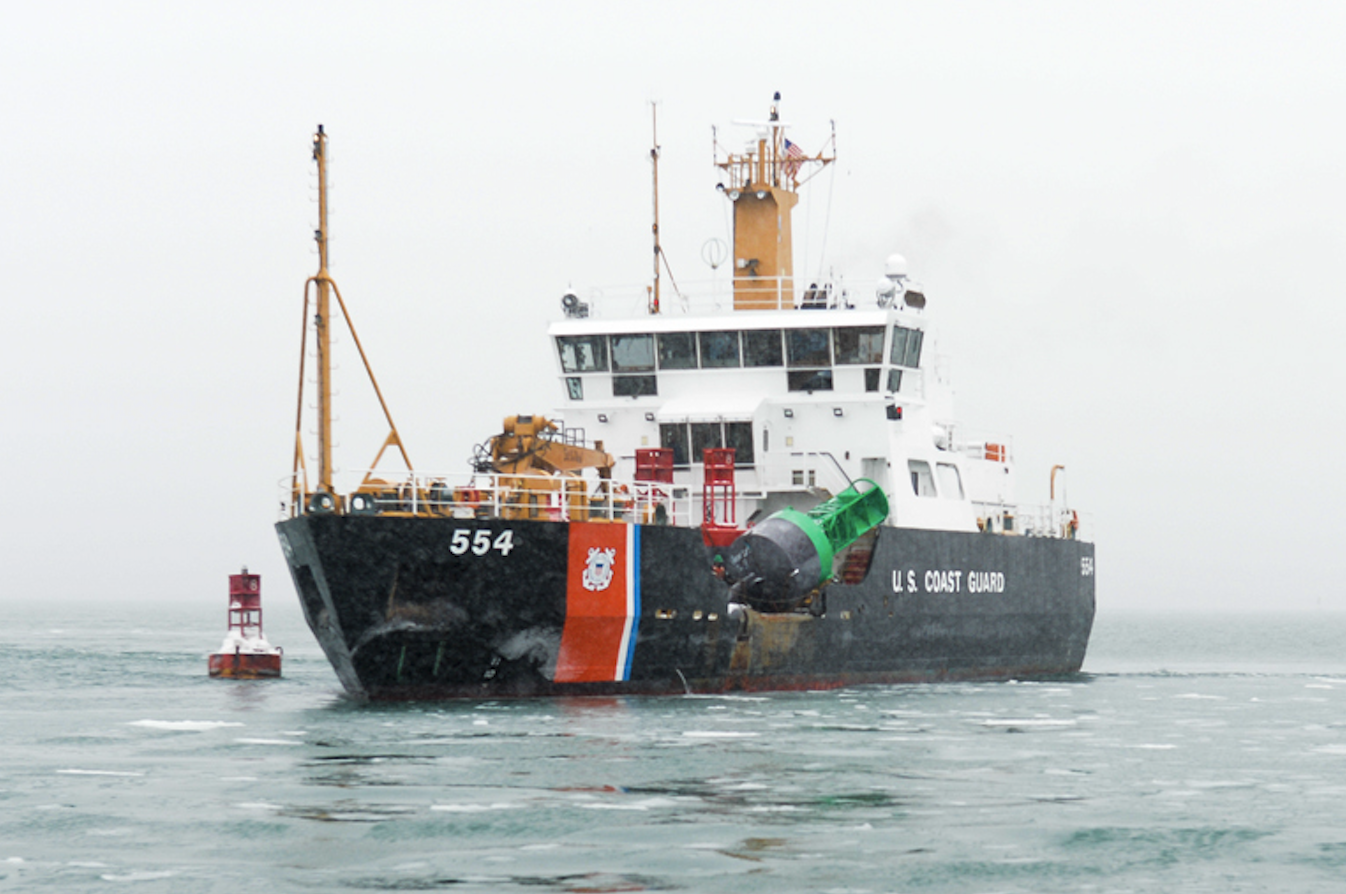
- USCGC Marcus Hanna

History

United States
- Name: Marcus Hanna
- Operator: US Coast Guard
- Builder: Marinette Marine Corporation
- Launched: 23 August 1997
- Commissioned: 9 May 1998
- Home port: South Portland, Maine
- Identification: IMO number: 9155614; Call sign: NMGH; MMSI number: 368905000
- Status: Active

General characteristics
- Type: Keeper-class buoy tender
- Displacement: 850 long tons (864 t) full load
- Length: 175 ft (53.3 m)
- Beam: 36 ft (11.0 m)
- Draft: 8 ft (2.4 m)
- Installed power: 2,000 hp (1,500 kW) sustained
- Propulsion: 2 × Caterpillar 3508 DITA Diesel engines; bow thruster, 500 hp (373 kW)
- Speed: 12 knots (22 km/h; 14 mph)
- Range: 2000 nautical miles at 10 kn
- Crew: 24 (2 Officers, 22 Enlisted)

USCGC Marcus Hanna (WLM-554) is a Keeper-class coastal buoy tender of the United States Coast Guard. Launched in 1997, she is home-ported in South Portland, Maine. Her primary mission is maintaining 376 aids to navigation from Boston to St. John's Bay, Maine. Secondary missions include marine environmental protection, light icebreaking, search and rescue, and security. She is assigned to the First Coast Guard District.

== Construction and characteristics ==
On 22 June 1993 the Coast Guard awarded the contract for the Keeper-class vessels to Marinette Marine Corporation in the form of a firm order for the lead ship and options for thirteen more. The Coast Guard exercised options for three additional ships, including Marcus Hanna on 7 February 1996. The ship was launched on 23 August 1997 into the Menominee River. The keynote speaker at the launch ceremony was Assistant Secretary of the Department of Transportation Melissa J. Spillenkothen. Also in attendance was U.S. Representative Jay Johnson. Marcus Hanna is the fourth of the fourteen Keeper-class ships built.

Her hull was built of welded steel plates. She is 175 feet (53 m) long, with a beam of 36 feet (11 m), and a full-load draft of 8 feet (2.4 m). Marcus Hanna displaces 850 long tons fully loaded. Her gross register tonnage is 904, and her net register tonnage is 271. The top of the mast is 58.75 feet (17.91 m) above the waterline.

Rather than building the ship from the keel up as a single unit, Marinette Marine used a modular fabrication approach. Eight large modules, or "hull blocks" were built separately and then welded together.

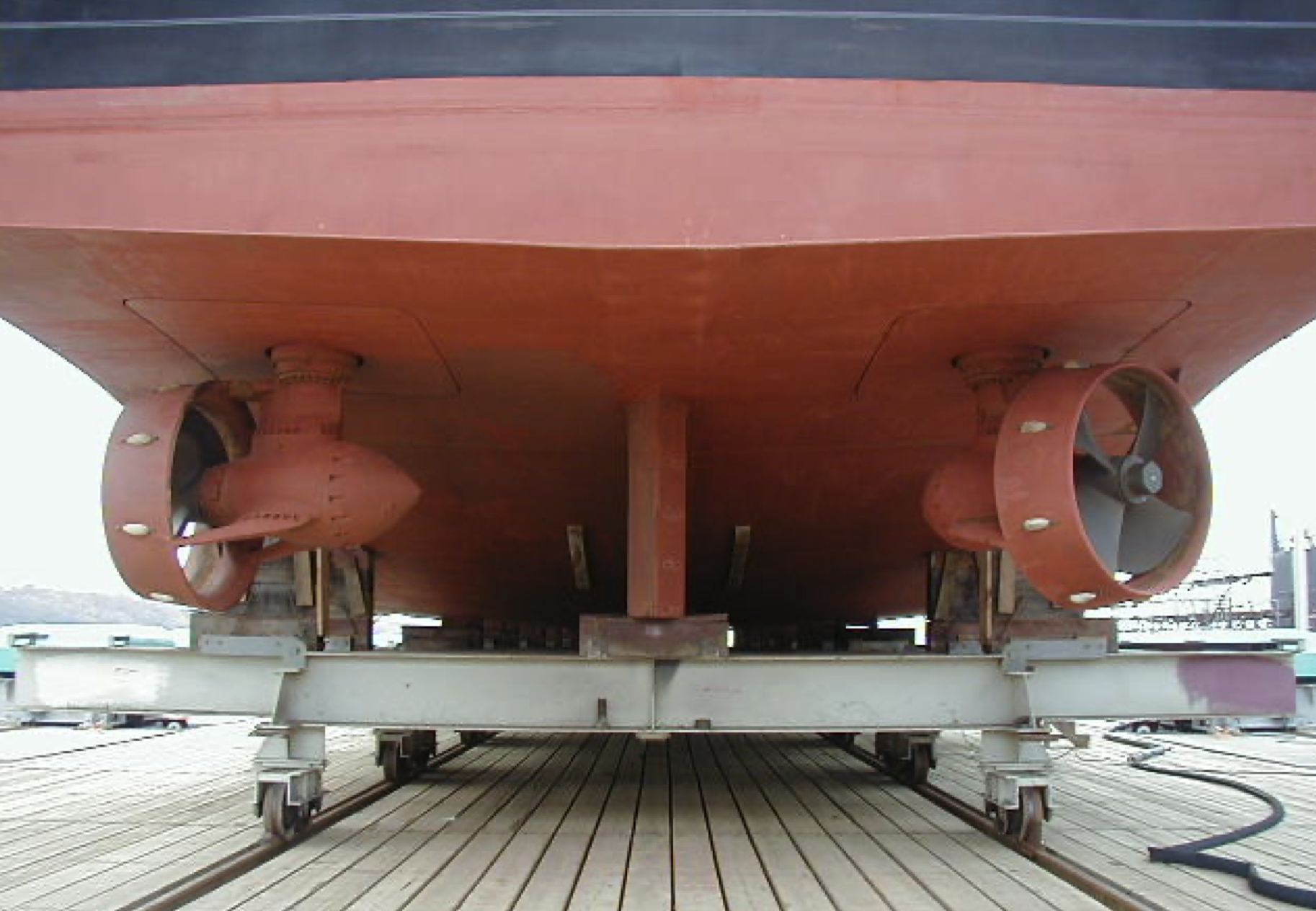
Z-drives on a Keeper-class ship

The ship has two Caterpillar 3508 DITA (direct-injection, turbocharged, aftercooled) 8-cylinder Diesel engines which produce 1000 horsepower each. These drive two Ulstein Z-drives. Keeper-class ships were the first Coast Guard cutters equipped with Z-drives, which markedly improved their maneuverability. The Z-drives have four-bladed propellers which are 57.1 inches (145 cm) in diameter and are equipped with Kort nozzles. They can be operated in "tiller mode" where the Z-drives turn in the same direction to steer the ship, or in "Z-conn mode" where the two Z-drives can turn in different directions to achieve specific maneuvering objectives. An implication of the Z-drives is that there is no reverse gear or rudder aboard Marcus Hanna. In order to back the ship, the Z-drives are turned 180 degrees which drives the ship stern-first even though the propellers are spinning in the same direction as they do when the ship is moving forward. Her maximum speed is 12 knots. Her tanks can hold 16,385 gallons of diesel fuel which gives her an unrefueled range of 2,000 nautical miles at 10 knots.

She has a 500 horsepower bow thruster. The Z-drives and bow thruster can be linked in a Dynamic Positioning System. This gives Marcus Hanna the ability to hold position in the water even in heavy currents, winds, and swells. This advanced capability is useful in bringing buoys aboard that can weigh more than 16,000 lbs.

Electrical power aboard is provided by three Caterpillar 3406 DITA generators which produce 285 Kw each. She also has a 210 Kw emergency generator, which is a Caterpillar 3406 DIT.

The buoy deck has 1,335 square feet (124.0 m^{2}) of working area. A crane with a boom 42 feet (13 m) long lifts buoys and their mooring anchors onto the deck. The crane can lift up to 20,000 pounds (9,100 kg).

The ships' fresh water tanks can hold 7,339 gallons. She has three ballast tanks that can be filled to maintain their trim, and tanks for oily waste water, sewage, gray water, new lubrication oil, and waste oil.

Accommodations were designed for mixed gender crews from the start. Crew size and composition has varied over the years. In 2008 Marcus Hanna had a crew of 24 commanded by a Chief Warrant Officer.

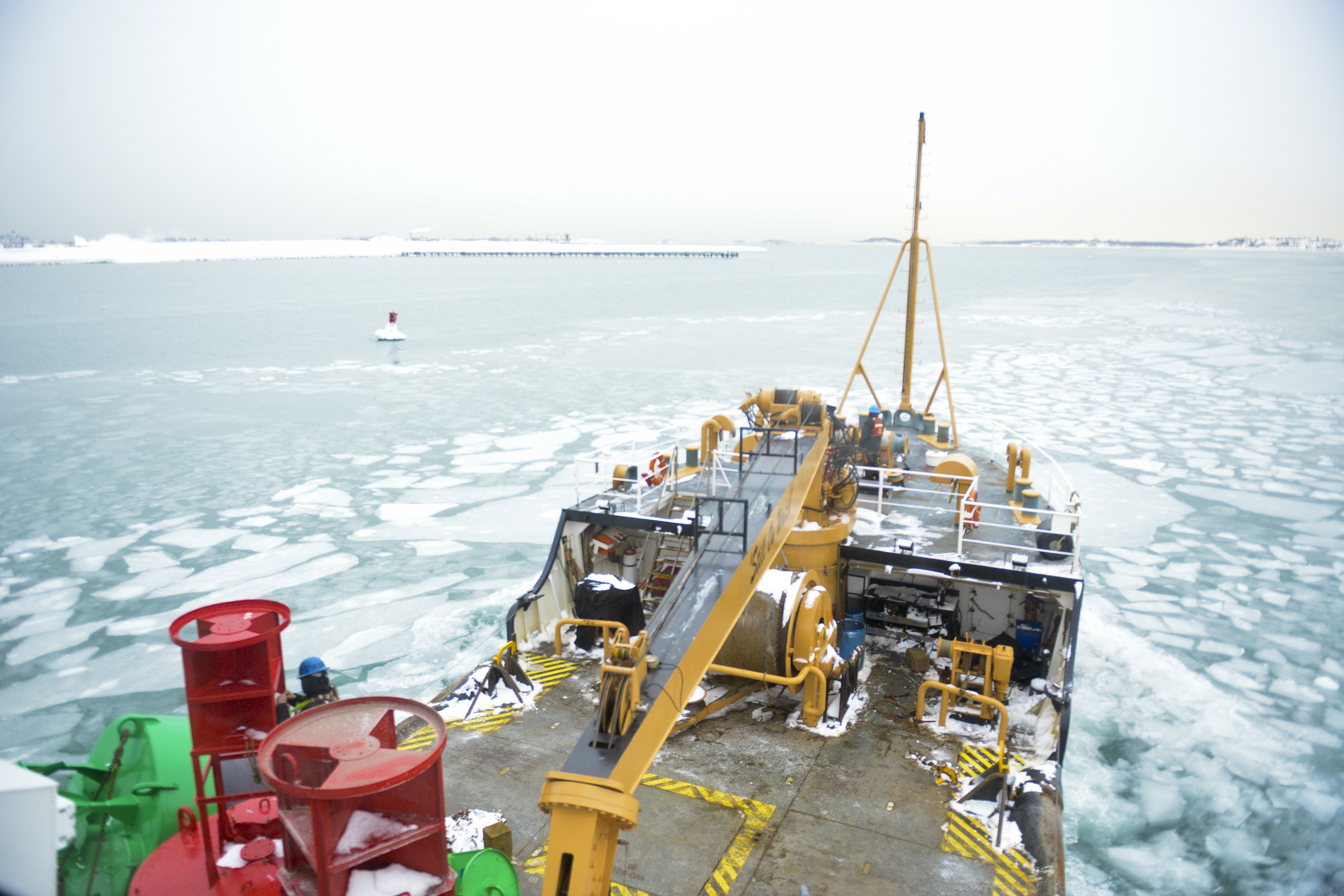
Marcus Hanna breaking ice near Boston

Marcus Hanna, as all Keeper-class ships, has a strengthened "ice belt" along the waterline so that she can work on aids to navigation in ice-infested waters. Not only is the hull plating in the ice belt thicker than the rest of the hull, but framing members are closer together in areas that experience greater loads when working in ice. Higher grades of steel were used for hull plating in the ice belt to prevent cracking in cold temperatures. Her bow is sloped so that rather than smashing into ice, she rides up over it to break it with the weight of the ship. Marcus Hanna is capable of breaking flat, 9-inch thick ice at 3 knots.

The ship carries a cutter boat on davits. She was originally equipped with a CB-M boat which was replaced in the mid-2010s with a CB-ATON-M boat. This was built by Metal Shark Aluminum Boats and was estimated to cost $210,000. The boat is 18 feet (5.5 m) long and are equipped with a Mercury Marine inboard/outboard diesel engine.

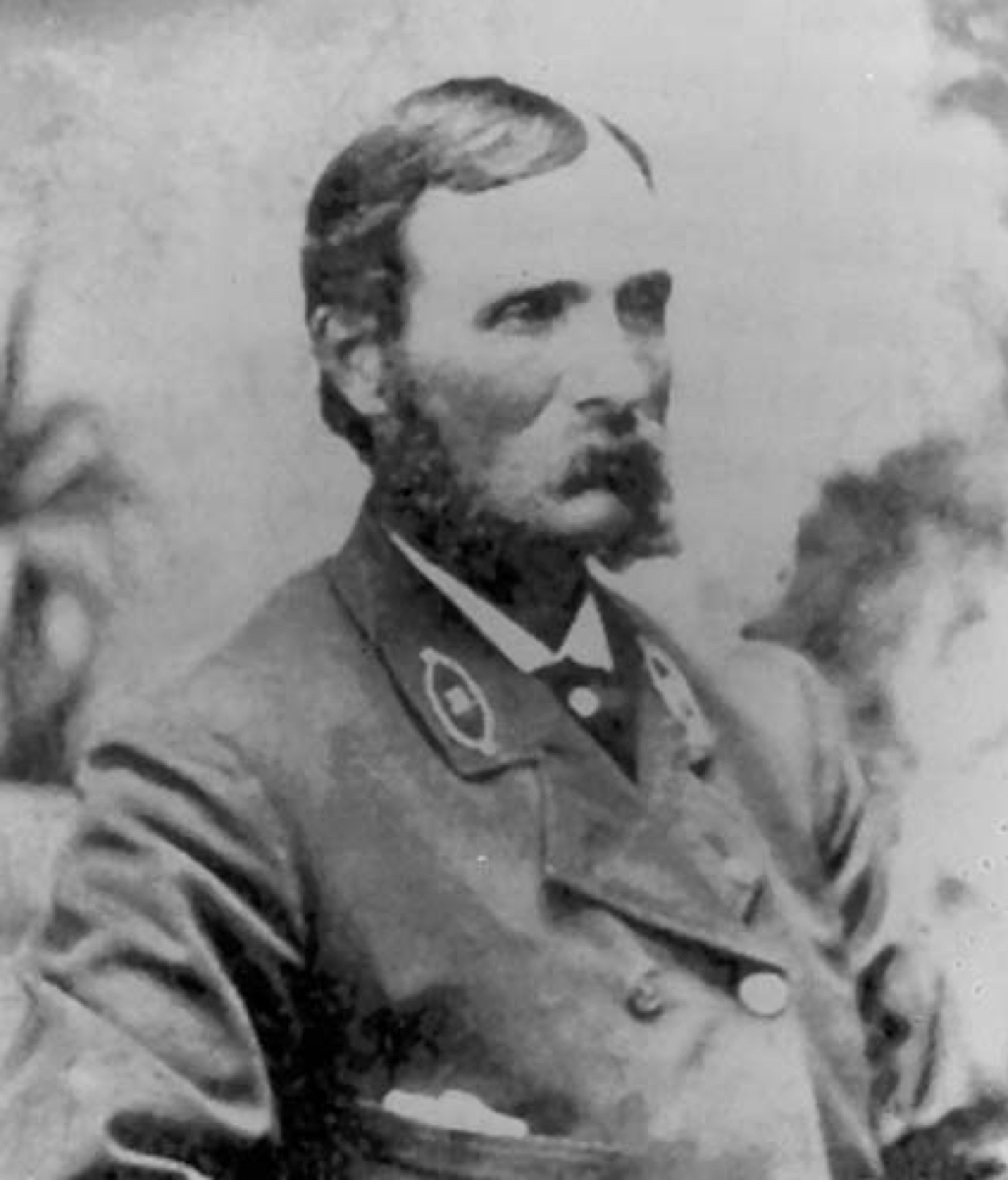
Lighthouse keeper Marcus Hanna

The ship's namesake is lighthouse keeper Marcus Hanna. On 28 January 1885, Hanna was stationed at the Cape Elizabeth Light near Portland, Maine, when the schooner Australia ran up on the rocks nearby in a furious snowstorm. The temperature was 10 degrees below zero, so the spray from the surf immediately froze on everything it touched. The captain of the Australia drowned, but two crewmen climbed up the rigging to escape the cold water. Hanna risked falling into the sea himself as he clambered down the ice-covered rocks to get close enough to throw a line to the two men. He was able to haul them ashore, and though suffering from frostbite, they both survived. Hanna was awarded the gold lifesaving medal on 25 April 1885. This was not his first act of valor. On 4 July 1863, then a Union Army sergeant fighting in the siege of Port Hudson, Louisiana, Hanna ran through Confederate fire to bring water to troops sweltering in their rifle pits. On 2 November 1895, Hanna was awarded the Medal of Honor for his action. He is the only person to have won both medals.

Marcus Hanna replaced USCGC Spar, which was decommissioned in 1997.

== Operational history ==
The ship's crew came on board in October 1997 for training on their new ship. They sailed her from Lake Michigan, through the Great Lakes to reach the Atlantic. On 6 January 1998 Marcus Hanna arrived at her new home port in South Portland. She was commissioned at a ceremony on 9 May 1998.

Marcus Hanna's buoy tending involves lifting them onto her deck where marine growth is scraped and pressure washed off, inspecting the buoy itself, and replacing lights, solar cells, and radar transponders. The mooring chain or synthetic cable is inspected and replaced as needed. The concrete block mooring anchor is also inspected. The coast of northern New England is prone to difficult weather that requires extra maintenance of the buoys that are assigned to Marcus Hanna. For example, a Nor'easter in April 2007 moved 16 buoys up to 400 feet (120 m) from their charted positions. These had to be reset. Two more buoys parted their mooring lines during the storm and drifted away. One washed ashore and the other, a NOAA weather buoy, was captured and taken ashore for repairs. Cold weather also creates additional maintenance since ice can drag buoys off-station or damage them. Marcus Hanna swaps some large summer buoys for small ice-resistant ones in the fall and then reverses the process in the spring.

The bulk of Marcus Hanna's year is spent at sea tending its buoys, or in port maintaining the ship. She has been asked to perform other missions, as described below.

=== Search and rescue ===
In February 2007, Marcus Hanna was dispatched to search for the fishing vessel Lady Luck, which had triggered a distress signal 12 miles off Cape Elizabeth.

On 26 May 2016 the fishing boat Miss Emily was disabled off of Kennebunkport, Maine. Marcus Hanna towed her to Portland for repairs.

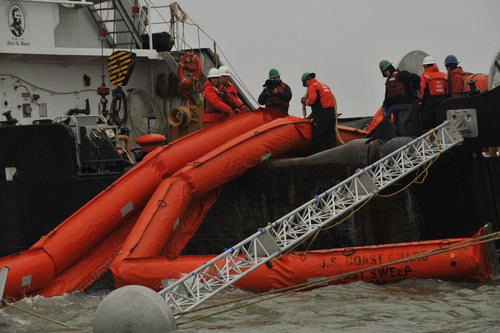
Marcus Hanna deploys the Vessel of Opportunity Skimming System during a 2010 oil spill exercise

=== Marine environmental protection ===
In April 1999 Marcus Hanna discovered a 3-mile long oil slick at the mouth of the Kennebec River and identified a suspect vessel. The Coast Guard issued a verbal warning to the captain of the vessel.

Marcus Hanna drilled with the Vessel of Opportunity Skimming System in March 2010 as part of an oil spill exercise. In June 2013 the ship sailed to St. John, New Brunswick to participate in a joint United States/Canada oil spill recovery training exercise.

=== Security ===
The Coast Guard provides security on the East River in New York City when the United Nations General Assembly meets. Marcus Hanna, and USCGC Katherine Walker, another First District buoy tender, have both exercised in the area.

=== Public engagement ===
The Coast Guard has offered tours aboard Marcus Hanna on several occasions. These include:

Gloucester Maritime Heritage Festival in 1998

Coast Guard Base Portland open house in 1999, 2000

Portland Harborfest in 2005
