= Elizabeth Yates =

Elizabeth Yates may refer to:

- Elizabeth Yates (actress) (1799–1860), English actress
- Elizabeth Yates (writer) (1905–2001), American author
- Elizabeth Yates (mayor) (1845–1918), first female mayor of the British Empire, in Onehunga, New Zealand
- Elizabeth Upham Yates (1857–1942), American suffragist and missionary in China

== See also ==
- Elizabeth Yeats (1868–1940), Anglo-Irish educator and publisher, daughter of J.B. Yeats
