= Fort William Henry (Maine) =

- U.S. National Register of Historic Places
- U.S. National Historic Landmark District – Contributing property
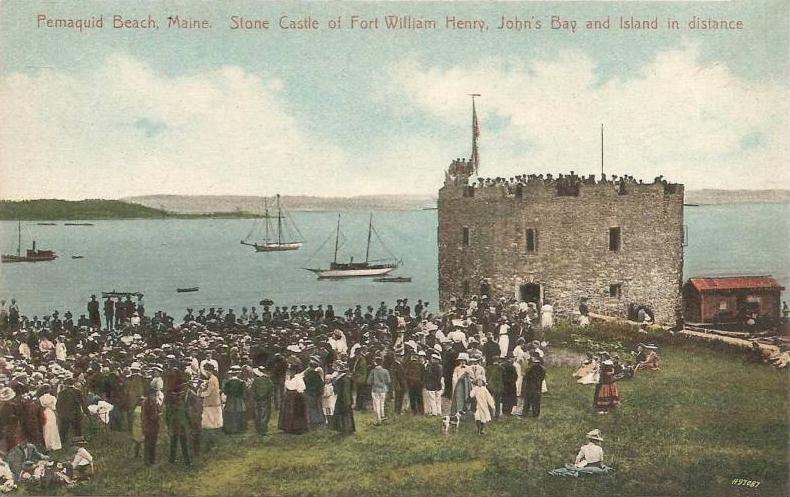
- Replica of Fort William Henry in 1909

- Location within Maine Location within the United States
- Nearest city: New Harbor, Maine
- Coordinates: 43°52′39″N 69°31′29″W
- Area: 1 acre (0.40 ha)
- Built: 1692
- Part of: Pemaquid Archeological Site (ID69000022)
- NRHP reference No.: 69000021

Significant dates
- Added to NRHP: December 1, 1969
- Designated NHLDCP: April 12, 1993

View of Fort William Henry overlooking Pemaquid Harbor (July 2026)

Fort William Henry is located in the village of New Harbor in the town of Bristol, Maine. The fort was, in its time, the largest in New England. The fort was originally built in 1692 but destroyed four years later by New France in the Siege of Pemaquid (1696). A reconstruction was built in 1908. The fort was added to the National Register of Historic Places on December 1, 1969. Fort William Henry is now operated as a museum about the fort's history.

Fort William Henry is part of the Colonial Pemaquid State Historic Site, which also includes the archaeological excavations of 17th and 18th century village buildings and a museum with excavated artifacts found on the site, including musket balls, coins, pottery and early hardware.

== History ==
The first fort on this site was Abraham Shurte's Fort (1630–1633), a palisaded trading post that was burned down by pirates under Dixie Bull. The next fort on the site was Fort Pemaquid (1633–1676), which was destroyed in the Northwest Coast Campaign (1676) during King Philip's War.

== Fort Charles ==
After the Northeast Coast Campaign (1677) during King Philips War, another fort was established with the Treaty of Casco (1678), this third fort was named Fort Charles (1677–1689). Captain Anthony Brockholst (Brockholes) was left in command of Pemaquid in March 1689. Fort Charles was captured early in King William's War. The Penobscot attacked John Gyles and his family near the fort and took him captive before burning the fort in August 1689. Gyles published his experience years later and described the destruction of the fort:

The Fort was surrendered, and Capt Weems went off and soon after the Indians set on fire the fort & houses which made a terrible blast, and was a melancholy sight to us poor captives who were sad spectators.

The English regained their authority over the region by building Fort William Henry.

== Fort William Henry ==
The English built Fort William Henry in 1692 during King William's War to defend New England's northern boundary against the French and Wabanaki Confederacy of Acadia. (Present-day Castine, Maine was an Acadian settlement, which marked the effective southern boundary of Acadia.) The Massachusetts government used one third of its budget to build the fort.

Construction of the fort was ordered by Massachusetts Governor Sir William Phips and cost £20,000 to build. The English colonial militia leader Benjamin Church assisted in the construction. The fort was built with walls that were 10 to 22 feet in height and a stone bastion which was 29 feet in height. The fort was armed with 20 cannon and a garrison of 60 soldiers.

The fort was attacked by a combined force of French and Native Americans in the Siege of Pemaquid (1696). The English were forced to surrender the fort and abandon the Pemaquid area. Benjamin Church avenged the destruction of the fort with the Raid on Chignecto (1696) against Acadia.

== Fort Frederick ==
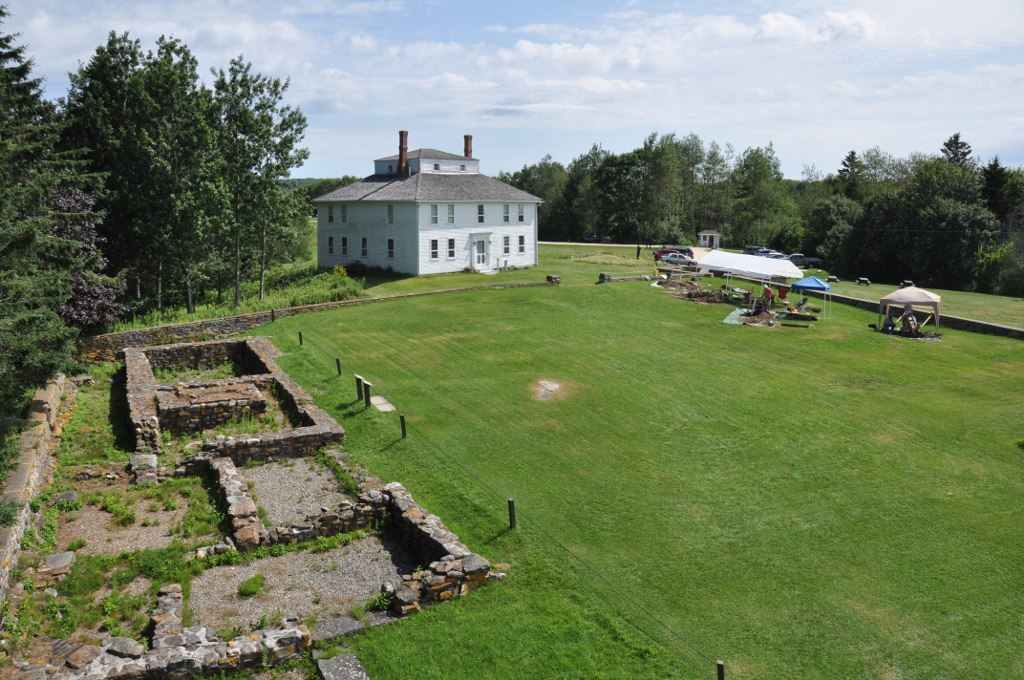
View of Fort House and foundation remnants of Fort Frederick

After Father Rale's War, Colonel David Dunbar, Surveyor-General of the King's Woods, rebuilt the fort in 1729–1730, renaming it Fort Frederick.

During King George's War, Fort Frederick was attacked during the Northeast Coast Campaign (1745) by bands of Penobscot and Norridgewock. They took captive a woman, which alarmed the garrison but she escaped. The fort withstood two attacks in 1747.

During the French and Indian War, the fort was decommissioned in 1759 after a new Fort Frederick was built on the Saint John River the previous year.

In 1775, the town dismantled the fort to prevent it from becoming a British stronghold during the Revolutionary War.

During the War of 1812, the waters off Pemaquid Point saw the capture of HMS Boxer by the USS Enterprise on September 5, 1813. The fort was occupied by the British twice during the war.

The state acquired the site in 1902, and in 1908 rebuilt the tower of Fort William Henry under guidance of historian John Henry Cartland, using many original stones. In 1969, the fort was listed on the National Register of Historic Places. The entire state historic site (including the fort and other surrounding colonial archaeological remains) was designated the "Pemaquid Archeological Site" National Historic Landmark District in 1993.

== See also ==
- National Register of Historic Places listings in Lincoln County, Maine
