= Siege of Pemaquid =

Siege of Pemaquid refers to two 17th-century events at Pemaquid, Maine:

- Siege of Pemaquid (1689), capture and destruction of an English fort by a large band of Abenaki indigenous people during King William's War
- Siege of Pemaquid (1696), capture and destruction of a new English fort by a French-Native force during King William's War

== See also ==
- Pemaquid (disambiguation)
