= Cabot Lyford =

American sculptor

Cabot Lyford (May 22, 1925 – January 21, 2016) was an American sculptor best known for his depictions of animals and the female figure, often using black granite and wood as materials. His sculptures are located within public parks, museums and schools throughout Maine and the United States. Some of Lyford's best known pieces includes "My Mother the Wind," which was placed on the waterfront in Portsmouth, New Hampshire, in 1975, and "Life Force," a seven-ton dolphin sculpture created from Deer Isle granite, which stands outside the Regency Hotel in Portland, Maine. Examples of his work are housed within the permanent collections of the Portland Museum of Art, the Colby College Museum of Art, the Farnsworth Art Museum, and the Ogunquit Museum of American Art in Maine.

== Biography ==
=== Early life and career ===
Lyford was born in 1925 in Sayre, Pennsylvania, to Frederic Eugene and Eleanor (née Cabot) Lyford. He was raised in the nearby village of Waverly, New York before moving with his parents to Upper Darby Township, Pennsylvania, and then Scarsdale, New York. He graduated from Scarsdale High School in 1942. He enrolled in Cornell University for architecture after high school, but left early to enlist in the United States military during World War II. He served in combat as a rifleman, runner and scout, with the 96th Infantry Division during the Battle of Leyte in the Philippines. He was transferred to the Army Signal Corps in early 1945 and stationed in Cebu City for the remainder of World War II.

He re-enrolled at Cornell University in January 1946 with the aid of the G.I. Bill, switched majors, and received a Master of Fine Arts in 1950. Prior to graduating from Cornell, Lyford completed the Skowhegan School of Painting and Sculpture summer artists residency in 1947, which marked his first serious artistic endeavour. Lyford relocated to New York City after graduating from Cornell, where he wrote, directed and produced television commercials for NBC and J. Walter Thompson, an advertising agency. He married his wife, Joan Richmond, in 1957. They relocated to Cambridge, Massachusetts, in 1957, where Lyford was hired to create educational television programming at WGBH-TV, Boston's PBS affiliate. He also helped to launch WENH-TV in Durham, New Hampshire (now New Hampshire Public Television).

=== Art and sculpture ===
Lyford transitioned from television back to the arts in 1963, when he was hired as an art history and sculpture teacher by Phillips Exeter Academy, a selective private school, and moved to Exeter, New Hampshire. He eventually became the head of the academy's art department and director for the Lamont Gallery during his 23-year tenure at Phillips Exeter. During this time, he established his art studio, first in a garage in Durham, New Hampshire, and then in an old chicken coop. This allowed him to begin his focus on large sculptures, often crafted from black granite, but also marble and wood as well. One of his first major large sculptures was a wooden sculpture of geese, which was installed at the Mount Sunapee Resort in New Hampshire. Lyford retired from Phillips Exeter Academy in 1986 after a 23-year teaching career as the school. He and his wife then moved to their summer home in Pemaquid, Maine, on Pemaquid Harbor, which the couple had originally purchased for $7,000.

Lyford maintained art studios in both New Hampshire and New Harbor, Maine. Four of his large, public sculptures can be found in Portsmouth, New Hampshire. "The Whale", which now stands in Prescott Park, was carved from a massive block of black granite from Australia, which had originally been imported during the construction of a large Portsmouth high rise. Lyford had purchased the leftover Australian granite to create "The Whale", as well as another landmark Portsmouth monument, "My Mother the Wind", which was installed on Four Tree Island on the city's waterfront in 1975, facing the Portsmouth Naval Shipyard. "My Mother the Wind", now a city landmark, is composed of seven tons of Australian black granite. According to his son, Matt Lyford, "My Mother the Wind" is an anti-war sculpture which shows a mother and child escaping a battle.

In Maine, one of Lyford's best known sculptures is "Life Force", which stands outside the Regency Hotel in Portland. The sculpture, which was created from seven tons of black granite from Deer Isle, Maine, shows three dolphins leaping from the water.

"Remember", a black granite sculpture of a goose, stands in the peony garden at the headquarters of Maine Audubon in Falmouth, Maine. Lyford created "Remember" in the aftermath of the 1989 Exxon Valdez oil spill. He chose black granite because the color recalls a seabird covered in oil. He originally called the sculpture "Thanks, Exxon", but changed the name to encourage people to remember the costs of environmental, manmade calamities.

Elsewhere in Maine, his sculptures can be found within the terminal at the Portland International Jetport. A large sculpture of a mother seal and her pup stands outside the main entrance of the Vivian E. Hussey Elementary School in Berwick, Maine. His pieces have also been installed at museums in neighboring states, including the USS Albacore museum in Portsmouth, New Hampshire, and the New Bedford Whaling Museum in New Bedford, Massachusetts.

Lyford was a resident of New Harbor, Maine, where he kept his studio for many years. He suffered from arthritis, which prevented him from sculpting during his later life. In 2014, Lyford was the subject of an episode of the Maine Masters called "Cabot Lyford: Portrait of a Man as Artist", by filmmaker Dale Schierholt. The Maine Masters film series profiles Maine artists who have made major artistic contributions to the state.

Cabot Lyford died from complications of a heart attack, as well as other illnesses, at Bodwell Hospice of the Midcoast Senior Health Center in Brunswick, Maine, on January 21, 2016, at the age of 90. His wife, Joan Lyford, whom he married in 1953, died in 2014. He was survived by three children, Matthew Lyford, Julia Lane and Thaddeus Lyford.
