= Chamberlain, Maine =

- Village
- Location within Maine Location within the United States
- Coordinates: 43°53′31″N 69°28′38″W
- Country: United States
- State: Maine
- County: Lincoln
- Town: Bristol
- Elevation: 13 ft (4.0 m)
- Time zone: UTC−5 (Eastern (EST))
  - Summer (DST): UTC−4 (EDT)
- ZIP Code: 04541
- Area code: 207
- GNIS feature ID: 563799

Chamberlain is an unincorporated village in the town of Bristol, Lincoln County, Maine, United States. The community is located along Maine State Route 32, 12.1 miles (19.5 km) southeast of Wiscasset. Chamberlain has a post office, with ZIP Code 04541, which opened on September 30, 1905.

== Notable people ==
- Albinas Elskus, Lithuanian-born stained glass artist
