= Louds Island, Maine =

- Unorganized territory
- Location within Maine Location within the United States
- Coordinates: 43°53′37″N 69°24′44″W
- Country: United States
- State: Maine
- County: Lincoln

Area
  - Total: 15.0 sq mi (38.8 km^{2})
  - Land: 1.5 sq mi (4.0 km^{2})
  - Water: 13.4 sq mi (34.7 km^{2})
- Elevation: 0 ft (0 m)

Population (2020)
  - Total: 3
- Time zone: UTC-5 (Eastern (EST))
  - Summer (DST): UTC-4 (EDT)
- ZIP code: 04564 (Round Pond)
- Area code: 207
- FIPS code: 23-41280
- GNIS feature ID: 1954727

Louds Island, also once known as Muscongus Island, is an island in Muscongus Bay off the coast of Round Pond, a village of Bristol, Maine, United States. It is also an unorganized territory of Maine. It is approximately 3 miles (4.8 km) long and 1 mile (1.6 km) wide at its widest point. The island did not have a flush toilet until 2009. The 2020 census lists Louds Island with a population of 3. It is part of the unorganized territory of Lincoln County.

== History ==
According to History of Cumberland Co., Maine, "On the 15th of July, 1625, John Brown, of New Harbor, purchased of Capt. John Somerset and Unongoit, two Indian sachems, for fifty skins, a tract of land on Pemaquid, extending eight miles by twenty-five, together with Muscongus Island.[1] The next year Abraham Shurt was "sent over by Alderman Aldsworth and Giles Elbridge, merchants of Bristol, as their agent, and was invested with power to purchase Mouhegan for them. This island then belonged to Abraham Jennings, of Plymouth, of whose agent Shurt purchased it for fifty pounds." [1]Report of Mass. Com. on the Pemaq. Title, 1811, 107.

According to island chronicler Charles McLane, Louds seceded from the town of Bristol and also the United States in the early 1860s—although there are differing versions of exactly why. McLane says "the secession, in any case, was real enough and Louds has remained townless to the present day and remained stateless until the early 1900s."

Louds Island hosted a "vigorous settlement that peaked in the post-Civil war era," but its year-round community dwindled over the next century. Its school closed in 1962 and the last of the year-round residents departed soon thereafter. Since then Louds has hosted only summer rusticators. As of the 2010 census there were 43 housing units on the island, all for seasonal or vacation use. The Loudville Church, located near the center of the island, is listed on the National Register of Historic Places; it was built in 1913 using lumber from a schoolhouse originally on the forcibly evicted settlement of Malaga Island in Phippsburg.

== Geography ==
According to the United States Census Bureau, the unorganized territory has a total area of 15.0 square miles (38.8 km^{2}), of which 1.6 square miles (4.0 km^{2}) is land and 13.4 square mile (34.7 km^{2}) is water (90%). The island itself is 3 miles (4.8 km) long and 1 mile (1.6 km) wide at its widest point.

Historical population
Census	Pop.	Note	%±
2010	0		—
2020	3		—
U.S. Decennial Census

== Education ==
The Maine Department of Education takes responsibility for coordinating school assignments in the unorganized territory.

== See also ==
- List of islands of Maine
