= Albinas Elskus =

Lithuanian-American educator and artist (1926–2007)

Albin Elskus
- Born: Albinas Elskus; August 21, 1926; Kaunas, Lithuania
- Died: February 8, 2007 (aged 80); Chamberlain, Maine, U.S.
- Education: Arts et Métiers ParisTech; École des Beaux-Arts
- Known for: Stained glass

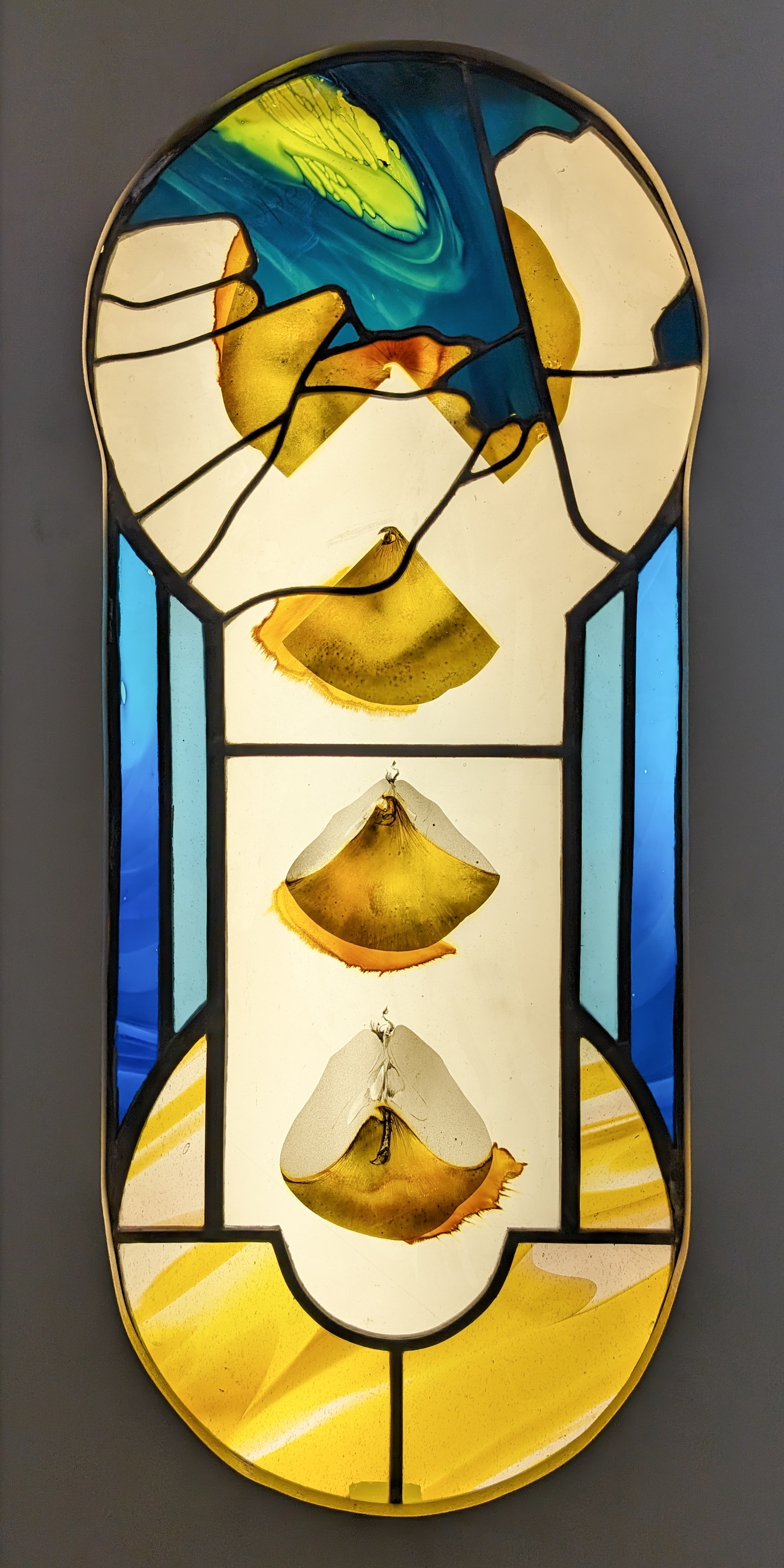
Metamorphosis, 1979

Albinas "Albin" Elskus (1926–2007) was a Lithuanian-American educator and artist, known for creating works of stained glass.

== Early life ==
Elskus was born in Kaunas, Lithuania in 1926. During the Occupation of the Baltic states, Elskus fled to Germany to avoid being conscripted into the Soviet Army. Elskus began studying architecture in Darmstadt and painting at the Arts et Métiers ParisTech.

== Career ==
Elskus immigrated to Chicago, Illinois in 1949 and worked as an apprentice in a stained glass studio. After settling in a predominantly Lithuanian neighborhood, Elskus travelled to Paris to study at the École des Beaux-Arts. Elskus eventually returning to the United States and married Ann (née Crewdson). They settled in New York City, where Elskus continued to create stained glass pieces. Elskus was commissioned to created works for churches in the United States and Europe, including several in Maine.

Elskus taught art courses at the Haystack Mountain School of Crafts in Deer Isle, Maine and Pilchuck Glass School in Stanwood, Washington. He also taught at the Parsons School of Design and Fordham University.

== Personal life ==
Elskus and his wife had three children. He died on February 8, 2007, in Chamberlain, Maine at the age of 80.

== See also ==
- List of Lithuanian painters
