= Maine State Route 129 =

State highway in Lincoln County, Maine, US

State Route 129

Route information
- Maintained by MaineDOT
- Length: 13.36 mi (21.50 km)
- Existed: 1925–present

Major junctions
- South end: Middle Road in South Bristol, Maine
- SR 130 in Bristol
- North end: US 1 Bus. / SR 130 in Damariscotta

Location
- Country: United States
- State: Maine
- Counties: Lincoln

Highway system
- Maine State Highway System; Interstate; US; State; Auto trails; Lettered highways
← SR 128	→ SR 130

State Route 129 (SR 129) is part of Maine's system of numbered state highways, located in southern Lincoln. It is one of several routes which "dead-end" on the Atlantic coast at their southern ends. The southern terminus of SR 129 is at Middle Road in South Bristol, a few miles north of Christmas Cove at the tip of South Bristol. The northern terminus is located at U.S. Route 1 Business (US 1 Bus.) in Damariscotta, an end it shares with SR 130. It runs for 13.36 miles (21.50 km).

== Route description ==
SR 129 begins at Middle Road in South Bristol and heads north towards Bristol, where it connects with SR 130 another "dead-end" route which runs to Pemaquid Point at the southern tip of Bristol. SR 129 and SR 130 are cosigned into Damariscotta where the highway intersects with US 1 Business. Both routes terminate at this intersection.

== History ==
As it was first designated in 1925, SR 129 extended south all the way to the tip of South Bristol at the intersection with Shipley Road. In 2004, the route was truncated to the intersection with Middle Road, which remains its southern terminus. No other major changes have been made to the route, except for the co-signing of SR 130 along its northern segment.

== Major intersections ==
The entire route is in Lincoln County.

Location	mi	km	Destinations	Notes
South Bristol	0.0	0.0	Middle Road	Southern terminus of SR 129
Bristol	10.4	16.7	SR 130 south – Bristol, Pemaquid Point	Southern terminus of SR 129/130 concurrency
Damariscotta	13.4	21.6	US 1 Bus. (Main Street) to US 1 / SR 215 – Newcastle, Nobleboro; SR 130	Northern terminus of SR 129/130
1.000 mi = 1.609 km; 1.000 km = 0.621 mi: Concurrency terminus
