= Loudville Church =

Historic church in Maine, United States

- U.S. National Register of Historic Places
- Location within Maine Location within the United States
- Location: center of Louds Island, near Bristol, Maine
- Coordinates: 43°55′49″N 69°26′7″W
- Area: less than one acre
- Built: 1913
- Built by: Elliott, George
- Architect: Stratton, Milton
- Architectural style: Late Gothic Revival
- NRHP reference No.: 95001457
- Added to NRHP: December 14, 1995

The Loudville Church is a historic non-denominational church building on Louds Island, an unorganized territory of Lincoln County, Maine that is now home to summer residences. The church was built in 1913, using materials from a schoolhouse built in 1908 on Malaga Island. It was listed on the National Register of Historic Places in 1995.

== Description and history ==
Louds Island is located on the west side of Muscongus Bay, off the coast of Bristol near the village of Round Pond. The island was settled in the 1750s, and had a population of about 150 in 1798. By the mid-19th century it had lost most of its permanent population, and was reduced to a summer colony. The island had no church until this one was built in 1913. It is an L-shaped wood-frame structure, 1 1/2 stories in height, with a cross-gabled roof, shingled exterior, and concrete foundation. A three-story tower rises at the crook of the L, topped by a pyramidal roof with flared eaves. It has modest Gothic stylistic elements, including a three-part arched window in one of the gabled sides.

The building's story begins on Malaga Island, located in Maine's Casco Bay. During the 19th century, Malaga was the site of an impoverished settlement of predominantly African-Americans, who were mainly living of the land and sea. In 1908, well-meaning wealthy social reformers built a school on the island in a bid to improve the condition of the children of the residents. The Malaga Island community was forcibly evacuated in 1911, in what has later been described as an act of cultural imperialism. The school was given by its builders to the Maine Seacoast Missionary Society, which raised the funds needed to move it to Louds Island. Its lumber was used to build this church, to a design by Milton Stratton, a Maine architect active in the Mount Desert Island area. The building is maintained by the Louds Island Association, which holds meetings and summer religious services there.

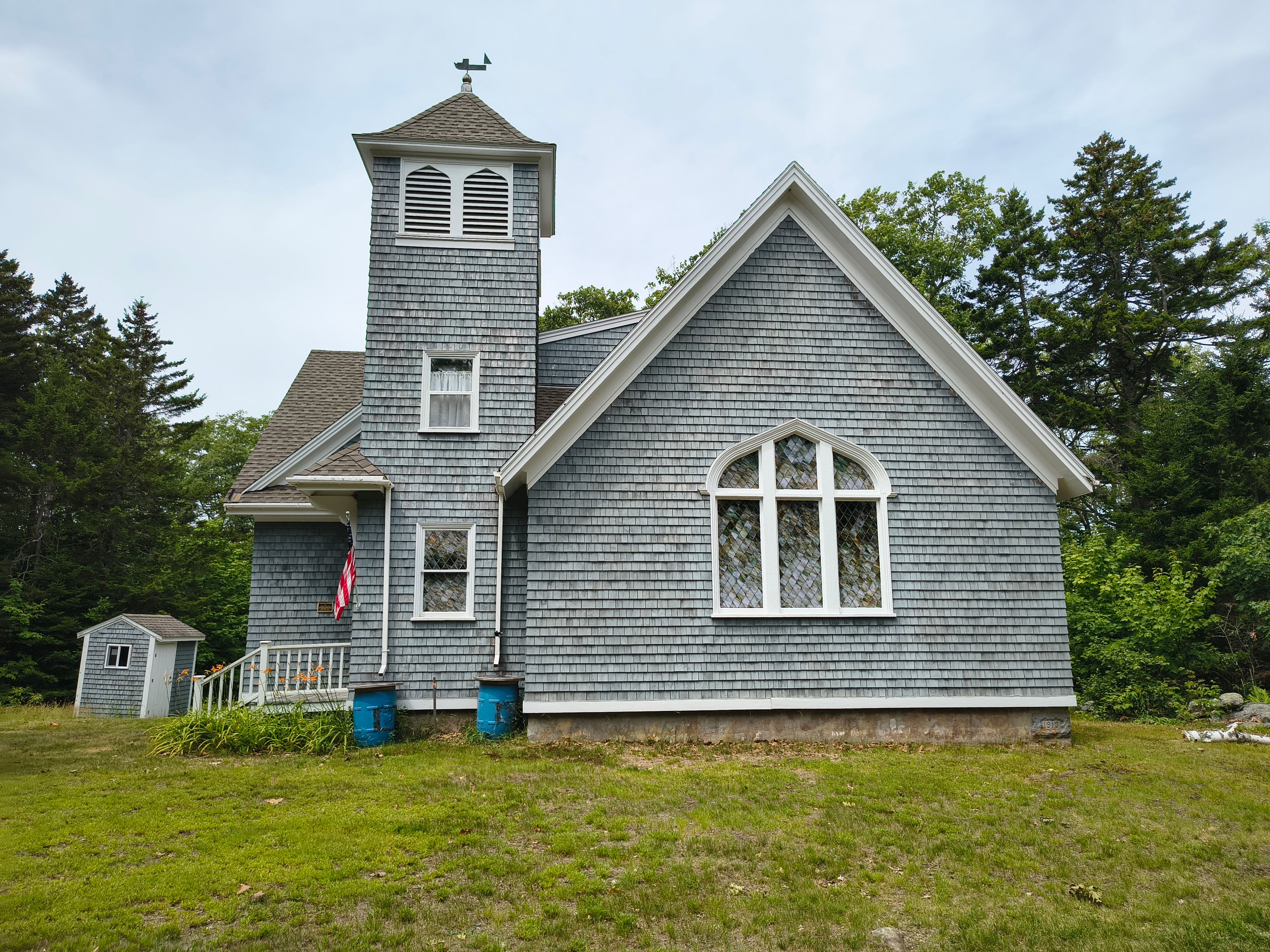
1913 non-denominational church building on Louds Island

== See also ==
- National Register of Historic Places listings in Lincoln County, Maine
