= Dixie Bull =

English sea captain

- Born: c. 1611; Huntingdon, England
- Piratical career
- Nickname: The Dread Pirate
- Type: Pirate
- Allegiance: England
- Years active: 1631–1632
- Rank: Captain
- Base of operations: Boston, Colony of Massachusetts Bay

Dixie Bull (or Dixey Bull) was an English sea captain, and the first pirate known to prey on shipping off the New England coast, especially Maine.

== Biography ==
Born in Huntingdon about 1611, he was apprenticed Skinner to his elder brother, Seth, in 1627 for a period of nine years, but did not complete his indentures until 1648, when he was granted freedom of the city of London in the Worshipful Company of Skinners. He emigrated to Boston, Colony of Massachusetts Bay, in 1632, having been granted a patent of land, and started sailing the Maine coast with a small vessel, trading with the Indians, largely for furs, especially beaver. The Skinners were the livery company whose business was the trade in skins and furs, so he may have been acting as agent for his brother in London. In 1632, traveling in the Penobscot Bay area, he was attacked by a roving band of French in a small pinnace; or possibly he was present in Castine Harbor when a French force attacked the trading post there. Whatever the details, his ship was captured and all his trade goods and provisions confiscated.

Fired with revenge, he traveled back to Boston, assembled a crew of around 25 men, and entered upon a career of piracy to recoup his losses. Ironically, he did not target French shipping, probably because the English traders were wealthier.

His fame as "the dread pirate" derived from his attack in 1632 on the settlement of Pemaquid, which was then center of the lucrative fur trade in Maine. Few pirates had the temerity to attack a defended town. Sailing into the harbour, with what is said to be three ships, he opened fire on the stockade there, and sacked the town. The booty seized is variously said to have been £55 or $2,500.

Some stories say he joined the French, others that he returned to England, and others that he was hanged in Tyburn. Legend says that he buried treasure on Damariscove Island and Cushing Island in Casco Bay, Maine. The fact of his being admitted as a Skinner in 1648 shows that he did survive his piratical career and return to England. Administration of his estate was granted to his sister Susan Kendricks née Bull in Huntingdon in 1656.

The legend of Dixie Bull was soon enshrined in ballads, the most famous of them being "The Story of Dixie Bull" and "The Slaying of Dixie Bull". This ballad describes a duel between Dixie Bull and a fisherman from Pemaquid, Daniel Curtis, on an island near that town, in which Dixie Bull was killed, saving the town.
