= Colonial Pemaquid State Historic Site =

Historic district in Maine, United States

- Pemaquid Archeological Site
- U.S. National Register of Historic Places
- U.S. National Historic Landmark District
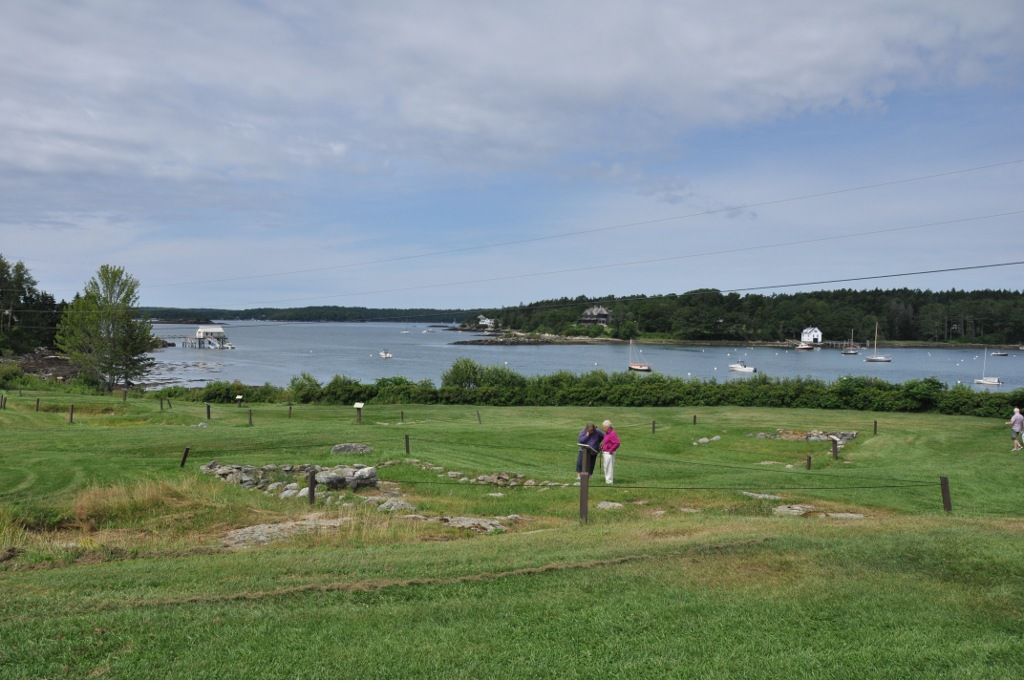
- Foundation holes of the colonial settlement

- Location within Maine Location within the United States
- Interactive map of Pemaquid Archeological Site
- Location: Lincoln County, Maine, USA
- Nearest city: Bristol, Maine
- Coordinates: 43°52′41″N 69°31′17″W
- Area: 24 acres (9.7 ha)
- Built: 1610
- Visitation: 47,691 (2024)
- NRHP reference No.: 69000022

Significant dates
- Added to NRHP: December 2, 1969
- Designated NHLD: April 12, 1993

Colonial Pemaquid State Historic Site is a publicly owned historic property operated by the state of Maine near Pemaquid Beach in Bristol, Maine. The site includes the reconstructed Fort William Henry, archaeological remains of 17th- and 18th-century village buildings and fortifications, and a museum with artifacts found on the site including musket balls, coins, pottery, and early hardware.

Pemaquid was a major regional flashpoint in the late 17th-century and early 18th-century conflicts between English and French settlers, and between English settlers and the local Native population. The site has been of historical and archaeological interest since the late 19th century and has been a state park since 1903. It was listed on the National Register of Historic Places in 1969 (as "Pemaquid Restoration and Museum") and was designated a National Historic Landmark in 1993 (as "Pemaquid Archeological Site").

== Description ==
Colonial Pemaquid is set on a small north-facing peninsula on the south side of the mouth of the Pemaquid River, north of Pemaquid Point, a spit of land in mid-coast Maine. The site is mostly level or gently sloping terrain that has been covered in grass. The site is accessed via a drive from the south, which provides access to parking areas above the main historic settlement area. There is a 20th-century building housing a visitor center and small museum, an 18th-century house that has been repurposed for use as an archaeological laboratory and storage space, and the reconstructed bastion of Fort William Henry at the northwestern tip of the peninsula.

The eastern portion of the site is where the major colonial village was located, and is now only visible as a series of depressions in the grass. The western portion of the site is where Fort William Henry, the 17th-century fortification, and Fort Frederick, the 18th-century fortification, were located. Foundational remnants of some of the buildings remain. Archaeological remains have been judged to have a high state of preservation, since many remains were deep enough to avoid damage when the area was used for agriculture, and those same farming practices resulted in the filling in of cellar holes, further preserving cultural artifacts there.

== History ==
Pemaquid has a colonial settlement history dating to the early decades of the 17th century, with a succession of conflicts leading the site to be attacked on several occasions and entirely abandoned twice. The area was used by English and French traders and fishermen on a seasonal basis for some time, and the first documented permanent residence was established in 1628. The Pemaquid peninsula, located between the mouth of the Kennebec River in the west and Penobscot Bay to the east, was considered by the French as part of Acadia, which they claimed extended to the Kennebec. The early English settlers traded with English settlements further south, as well as the local Abenaki people and the French, sometimes in opposition to the policies of the formal New England colonies to the south.

In 1664 the area was granted by King Charles II to his brother James, Duke of York, and was made part of the Province of New York. At this time the settlement was reported to have less than 30 houses. By 1673, when the area came under the jurisdiction of the Massachusetts Bay Colony, there were more than 40 houses and 150-200 residents. King Philip's War, a major conflict that engulfed New England in 1675, resulted in attacks on Pemaquid and its outlying settlements, and the community was abandoned in 1676. New York authorities reasserted control over the area after the war, and established a formal administration, granting monopoly trading rights to a few favored residents. In 1688 the area was folded into the Dominion of New England. The Dominion governor Edmund Andros built a wooden fort in 1688, which did not prevent the community from being sacked at the outbreak of King William's War in 1689 by a combined force of French and Indians.

The Dominion of New England collapsed in 1692, and Massachusetts authorities constructed the stone Fort William Henry in that year at great expense. Ongoing hostile relations with both the Natives and the French resulted in continued low-level conflict, which elevated in 1696 to a major attack on the settlement in 1696, in which French colonial forces and Indians were assisted by French naval forces in capturing and razing the settlement. Pemaquid would not be resettled until 1729 due to ongoing Native resistance that was not quelled until the 1720s Dummer's War.

In 1729 David Dunbar, a local crown representative and entrepreneur, sought to establish a colony of Irish settlers called "Georgia" at Pemaquid, and constructed Fort Frederick. Massachusetts political leaders opposed this attempt to establish another colony, and successfully petitioned the king to regain control of the area. Settlers remained, but the area's military importance declined, especially after New France fell in 1759 during the French and Indian War. Fort Frederick was demolished by local authorities during the American Revolutionary War to prevent its use by British troops, and the area became a rural backwater.

Historical interest in the area was stimulated in the late 19th century, and early archaeological investigation uncovered the foundations of the fort. The state acquired the site in 1903, and the large circular bastion of Fort William Henry was reconstructed (based on Colonel Wolfgang William Romer's drawings dating to 1699) in 1908. The site was investigated by archaeologist Warren K. Moorehead in the 1920s, but systematic investigation of the site did not begin until the 1960s, and continues to this day.

== See also ==
- List of National Historic Landmarks in Maine
- National Register of Historic Places listings in Lincoln County, Maine
