= David Dunbar (colonel) =

British military officer

David Dunbar (fl. 1728–1737) was a British military officer, a surveyor of the King's woods in North America, and lieutenant governor of the Province of New Hampshire. Of Scotch-Irish origin, Dunbar married into a wealthy and politically influential family, and received his first North American appointment, that of Surveyor of the King's Woods, in 1728, through the influence of his family connections and that of Martin Bladen, a member of the Board of Trade. In this position he made numerous local enemies in his enforcement of regulations governing the cutting of trees that could be used as ship masts. He was the leader of an attempt to establish a colony named "Georgia" in what is now the central coast of Maine, and was in 1730 commissioned as lieutenant governor of the Province of New Hampshire in an attempt to strengthen his authority. He engaged in frequent disputes with Massachusett's Governor Jonathan Belcher. He established Fort Frederick in Maine. In 1734, in an attempt to enforce the Broad Arrow policy of the Massachusetts Charter governing the protection of white pine trees of diameter greater than 24 inches for use in the making of ship masts, Dunbar and a group of his enforcers were run out of Exeter, New Hampshire. Dunbar had been interrogating townspeople about a large supply of white pine logs floating in a mill pond and about the ownership of the nearest timber mill.
