= Marcus Hanna (lighthouse keeper) =

American lighthouse keeper

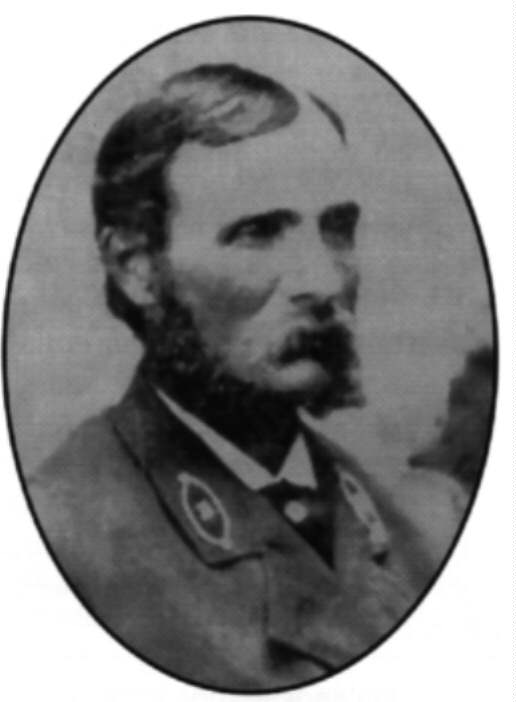
- Marcus Hanna
- Born: Marcus Aurelius Hanna; November 3, 1842; Bristol, Maine, US
- Died: December 21, 1921 (aged 79)
- Burial place: Mount Pleasant Cemetery, South Portland, Maine, US
- Military career
- Allegiance: United States (Union)
- Branch: United States Navy; United States Army; United States Coast Guard
- Service years: 1861-1865
- Rank: Sergeant
- Units: Company B, 50th Massachusetts Volunteer Infantry
- Conflicts: American Civil War
- Awards: Medal of Honor; Gold Lifesaving Medal; Civil War Campaign Medal

Marcus Aurelius Hanna (November 3, 1842 – December 21, 1921) was an American lighthouse keeper famous for his heroism. He is the only person in history to have received both the Medal of Honor and the Gold Lifesaving Medal.

== Early life ==
Hanna was born in Bristol, Maine, the son of the keeper of the Franklin Island Light. He spent his early years at the station before going off to sea at the age of ten. By 18 he had risen to the position of ship's steward.

== Civil War service ==
When the American Civil War began, Hanna enlisted, serving in the Navy for one year before being mustered out. He spent the remainder of the war fighting with various volunteer regiments. He saw action in 1863 at Port Hudson, Louisiana while serving as a sergeant with the 50th Massachusetts Infantry. During the engagement, Hanna volunteered to carry water behind the lines to the remainder of his company. This was the heaviest action he was to see during the war and for which he later received the Medal of Honor.

== Lighthouse keeper ==
After the war, Hanna was appointed keeper of Pemaquid Point Light in his hometown of Bristol, Maine in 1869. In 1873 he was transferred to Two Lights in Cape Elizabeth, Maine, where he served as head lightkeeper.

It was while serving at Two Lights, on January 28, 1885, that he risked his life to save two sailors from the schooner Australia which had wrecked on the rocks below the station. According to the official Coast Guard website, Hanna braved a blizzard in freezing temperatures, at the risk of his life, to throw a line to the ship which was being battered against the rocks. He successfully got both sailors off the ship and brought them to the nearby fog signal house where the sailors were able to be warmed to save them from exposure and frostbite.

Hanna was awarded the Gold Lifesaving Medal on April 25, 1885, for saving the two sailors. He also received the Medal of Honor in 1895, in recognition of his bravery at Port Hudson while a sergeant in the 50th Massachusetts Infantry. Hanna is the only person in history to have received both awards - the highest military and civilian decorations for heroism awarded by the United States.

== Death and burial ==
Hanna died on December 21, 1921, and is buried in Mount Pleasant Cemetery in South Portland, Maine.

== Honors ==
Sergeant Hanna received the following medals -

- Medal of Honor
- Gold Lifesaving Medal
- Civil War Campaign Medal

In 1997 the United States Coast Guard named a Keeper-class buoy tender for Hanna. The USCGC Marcus Hanna is based in South Portland, Maine, near the site of Hanna's rescue of the sailors from the Australia in 1885.

== Medal of Honor citation ==
Rank and organization: Sergeant, Company B, 50th Regiment, Massachusetts Volunteer Infantry. Place and date: At Port Hudson, La., July 4, 1863. Entered service at: Rockport, Mass. Born: November 3, 1842, Bristol, Maine. Date of issue: November 2, 1895.

Citation:

Voluntarily exposed himself to a heavy fire to get water for comrades in rifle pits.

== See also ==
- List of American Civil War Medal of Honor recipients: G–L
