= Elizabeth Upham Yates =

American lecturer (1857–1942)

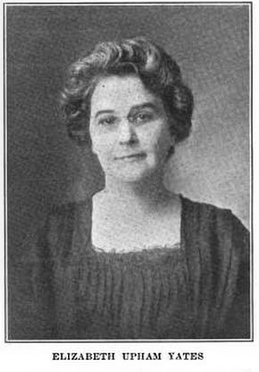
- Elizabeth Upham Yates, from a 1917 publication.
- Born: July 3, 1857; Bristol, Maine
- Died: December 23, 1942 (aged 85); Rhode Island
- Occupations: Missionary, Politician, Suffragist

Elizabeth Upham Yates (July 3, 1857 — December 23, 1942) was an American suffragist and missionary in China. She was also one of the first two women to run for statewide office in Rhode Island.

== Early life ==
Elizabeth Upham Yates was born in Bristol, Maine, the daughter of Alexander Yates and Lois Thompson Yates. She studied oratory at the Boston School of Expression with the actress Sarah Cowell Le Moyne, and earned a license to preach in the Methodist Episcopal Church tradition.

== Career ==
From 1880 to 1885, Elizabeth Upham Yates worked in China under the auspices of the Women's Foreign Missionary Society. She wrote about her experiences as a missionary in Glimpses into Chinese Homes, published in 1887.

Elizabeth Upham Yates began lecturing for the temperance and suffrage movements in 1890. She spoke at a convention of the New England Woman's Suffrage Association in 1895 in Nashua, New Hampshire, on the same program as Julia Ward Howe and Alice Stone Blackwell. She regularly traveled within and beyond New England to lecture on the case for suffrage and encourage suffrage workers in other states.

Yates was elected president of the Rhode Island Women's Suffrage Association in 1909, and re-elected in 1911 and 1913. She delivered the Fourth of July address at the Providence City Hall, a novelty for a woman at the time. She spoke on her work leading the Presidential Suffrage Committee at the 1914 national convention of the National American Woman Suffrage Association in Nashville, Tennessee. When Rhode Island women were first permitted to register to vote, she published "An Open Letter to Women" (1919), exhorting women to have "jubilant hearts, but sobered minds" in accepting their new duty of suffrage.

She was the Democratic Party nominee for lieutenant governor of Rhode Island in 1920, one of the first women to run for statewide office in Rhode Island (along with Helen I. Binning, who ran for Secretary of State on the same ticket). In 1934 she joined Carrie Chapman Catt's "committee of ten" prominent women, in petitioning Franklin Delano Roosevelt to admit German refugees fleeing Nazi persecution.

== Personal life ==
Elizabeth Upham Yates died in 1942, aged 85 years, in Rhode Island. Her house in Providence, built in 1913, is listed on the National Register of Historic Places as part of the Blackstone Park Historic District.
