= South Bristol, Maine =

Town in Maine, U.S.

- Town
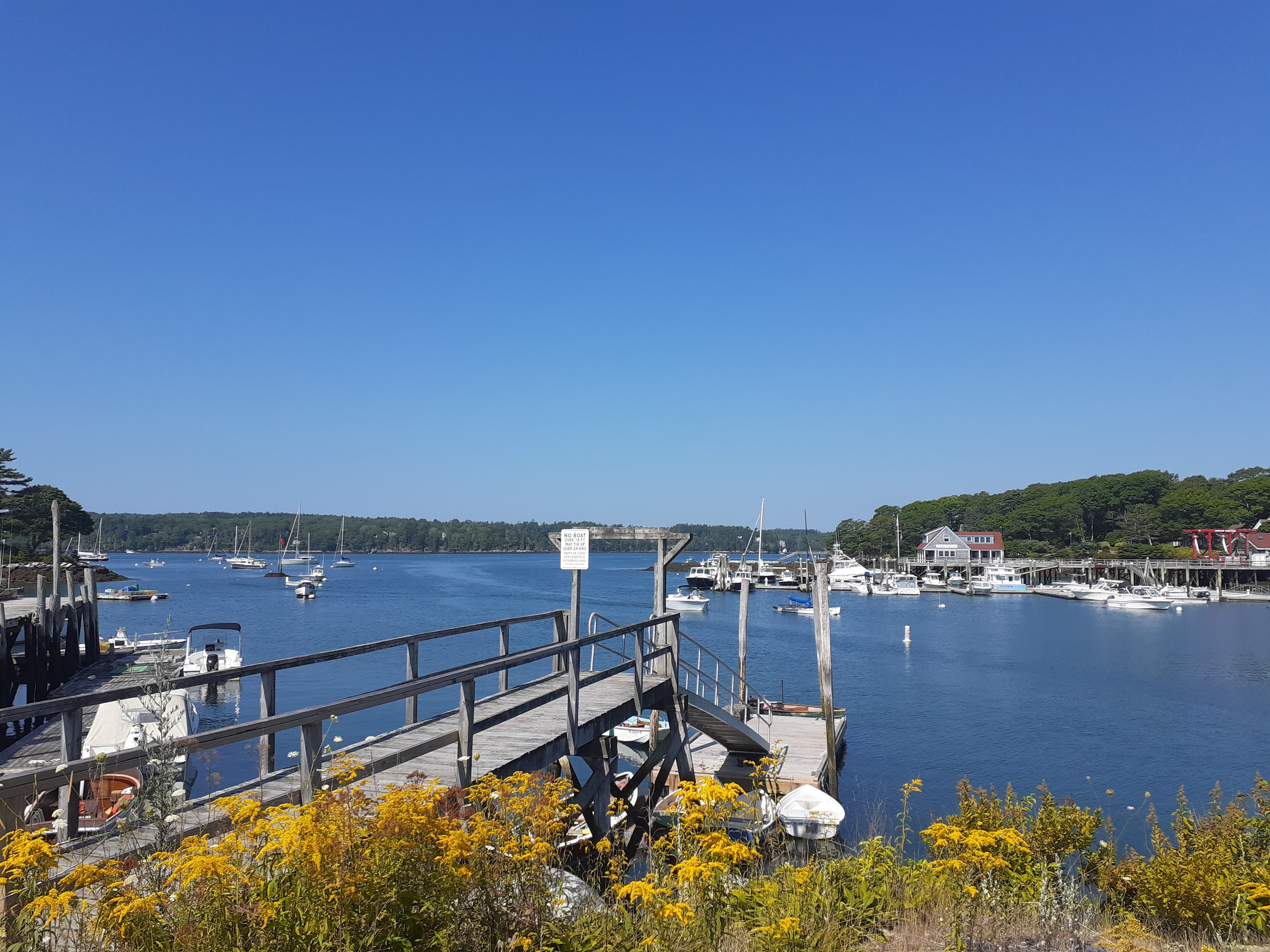
- South Bristol Gut in 2022

- Logo

- Location in Lincoln County and the state of Maine
- Coordinates: 43°50′40″N 69°32′52″W
- Country: United States
- State: Maine
- County: Lincoln
- Incorporated: 1915

Area
  - Total: 29.68 sq mi (76.87 km^{2})
  - Land: 13.10 sq mi (33.93 km^{2})
  - Water: 16.58 sq mi (42.94 km^{2})
- Elevation: 66 ft (20 m)

Population (2020)
  - Total: 1,127
  - Density: 86/sq mi (33.2/km^{2})
- Time zone: UTC-5 (Eastern (EST))
  - Summer (DST): UTC-4 (EDT)
- ZIP Codes: 04568 (South Bristol); 04573 (Walpole)
- Area code: 207
- FIPS code: 23-70240
- GNIS feature ID: 582733
- Website: sbristolme.gov

South Bristol is a town in Lincoln County, Maine, United States. The population was 1,127 at the 2020 census. A fishing and resort area, South Bristol includes the villages of Walpole and Christmas Cove, the latter on Rutherford Island. The town has six nature preserves.

== History ==
The town was once territory of the Wawenock (or more precisely Walinakiak, meaning "People of the Bays") Abenaki people, who traveled in canoes to hunt for fish, shellfish, seals and seafowl. In 1614, Captain John Smith explored the coast, and is said to have named Christmas Cove when he visited it on Christmas Day. The land was subsequently part of the Pemaquid Patent, granted by the Plymouth Council for New England in 1631 to Robert Aldsworth and Gyles Elbridge, merchants from Bristol, England, from which the town derives its name.

A palisade fort and settlement were built on the adjacent Pemaquid Peninsula. Between 1630 and 1650, the area was the center for fur trading in Maine. It was attacked and rebuilt repeatedly during the French and Indian Wars, with the final two attacks occurring in 1747 at Fort Frederick. In 1765, Bristol was incorporated as a town, with South Bristol its western portion. On March 26, 1915, South Bristol was set off and incorporated as a separate town.

In the 1800s, the village of Walpole was noted for brickmaking and ice harvesting. Brickyards along the Damariscotta River supplied many of the bricks used to build Boston's Back Bay neighborhood. The ice business faded with the advent of refrigeration, but the Thompson Ice House, established in 1826, is now preserved as the Thompson Ice Harvesting Museum. The Bristol Yacht Building Company, later known as H.F. Gamage Shipbuilding, built minesweepers for the United States Navy during World War II. Shipbuilding has remained important, with schooners, fishing trawlers, lobster boats and yachts constructed at the town. The Hudson River Sloop Clearwater was built here in 1968. Other industries in South Bristol are fishing, lobstering, clamming, aquaculture and tourism.

The peninsula and Rutherford Island were connected by a swing bridge, one of only three in Maine, which spanned "The Gut." In 2017 the swing bridge was replaced with a safer drawbridge. For well over a century, Rutherford Island in particular has been a vacation destination for families from Massachusetts, Connecticut, New York and New Jersey. Many homes on the island are owned by these families.

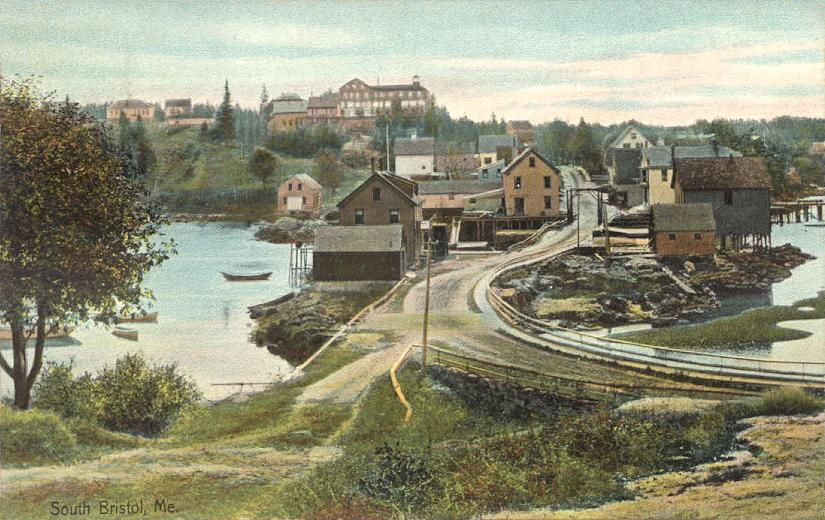
View of South Bristol in 1908

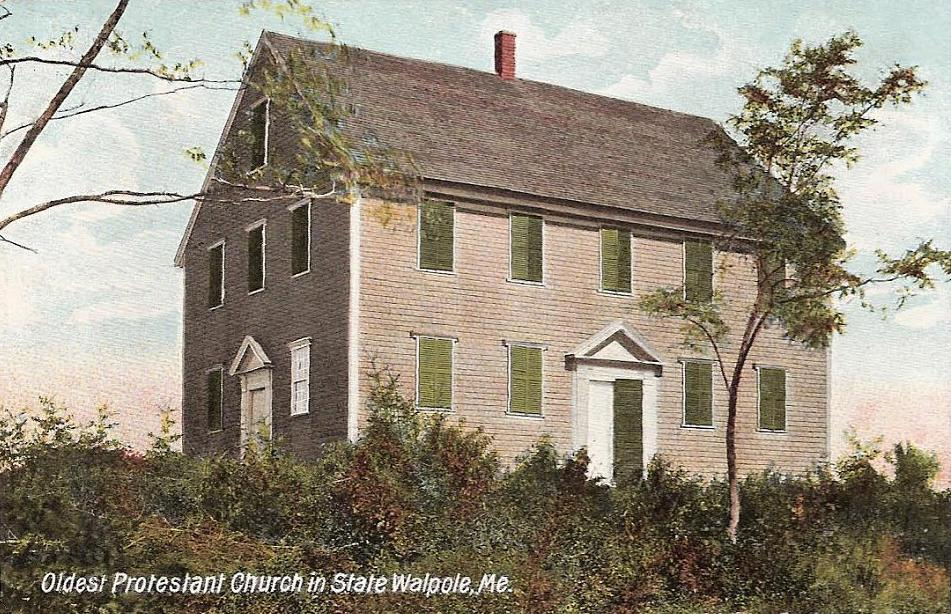
Walpole Meeting House c. 1908

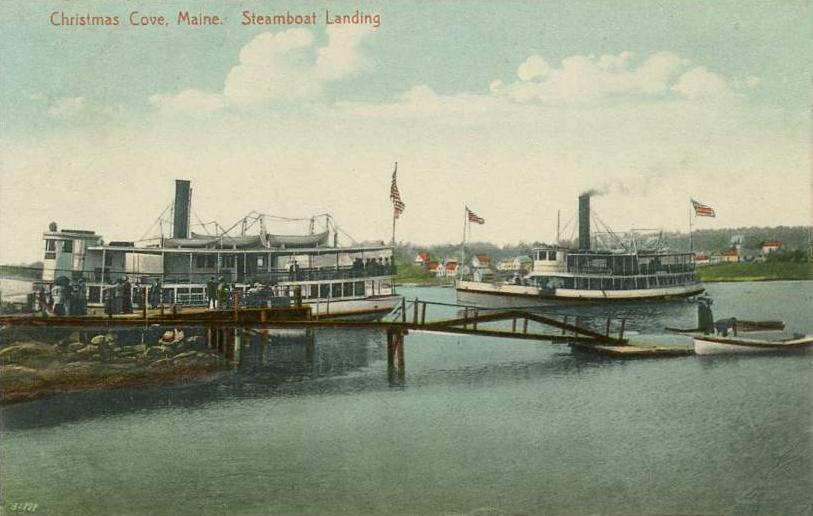
Steamboat landing in 1910

== Geography ==
The town is in southern Lincoln County, bordered to the west by the tidal Damariscotta River, to the east by Johns Bay and the tidal Johns River, and to the south by the Atlantic Ocean. The southern one-third of the town is on Rutherford Island, separated from the mainland by The Gut. The island was named after the Reverend Robert Rutherford, who came with David Dunbar's group to the area from North Ireland in 1729. The village of South Bristol is on both sides of The Gut, while Christmas Cove is at the south end of Rutherford Island, and the locales of West Bristol and Walpole are to the north on the mainland. The town of Bristol is to the east and north, while the towns of Newcastle, Edgecomb, and Boothbay (listed from north to south) are to the west across the Damariscotta River.

According to the United States Census Bureau, the town of South Bristol has a total area of 29.68 square miles (76.87 km^{2}), of which 13.10 square miles (33.93 km^{2}) are land and 16.58 square miles (42.94 km^{2}), or 55.85%, are water.

The town is crossed by Maine State Route 129. The highway leads north to Damariscotta, 13 miles (21 km) from South Bristol village.

== Demographics ==
Historical population
Census	Pop.	Note	%±
1920	581		—
1930	563		−3.1%
1940	582		3.4%
1950	631		8.4%
1960	610		−3.3%
1970	664		8.9%
1980	800		20.5%
1990	825		3.1%
2000	897		8.7%
2010	892		−0.6%
2020	1,127		26.3%
U.S. Decennial Census

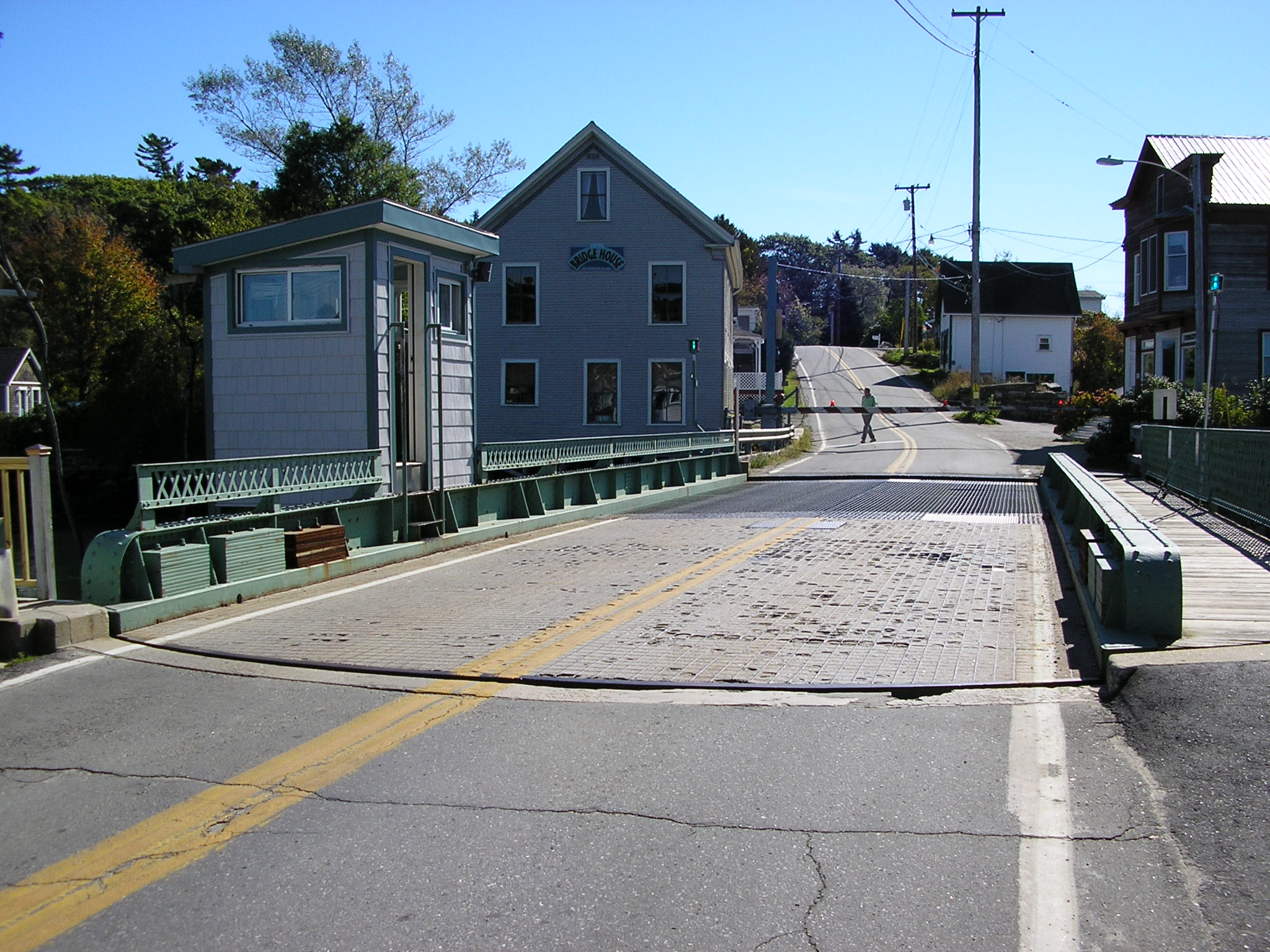
The former swing bridge

=== 2010 census ===
As of the census of 2010, there were 892 people, 418 households, and 275 families residing in the town. The population density was 68.1 inhabitants per square mile (26.3/km^{2}). There were 1,076 housing units at an average density of 82.1 per square mile (31.7/km^{2}). The racial makeup of the town was 98.5% White, 0.6% African American, 0.1% Native American, 0.2% Asian, and 0.6% from two or more races. Hispanic or Latino of any race were 0.6% of the population.

There were 418 households, of which 19.6% had children under the age of 18 living with them, 55.7% were married couples living together, 8.1% had a female householder with no husband present, 1.9% had a male householder with no wife present, and 34.2% were non-families. 29.4% of all households were made up of individuals, and 16% had someone living alone who was 65 years of age or older. The average household size was 2.13 and the average family size was 2.57.

The median age in the town was 54.1 years. 15.8% of residents were under the age of 18; 3.8% were between the ages of 18 and 24; 17.2% were from 25 to 44; 32.9% were from 45 to 64; and 30.2% were 65 years of age or older. The gender makeup of the town was 48.4% male and 51.6% female.

=== 2000 census ===
As of the census of 2000, there were 897 people, 410 households, and 277 families residing in the town. The population density was 68.0 inhabitants per square mile (26.3/km^{2}). There were 932 housing units at an average density of 70.7 per square mile (27.3/km^{2}). The racial makeup of the town was 99.00% White, 0.11% Native American, 0.22% Asian, and 0.67% from two or more races. Hispanic or Latino of any race were 0.45% of the population.

There were 410 households, out of which 20.5% had children under the age of 18 living with them, 60.0% were married couples living together, 4.9% had a female householder with no husband present, and 32.2% were non-families. 25.4% of all households were made up of individuals, and 12.9% had someone living alone who was 65 years of age or older. The average household size was 2.19 and the average family size was 2.58.

In the town, the population was spread out, with 16.7% under the age of 18, 4.6% from 18 to 24, 18.8% from 25 to 44, 34.9% from 45 to 64, and 25.0% who were 65 years of age or older. The median age was 52 years. For every 100 females, there were 98.5 males. For every 100 females age 18 and over, there were 97.6 males.

The median income for a household in the town was $38,636, and the median income for a family was $46,765. Males had a median income of $31,696 versus $21,563 for females. The per capita income for the town was $28,233. About 3.5% of families and 7.5% of the population were below the poverty line, including 6.0% of those under age 18 and 15.0% of those age 65 or over.

== Education ==
The school district is the South Bristol School District. South Bristol School is a part of the Central Lincoln County School System (Alternative Organizational Structure 93).

For high school, AOS 93 does not have a public high school. It sends high school students to Lincoln Academy, a private school, and pays tuition. Students in the AOS 93 area are free to select other high schools instead, with tuition paid there.

== Sites of interest ==
- South Bristol Historical Society
- Thompson Ice Harvesting Museum
- Walpole Meeting House (1772)
- Witch Island Preserve
