= Cape Elizabeth Light =

Lighthouse in Maine, US

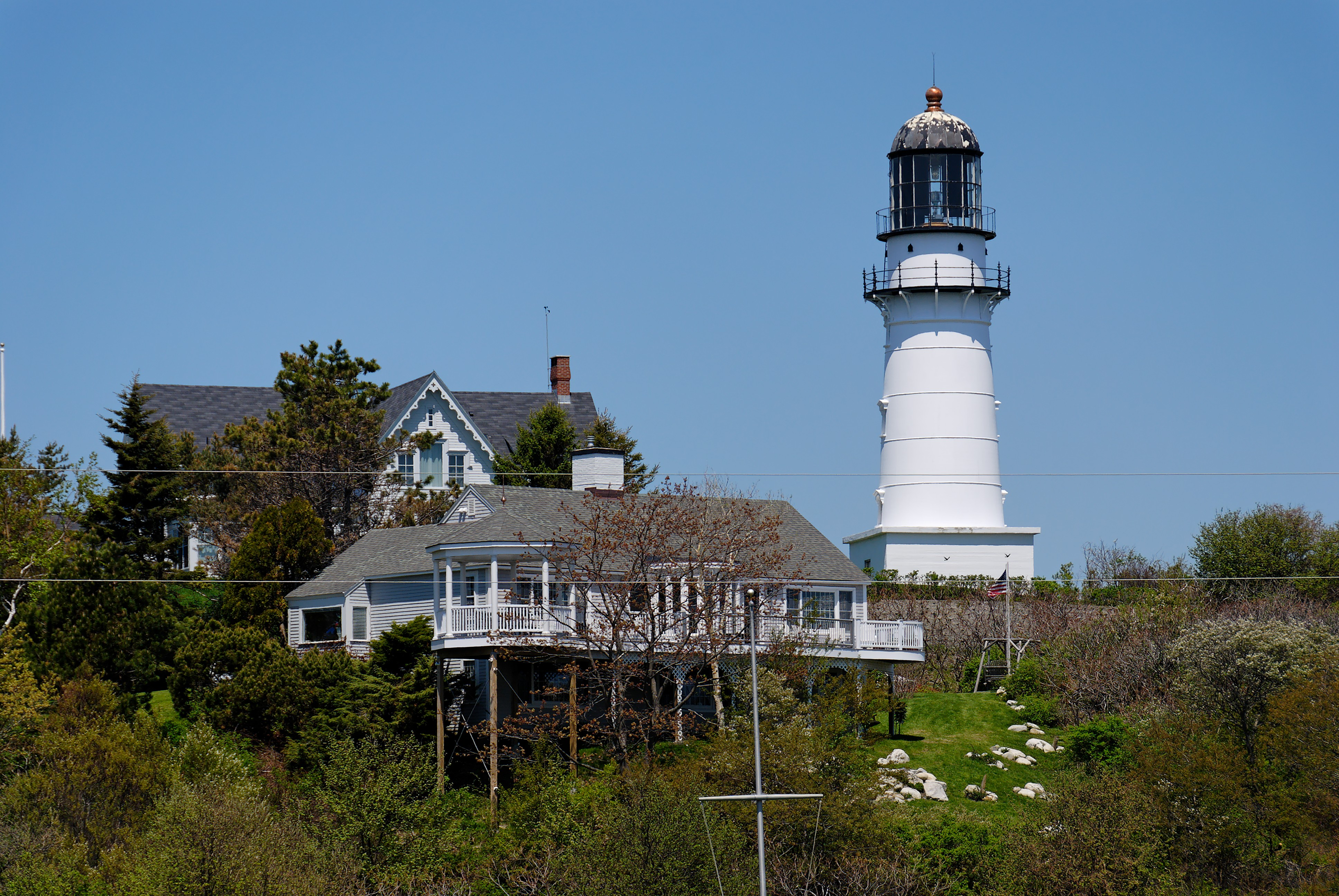
- Location: Cape Elizabeth, United States
- Coordinates: 43°33′57.846″N 70°12′.209″W

Tower
- Constructed: 1828
- Foundation: Stone
- Construction: Cast iron
- Automated: 1963
- Height: 20 m (66 ft)
- Shape: Conical tower attached to entrance tower; East tower conical without lantern
- Markings: White with black trim, East Tower White.
- Heritage: National Register of Historic Places listed place
- Fog signal: HORN: 2 every 60s

Light
- First lit: 1874 (current tower)
- Deactivated: West tower was deactivated in 1924
- Focal height: 129 feet (39 m)
- Lens: 2nd order Fresnel lens (original), VRB-25 (current)
- Range: 15 nautical miles (28 km; 17 mi)
- Characteristic: Fl W(4) 15s
- Two Lights
- U.S. National Register of Historic Places
- Location within Maine Location within the United States
- Location: Cape Elizabeth, Maine
- Built: 1874
- Architectural style: Gothic Revival
- NRHP reference No.: 74000167
- Added to NRHP: December 27, 1974

Cape Elizabeth Light (also known as Two Lights) is a lighthouse in Cape Elizabeth, at the southwestern entrance to Casco Bay in Maine.

Only the eastern tower of the two that made up the light station until 1924 is active. Until recently, the eastern light used a second-order Fresnel lens. The western tower is deactivated, but remains standing. Public Access to the light station is prohibited by both the US Government and multiple private landowners. There is a small beach and parking area adjacent to the property, however. Good views of one of the two towers can be found at the small beach or on the rocks that protect it. The deactivated tower can be easily seen from the rocks. The facility is adjacent to Two Lights State Park, a 41-acre (17 ha) state facility. However, the park no longer has view of the lighthouses, and some people opt to tour the area by boat to avoid trespassing. The park was the Cape Elizabeth Military Reservation, part of the Harbor Defenses of Portland, in World War II, during which the former western lighthouse was a fire control tower.

Cape Elizabeth Light, designed in the Gothic Revival style, was added to the National Register of Historic Places as Two Lights on December 27, 1974.

== History ==
The area is known as "Two Lights" due to the history of the station. It was originally built in 1828 as two rubble stone towers 300 yards (270 m) apart. A steam-driven warning whistle was installed in the nearby brick fog signal station in 1869, the first used in North America. In 1874, both structures were replaced by conical towers made of cast-iron, each 67 feet (20 m) high and 129 feet (39 m) above sea level. Despite its twin beacons, Cape Elizabeth witnessed many shipwrecks. In January 1885, during a raging snowstorm, keeper Marcus A. Hanna made a daring rescue of two seamen from the schooner Australia, which had run aground on a nearby ledge.

The use of multiple lights in a given site was discontinued in 1924. The western light was removed from service, and was converted into a coastal artillery fire control tower for the Harbor Defenses of Portland, serving as such through World War II. It was eventually sold in 1971 to retired actor Gary Merrill, who had been previously married to Bette Davis. Merrill sold the property in 1983.

The eastern tower remains in service as "Cape Elizabeth Light" and is often used as a motif for artists. Artist Edward Hopper painted Two Lights in Lighthouse Hill (1927) and The Lighthouse at Two Lights (1929); the latter was used on a U.S. postage stamp in 1970.

=== From Coast Guard website ===
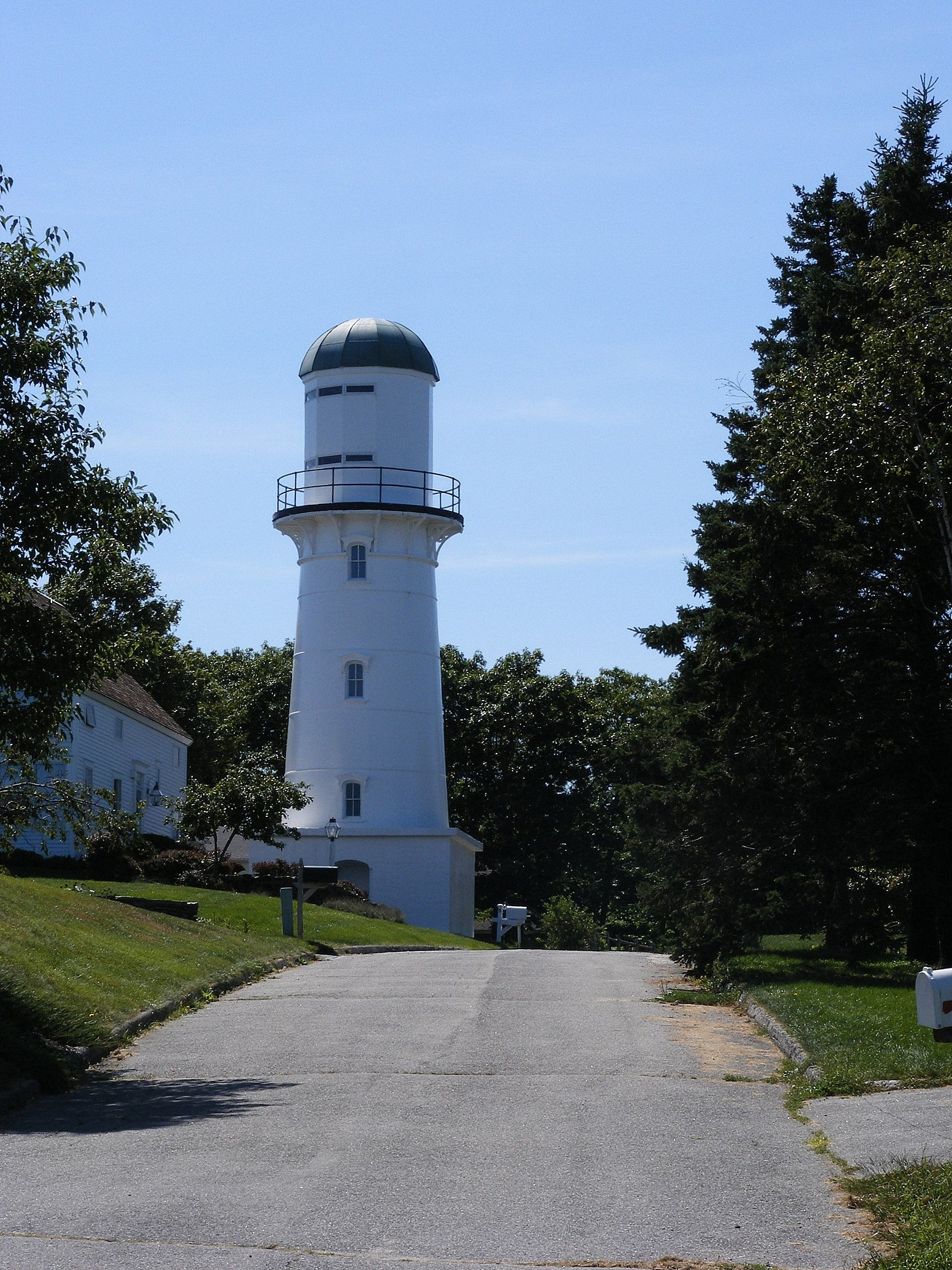
The western tower

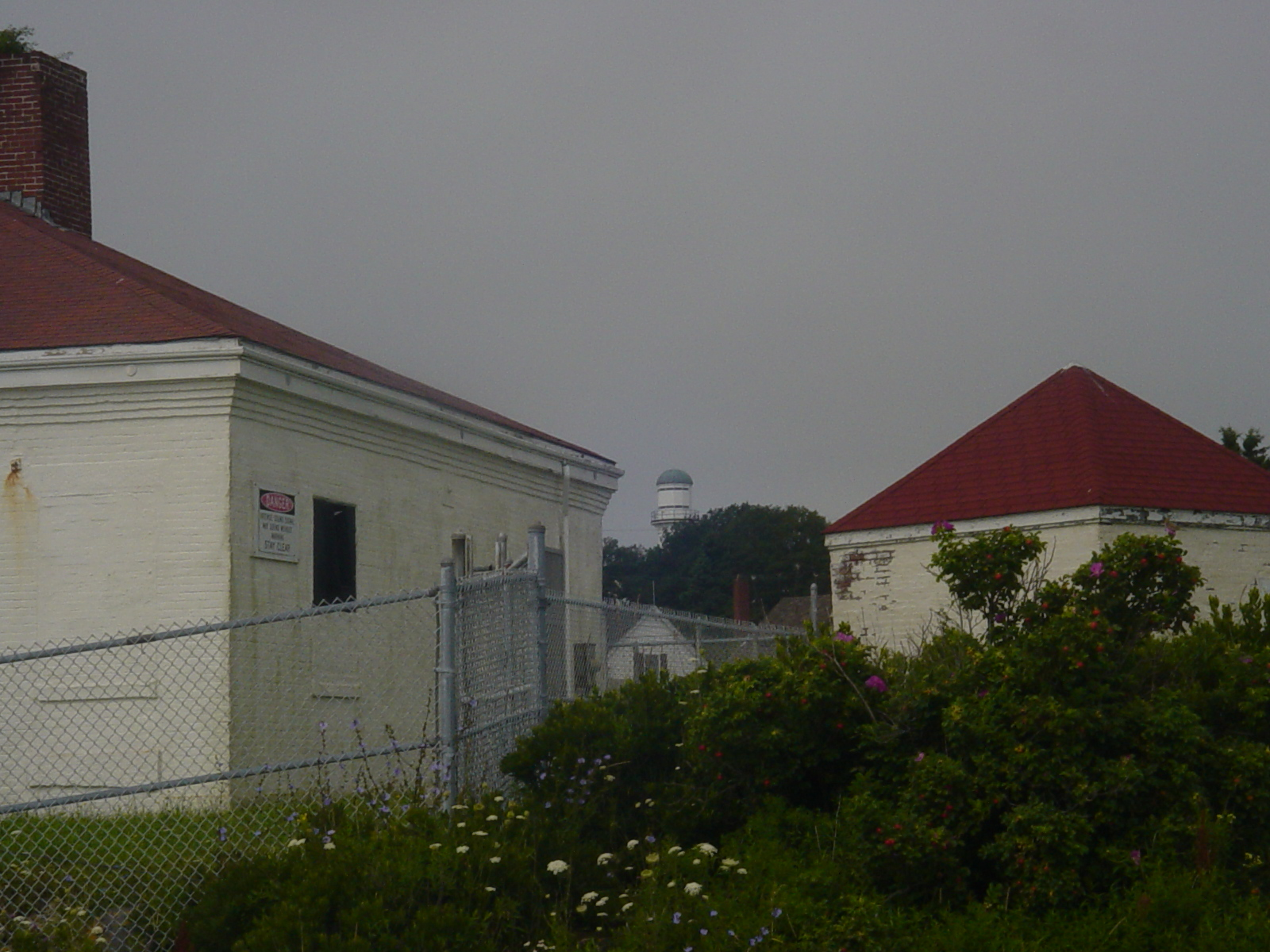
The western tower (background), as well as the whistle house of the eastern tower

Two rubble stone towers were first erected on Cape Elizabeth in 1828 at a cost of $4,250. President John Quincy Adams appointed Elisha Jordan as the first keeper in October 1828 at a salary of $450 per year.

In 1855 Fresnel lenses were installed and in 1869 a giant steam whistle was set up for use in foggy weather. In 1873 the rubble towers were taken down and two cast-iron edifices erected, 300 yards (270 m) apart. One was a fixed and one a flashing light. A fog siren replaced the locomotive whistle.

==== Schooner Australia aground ====
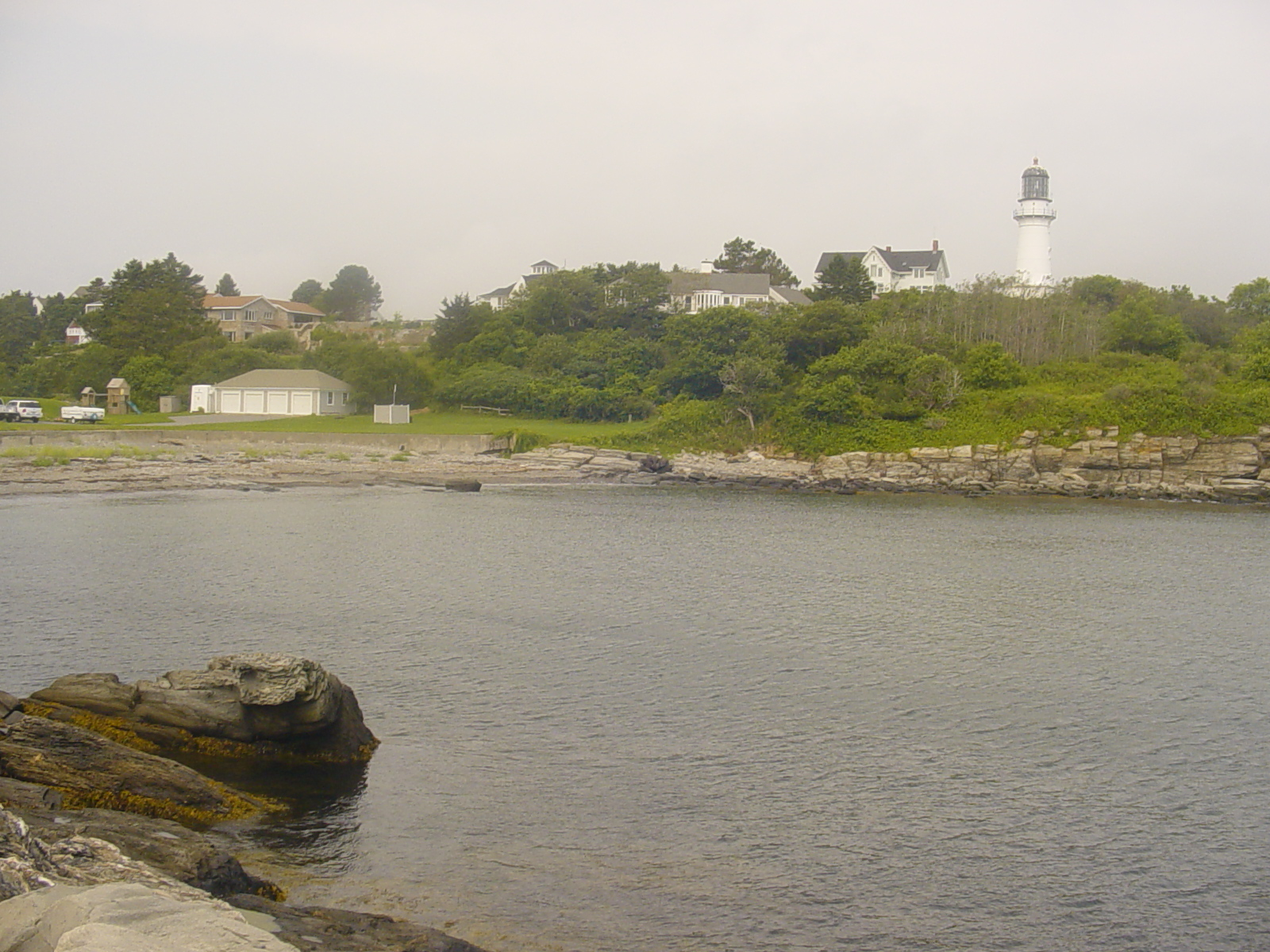
View of eastern tower from Casco Bay entrance.

One of the most thrilling episodes in the history of the lighthouse occurred on January 28, 1885, when Keeper Marcus A. Hanna saved two crew members of the schooner Australia which had run aground on the ledge near the fog signal station. The two men had taken to the rigging and were coated with ice, unable to move. The captain was drowned as a huge comber washed the deck. Keeper Hanna, securing a heavy iron weight to the end of a stout line, attempted time and again to reach the men with it. Suddenly a towering wave struck the schooner and smashed her against the rocks, putting her on her beam ends.

Keeper Hanna again threw his line and watched it land on the schooner. One of the seamen managed to reach it and bent it around his waist. Then he jumped into the sea and the keeper, with great effort, pulled him up over the rocky ledge. The keeper now heaved the line a second time and finally it reached the second seaman who wound it around his icy body. Then he too jumped into the ocean. Just as the keeper's strength was exhausted in trying to haul ashore the second man, help came in the shape of the keeper's assistant and two neighbors, who helped haul the man to safety.

== See also ==
- National Register of Historic Places listings in Cumberland County, Maine
