= Bristol, Maine =

Town in Maine, United States

- Town
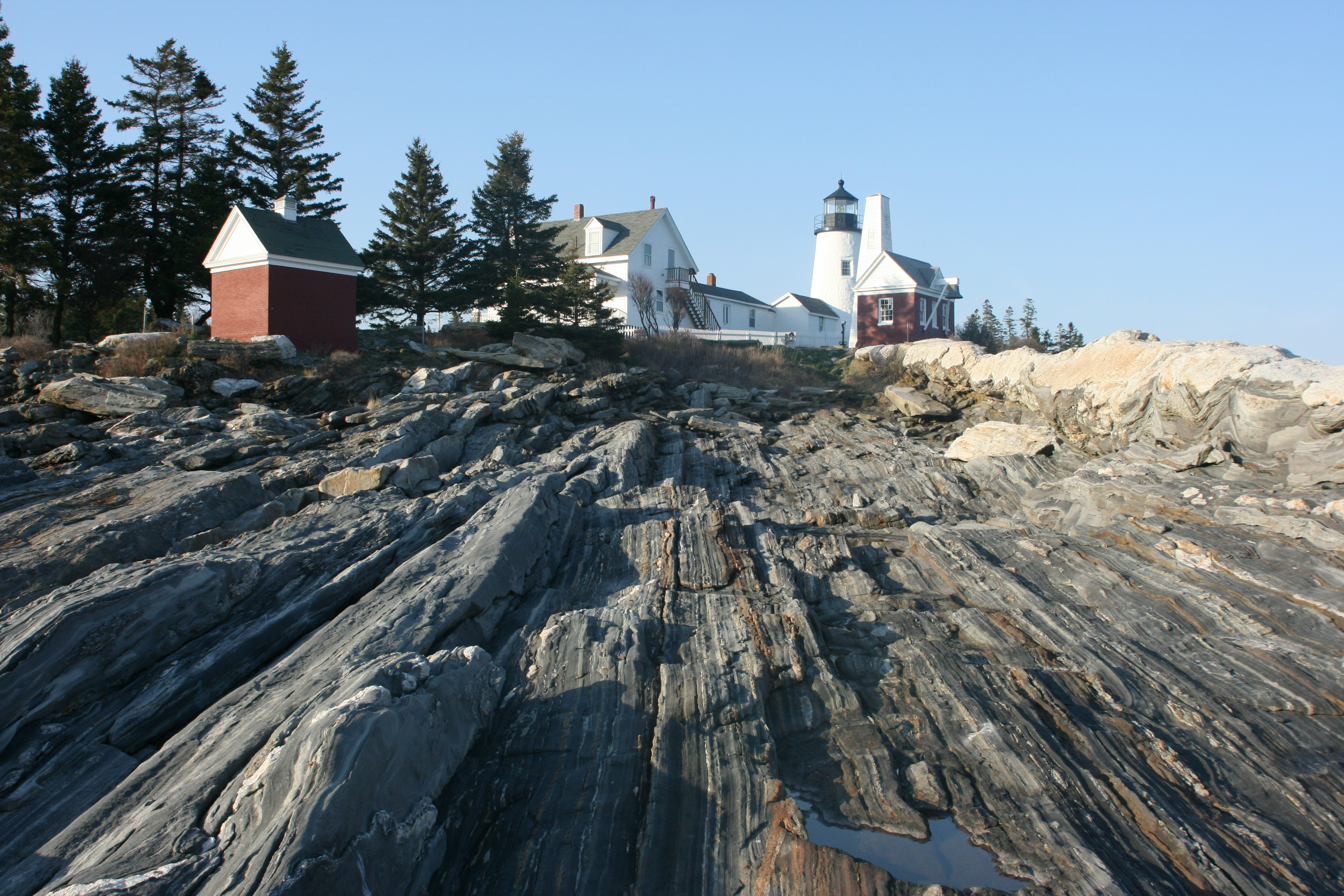
- Pemaquid Point Lighthouse

- Seal

- Location in Lincoln County and the state of Maine.
- Coordinates: 43°55′29″N 69°29′44″W
- Country: United States
- State: Maine
- County: Lincoln
- Incorporated: June 21, 1765

Area
  - Total: 78.23 sq mi (202.61 km^{2})
  - Land: 33.99 sq mi (88.03 km^{2})
  - Water: 44.24 sq mi (114.58 km^{2})
- Elevation: 121 ft (37 m)

Population (2020)
  - Total: 2,834
  - Density: 83/sq mi (32.2/km^{2})
- Time zone: UTC-5 (Eastern (EST))
  - Summer (DST): UTC-4 (EDT)
- ZIP Codes: 04539 (Bristol); 04541 (Chamberlain); 04554 (New Harbor); 04558 (Pemaquid); 04564 (Round Pond)
- Area code: 207
- FIPS code: 23-07485
- GNIS feature ID: 582369
- Website: www.bristolmaine.org

Bristol, known from 1632 to 1765 as Pemaquid (/ˈpɛməkwɪd/; today a village within the town), is a town in Lincoln County, Maine, United States. The population was 2,834 at the 2020 census. A fishing and resort area, Bristol includes the villages of New Harbor, Pemaquid, Round Pond, Bristol Mills and Chamberlain. It includes the Pemaquid Archeological Site, a U.S. National Historic Landmark. During the 17th and early 18th century, New France defined the Kennebec River as the southern boundary of Acadia, which put Bristol within Acadia. The village was called Pemquit by the French.

== History ==
Once territory of the Wawenock (or Walinakiak, meaning "People of the Bay") Abenaki Indians, early Bristol was one of the most important and embattled frontier settlements in the province. Beginning with seasonal fishing, as early as 1625 the English established at Pemaquid Point a year-round trading post for fur trading. In 1631, the area was granted as the Pemaquid Patent by the Plymouth Council to Robert Aldsworth and Gyles Elbridge, merchants from Bristol, England.

=== Raid on Pemaquid (1632) ===
A village and palisade fort were constructed.

In 1632, Pemaquid was raided and plundered by the pirate Dixie Bull. While Bull is widely considered New England's first pirate, he was born in Huntingdon, England, around 1611. In 1632, Bull arrived in Boston, Massachusetts, and began his career sailing along the New England coastline, trading animal furs and skins with the Wabanaki.

In 1632, Bull was attacked by French pirates who stole all of his goods, leaving him with only his ship. In the following weeks, Bull searched for the French pirates but was unsuccessful. In desperation, Bull gathered a group of men and began attacking and looting other boats along the coast. Landing in Pemaquid later in 1632, Bull and his men attacked the local warehouse and looted all of the homes in the area. According to historical accounts, they looted £500 worth of goods. Panic spread throughout Pemaquid, as this was the first time severe looting had happened. Governor Winthrop of Massachusetts sent out four boats to hunt down Bull and his men, but they were unsuccessful. While rumors and legends about Bull grew over the years, there are no consistent historical accounts of where he went.

The Great Colonial Hurricane on August 15, 1635 sank the galleon Angel Gabriel while it was anchored off the settlement, drowning some crew and passengers.

In 1664, the Duke of York (the future King James II) claimed Pemaquid was within his patent, which also included Sagadahoc and recently acquired New Amsterdam. To help anglicize the latter into New York City, Governor Sir Edmund Andros had some of its Dutch inhabitants transported to Pemaquid, now called Jamestown for its royal owner. By 1665, the village had approximately 30 houses.

=== King Philip's War ===
==== Raid on Pemaquid (1676) ====
During King Philip's War, in 1676 Indians attacked and burned English settlements up the coast, including Pemaquid. The following year, a new wooden defense called Fort Charles was built.

=== King William's War ===
==== Siege of Pemaquid (1689) ====
During King William's War—the first of four French and Indian Wars—Fort Charles and the village were attacked and destroyed in 1689 by the French from Castine, Maine. The inhabitants of Pemaquid were either killed or taken prisoner.

==== Siege of Pemaquid (1696) ====
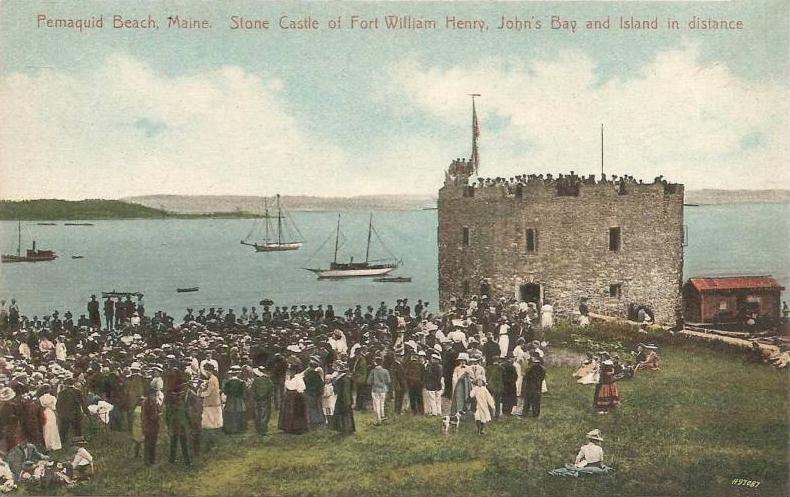
Replica of Fort William Henry in 1909

By 1692, the English regained control of the region, and Sir William Phipps ordered construction of Fort William Henry, named after King William III of England. This time built of stone.

On August 14–15, 1696, the famous Pierre Le Moyne d'Iberville captured and destroyed the fort along with a combined force of French and Indians from present-day Castine. Commander of the fort, Captain Pascoe Chubb surrendered the fort. Iberville killed three of the soldiers and sent the other ninety-two back to Boston. In response to this raid Benjamin Church was sent from Boston to attack Acadia.

=== Raid on Pemaquid (1717) ===
In early May 1717, a sloop under the command of a Captain Carr was captured by ten pirates on a 25-ton sloop (formerly owned by a Colonel Stephen Minot) in Pemaquid. The pirate sloop had come from Monhegan to the south, where on April 29, the Snow (a type of two masted vessel) Anne arrived. The Anne had originally been captured off the Virginia Capes in April by the pirate Samuel Bellamy in the Whydah, which wrecked in a storm on the night of April 26, 1717 off of Cape Cod. The Anne made it through the storm with another captured vessel, the Fisher (which was soon abandoned and the pirates aboard her transferred to the Anne). The pirates arrived at Monhegan on April 29, and waited for the Whydah, for the pirates had not seen nor heard about the Whydah's wrecking in the storm of the night of April 26. The pirates eventually realized the Whydah was lost, and proceeded to attack vessels in the area, including Matinicus Island (which is where the sloop the pirates used at Pemaquid was captured from). The attack at Pemaquid was described in a deposition as follows:

...[the pirates] went after Capt. Carr's sloop, lying at Pemaquid, which they alsoe took a little distance from said Pemaquid, but finding the Mast and Bowspreat not serviceable [to repair the snow] they left her there, and brought the Master thereof aboard the Snow then at Menhagen [Monhegan]...

The pirates soon left the area, abandoning all the other vessels (including the Anne) they had captured and most of their prisoners at Matinicus on or about May 9, 1717 on Minot's sloop.

=== Father Rale's War ===
During Father Rale's War, the location was a rendezvous for Natives and French to return inhabitants of Pemaquid and vicinity that they had taken prisoner during the war.

Colonel David Dunbar, Surveyor-General of the King's Woods, rebuilt the fort in 1729–1730, renaming it Fort Frederick. He renamed the town Harrington after the Earl of Harrington, who had helped arrange the 1729 Treaty of Seville.

=== King George's War ===
==== Raid on Pemaquid (1747) ====
During King George's War, Fort Frederick withstood two attacks in 1747, but in 1759 was decommissioned at the end of the French and Indian Wars.

=== American Revolution ===
In 1775, the town dismantled the fort to prevent it from becoming a British stronghold during the Revolutionary War. The state acquired the site in 1902, and in 1908 rebuilt the tower of Fort William Henry under guidance of historian John Henry Cartland, using many original stones. In 1993, the site was designated a National Historic Landmark.

=== Bristol established ===
On June 21, 1765, the town was incorporated as Bristol, named after the home port of the Pemaquid Patent proprietors.

During the War of 1812, the waters off Pemaquid Point saw the capture of HMS Boxer by the USS Enterprise on September 5, 1813. The town would set off land to create Nobleboro in 1788, Bremen in 1828, Damariscotta in 1848 and South Bristol in 1915. Today, Bristol is a popular tourist destination.

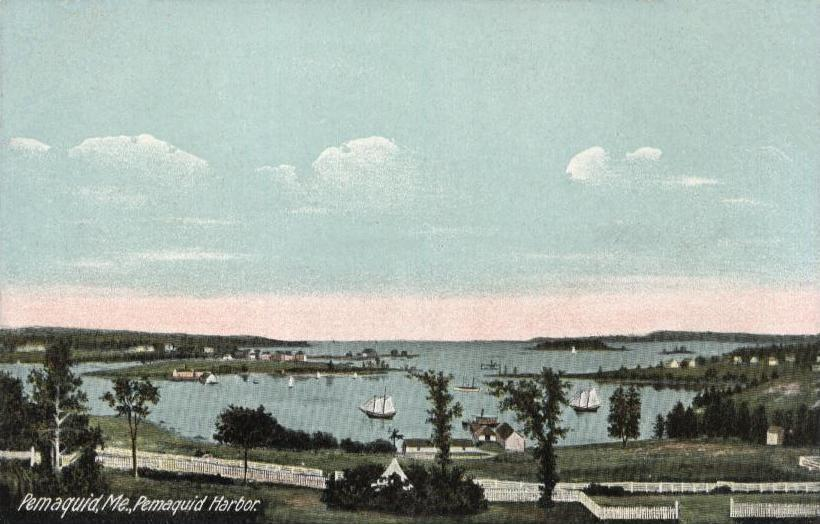
Pemaquid Harbor c. 1908

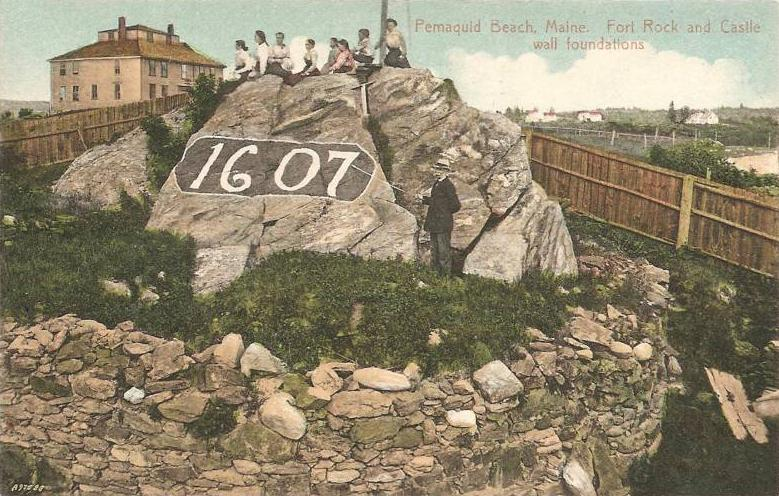
Fort Rock c. 1906

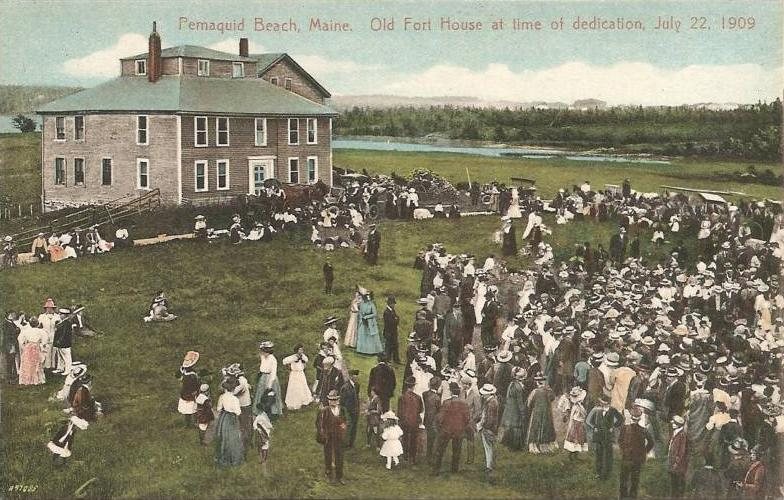
Old Fort House in 1909

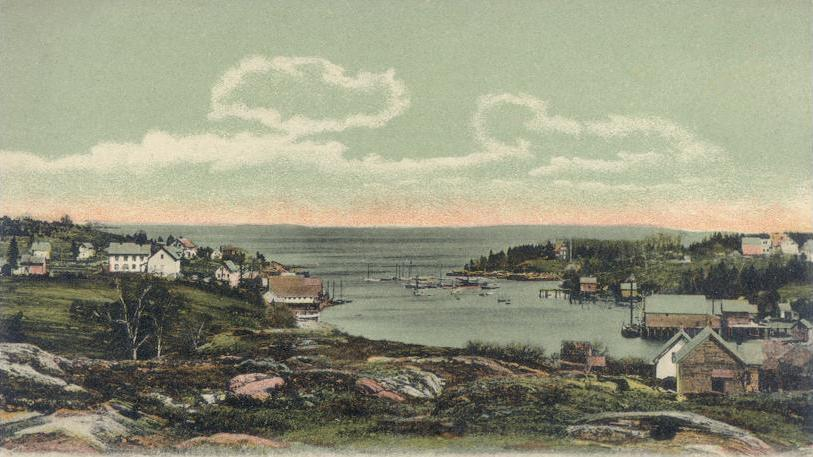
New Harbor c. 1905

== Geography ==
According to the United States Census Bureau, the town has a total area of 78.23 square miles (202.61 km^{2}), of which 33.99 square miles (88.03 km^{2}) is land and 44.24 square miles (114.58 km^{2}) is water. Bristol is situated on the Pemaquid Peninsula, which extends into the Gulf of Maine and the Atlantic Ocean.

== Demographics ==
Historical population
Census	Pop.	Note	%±
1790	516		—
1800	2,062		299.6%
1810	2,753		33.5%
1820	2,946		7.0%
1830	2,450		−16.8%
1840	2,945		20.2%
1850	2,931		−0.5%
1860	3,335		13.8%
1870	2,916		−12.6%
1880	3,196		9.6%
1890	2,821		−11.7%
1900	2,572		−8.8%
1910	2,415		−6.1%
1920	1,419		−41.2%
1930	1,413		−0.4%
1940	1,355		−4.1%
1950	1,476		8.9%
1960	1,441		−2.4%
1970	1,721		19.4%
1980	2,095		21.7%
1990	2,326		11.0%
2000	2,644		13.7%
2010	2,755		4.2%
2020	2,834		2.9%
U.S. Decennial Census

As of 2024, the median income for a household in Bristol, Maine was $100,750, and the median income for a family was $108,355. In 2021, the median income for a male was $34,760, versus $28,669 for females. In 2024, the per capita income for Bristol, Maine was $66,154. About 4.9% of families and 6.4% of the whole population of Bristol, Maine were below the poverty line in 2024, including 5.7% being under 18 years old, 10.2% being 18 to 64 years old, and 2.9% being 65 years and older.

=== United States Census Data ===
As of the United States Census of 2020, the population of Bristol, Maine, included 2,834 people, 1,388 households, and 952 families residing in the town. As of 2020, the racial makeup of the town consisted of 94.4% White, 0.49% Black or African American, 0.1% American Indian or Alaska Native, and 0.49% Asian. Additionally, the Hispanic and Latino population consisted of 1.02%.

As of the 2024 US Census, there were 1,388 households, of which 11% had children under the age of 18 living with them. Additionally, 59% were married couples living together, 11% had a male householder with no female present, and 21.5% had a female householder with no male present. The average household size was 2.09, and the average family size was 2.47.

The median age of the population in 2024 was 61, and the total population was 2,917 people. Of the total population, 13.8% were under the age of 18; 1.6% were 18 to 24 years old; 17.8% were 25 to 49 years old; and 61.8% were 50 to 84 years old.

The gender makeup of the town was 49.2% male and 50.7% female.

== Education ==
The school district is the Bristol School District. Bristol Consolidated School is a part of the Central Lincoln County School System (Alternative Organizational Structure 93).

For high school, AOS 93 does not have a public high school. It sends high school students to Lincoln Academy, a private school. Students in the AOS 93 area eligible to attend the school for free, or select another school of interest in the area and pay tuition there.

== Pemaquid Beach Triathlon ==
Known as “Maine’s most beautiful triathlon,” the Pemaquid Beach Triathlon first began in August 2018. After pausing for a few years due to the COVID-19 pandemic, the Pemaquid Triathlon partnered with Coastal Rivers Conservation Trust to reopen the race in August 2023. Since its start, the Pemaquid Triathlon has existed as a fundraiser to raise money for Bristol Parks and Recreation. The 2026 event has continued its fundraising mission in hopes of raising $12,000 to finish a playground at Pemaquid Beach State Park.

The race is a community-based event, where some participants race to compete, and others race for fun. Participants can race as individuals or in teams of two or three.

=== Course Overview ===
==== Sprint Swim ====
The 400-yard swim rounds two large buoys, starting and ending at Pemaquid Beach State Park. The first leg of the swim is 100 yards straight out to the first buoy, a 200-yard clockwise rotation toward the second buoy, and a final clockwise rotation to swim back to the beach.

==== Sprint Bike ====
The bike route is a 17.4-mile route through Bristol’s countryside and along the Pemaquid peninsula. The route begins on Route 130, east on Lower Pond Road, south on Route 32, and finishes at Pemaquid Beach State Park. The bike ride has an elevation gain of 1,137 ft.

==== Sprint Run ====
The 3.1 sprint race follows the Pemaquid Trail, a quiet, coastal neighborhood, with views of Pemaquid Beach State Park and the surrounding bay. The run turns right out of Pemaquid Beach and follows a flat route, out and back.

=== 2026 Pemaquid Beach Triathlon ===
The 2026 Pemaquid Beach Triathlon was on Sunday, August 23 and had a record-breaking number of participants. 160 participants registered and competed in the individual event, with more than 80 competing in the relay event, resulting in more than 240 athletes. The race raised more than $16,000 for the playground fund.

==== Demographics ====
The 2026 race had approximately 25 more athletes than the previous year, which continued an upward trend over the last four years. Additionally, there was an increase in participation by older athletes.

==== Results ====
The winner of the 2026 Pemaquid Beach Triathlon was Satchel Kim, 23, who finished in a time of 1:13:22. Kim was almost 12 minutes faster than the runner-up.

== Sites of interest ==
- Fishermen's Museum
- Fort William Henry
- Granite Hall Store
- Harrington Meeting House
- Loudville Church on Louds Island
- Pemaquid Archeological Site
- Pemaquid Point Lighthouse

== Notable people ==
- Thomas Drummond, judge
- David Hanna, artist
- Marcus Hanna, lighthouse keeper
- Robert Livingston Ireland, Jr., businessman (summer resident)
- William North, U.S. Senator from New York
- Heather Cox Richardson, historian and author
- Samoset, Abenaki sagamore
- Joshua Soule, Methodist bishop
- Elizabeth Upham Yates, suffragist and missionary
