= Raid on Groton =

Action of King William's War

Coordinates: 42.6293°N 71.5656°W

- Part of King William's War
Date	July 27, 1694
Location	Groton, Massachusetts
Result	French and Indian victory

Belligerents
(Kingdom of England) England: Province of Massachusetts Bay	(Kingdom of France) France: New France; Wabanaki Confederacy: Abenaki; Wolastoqiyik

Commanders and leaders
	Claude-Sébastien de Villieu; Louis-Pierre Thury

Strength
Unknown	250 Abenaki Indians

Casualties and losses
Killed 20 people and took 13 captive	Unknown

The Raid on Groton happened during King William's War, on July 27, 1694, at Groton, Massachusetts. This was one of numerous attacks against the settlement in the late 17th and early 18th centuries. The village had been raided during King Philip's War and temporarily abandoned by numerous families. It was also raided in June 1707 during Queen Anne's War.

During this extended period of repeated conflicts, both the French and English, and their respective First Nations allies, did a brisk trade in captives. They sometimes conducted high-level prisoner exchanges. Some captives were ransomed by families or communities; others were adopted by Mohawk families in the mission village of Kahnawake, or, similarly, by Huron (Wendat) or Abenaki in other villages.

== Historical context ==
In 1693 the English at Boston had entered into peace and trade negotiations with the Abenaki tribes in eastern Massachusetts. The French at Quebec under Governor Frontenac wished to disrupt the negotiations and sent Claude-Sébastien de Villieu in the fall of 1693 into present-day Maine, with orders to "place himself at the head of the Acadian Indians and lead them against the English." In this period, England and France were at war in King William's War in Europe.

Villieu spent the winter at Fort Nashwaak. The Indian bands of the region were in general disagreement as to whether to attack the English or not. After discussions by Villieu and the support of Father Louis-Pierre Thury and Father Vincent Bigot (at Pentagouet), they went on the offensive.

== Raid ==
Villieu attacked the English settlement of Oyster River (now Durham, New Hampshire) with about 250 Abenaki Indians, composed of two main groups of warriors from the Penobscot and Norridgewock, under command of their sagamore Bomazeen (or Bomoseen). A number of Wolastoqey from Medoctec, led by Assacumbuit, also took part in the attack. Fr. Simon-Gérard had dissuaded most of his followers from participating.

Following the raid on Oyster River, "the savages of Pentagoet under Taxous and Madockawando, piqued at the little booty, and the few captives taken," continued to other settlements. Some 40 warriors traveled to Groton, Massachusetts, which they raided on the morning of July 27, 1694. They killed some 20 people (seven in the Longley family) and took captive some 13 others, including three Longley children. Betty Longley died while being taken overland to Montreal, and John Longley was held by the Abenaki.

The oldest, 21-year-old Lydia Longley, was eventually taken to Montreal by the Pennacook, to whom she had been traded not long after the raid. In that city she was ransomed by a wealthy Frenchman who assisted captives, tutored and converted to Catholicism, and baptized as Lydia-Madeleine in 1696. That year she entered the non-cloistered Congregation of Notre Dame. Sister Lydia-Madeleine had most of her career in Montreal but later served as the superior at a mission at Sainte-Famille, Île d’Orléans, near the city of Quebec. In the mid-20th century, she became known as the First American Nun, after a popular children's book of that title published in 1958.

== Consequences ==
After the successful raid on Oyster River and Groton, Claude-Sébastien de Villieu joined Acadian Governor de Villebon as the commander of Fort Nashwaak, capital of Acadia.

== See also ==
- Military history of the Maliseet people
