= Battle of Port Royal (1690) =

Battle of King William's War

Coordinates: 44°42′40″N 65°36′36″W

- Part of King William's War
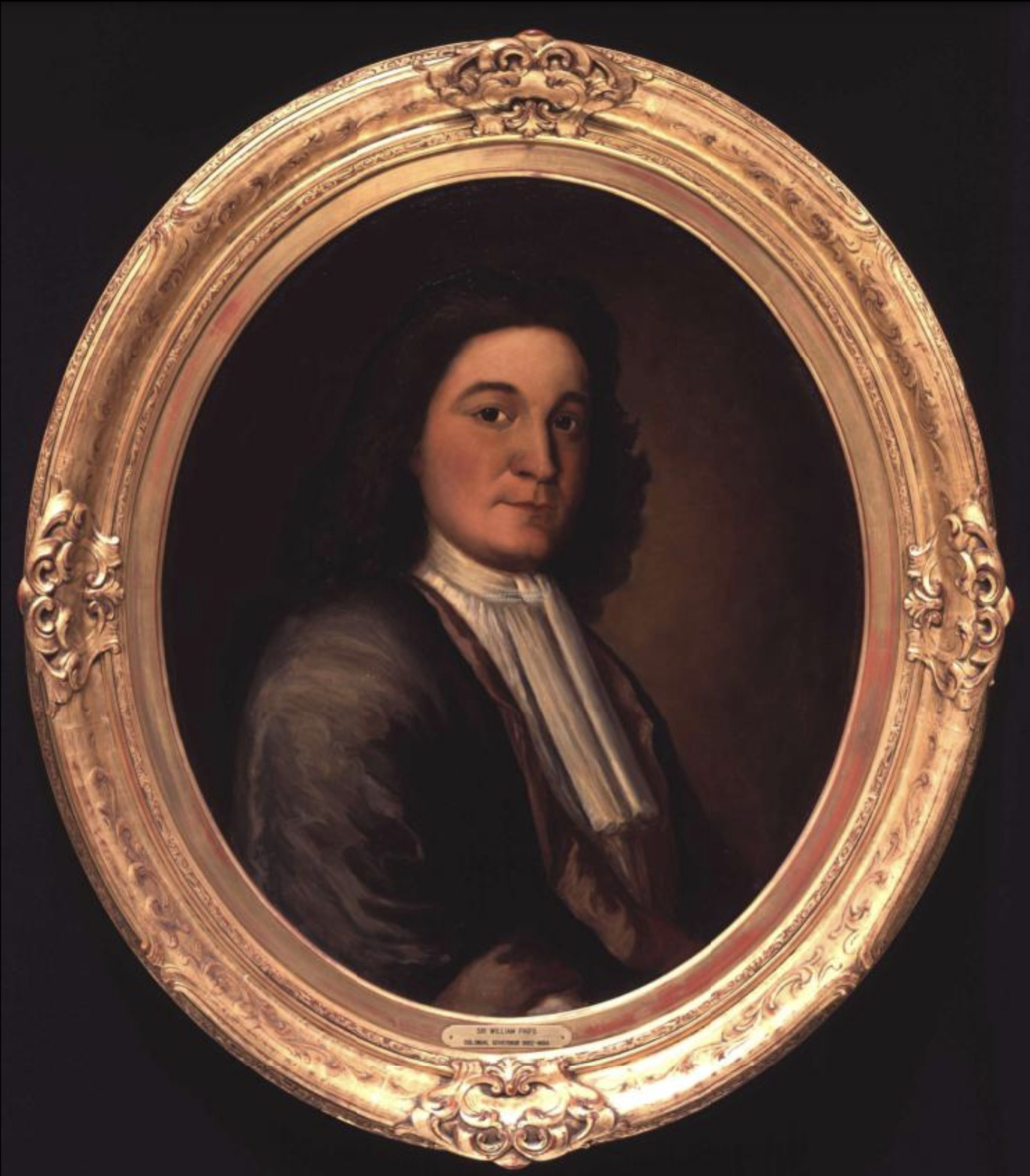
- Portrait of Sir William Phips
Date	19 May 1690
Location	Port Royal, Acadia (present-day Annapolis Royal, Nova Scotia)
Result	English victory

Belligerents
Massachusetts Bay	Acadia

Commanders and leaders
Sir William Phips; John March	Louis-Alexandre des Friches de Meneval (surrendered); Pierre Maisonnat dit Baptiste (surrendered)

Strength
446 provincial soldiers 226 seamen 7 warships 78 cannons	Fewer than 90 soldiers 18 cannons (none mounted)

Casualties and losses
None	All surrendered

The Battle of Port Royal was fought on 19 May 1690 at Port Royal, the capital of Acadia, during King William's War. A large force of New England provincial troops arrived before Port Royal. The Governor of Acadia Louis-Alexandre des Friches de Menneval had only 70 soldiers; the unfinished enceinte remained open and its 18 cannon had not been brought into firing positions; 42 young men of Port-Royal were absent. Any resistance therefore appeared useless. Meneval surrendered without resistance not long after the New Englanders arrived. The New Englanders, led by Sir William Phips, after alleging Acadian violations of the terms of surrender, plundered the town and the fort.

After the New Englanders sacked Pentagouet, the Wabanaki Confederacy retaliated with raids along the New England border (See Siege of Pemaquid (1689) and Raid on Salmon Falls) . These attacks were coordinated from Fort Meductic in Acadia. The merchants of Salem and Boston got up a subscription, and in the spring of 1690 the government of Massachusetts organized a campaign led by William Phips against the Acadian settlements.

The aftermath of the surrender of Port Royal was unlike any of the previous military campaigns against Acadia. The violence of the plunder alienated many of the Acadians from the New Englanders, broke their trust, and made future relations with their English-speaking neighbors more difficult. Meneval was replaced by Governor Joseph de Villebon who moved the capital of Acadia to Fort Nashwaak on the Saint John River for defensive purposes, and to better coordinate military attacks on New England with the natives at Meductic Indian Village / Fort Meductic.

== Background ==
The Nine Years' War, begun in 1688 in Europe, widened to include the Kingdom of England in 1689 as part of the alliance against France. Authorities in New France capitalized on turmoil in the English colonies in the aftermath of the 1688 Glorious Revolution to launch raids with their Indian allies against targets on the already tense frontiers of New England and New York. Two raids in early 1690, one against Schenectady, New York and the other on Salmon Falls, New Hampshire, galvanized authorities in the Massachusetts Bay Colony to authorize a retaliatory expedition against French Acadia.

The idea for an expedition against Acadia first arose in the wake of the August 1689 fall of Fort William Henry at Pemaquid (present-day Bristol, Maine) to French and Indian forces. In December 1689 Massachusetts authorized an essentially volunteer expedition against Acadia, and established committees to organize it, but the urgency to deal with it brought more public support after the raids in early 1690. Several prominent colonists were considered to lead it. One of the expedition's major proponents, the merchant John Nelson, was rejected because of his previous trade dealings with the French in Acadia. The command was finally given to Sir William Phips, a Maine native with no military experience who achieved prominence by finding a wrecked treasure ship in the West Indies. (Phips had survived a raid by tribes of the Wabanaki Confederacy from Acadia when they destroyed his hometown near Portland, Maine during the First Abenaki War (1676).) On 24 March Phips was commissioned a major general and given command of the expedition.

On 28 April 1690 Phips sailed from Boston with a fleet of five ships, carrying 446 provincial troops. His flagship, the Six Friends, mounted 42 guns, while the Porcupine mounted 16. They were accompanied by the sloop Mary and two ketches. At Mount Desert Island they made a rendezvous with the barque Union and another ketch. After investigating French holdings in Penobscot Bay and Passamaquoddy Bay, Phips sailed for Port Royal, arriving near Port Royal on 9 May. Before approaching the town, he made contact with Pierre Melanson dit Laverdure, a bilingual French Huguenot, early the next morning, and ascertained the condition of the town. He then weighed anchor and sailed up to the town.

== Battle ==
The French garrison consisted of fewer than 90 men, and the fortifications were in a state of destruction. A military engineer had arrived in October 1689 and had begun razing the fort in order build a new one, over the objections of Governor Louis-Alexandre des Friches de Meneval, and none of its cannons were mounted. Furthermore, the garrison only possessed 19 muskets.

When Phips sent an emissary on 10 May to demand the fort's surrender, Meneval sent the local priest, Louis Petit, to negotiate terms of surrender. The basic terms he and Phips agreed included protection of the persons and personal property of the Acadians, and preservation of their right to Catholic worship. Phips refused to put the terms in writing, but they were reconfirmed by multiple witnesses when Governor Meneval came to the Six Friends the next day.

== Aftermath ==
What occurred after the surrender, and the motives for it, has been a subject of historical debate, because French and English sources disagree on a number of points. The terms of the surrendered were breached, and the victorious New Englanders plundered not only the fort but the town as well, along with desecrating the fort's chapel. Private property was taken and livestock killed. By English accounts, French soldiers and colonists were seen removing stores from the fort (which would normally go to the victor as spoils of war) while the surrender negotiations were taking place. When Phips was made aware of this, he flew into a rage, declared the agreement void, and permitted the plunder to take place.

French accounts tell a slightly different story. Meneval supposedly did not leave detailed orders when he went to parley with Phips, and some of the garrison's soldiers began drinking. They then broke into merchant stores belonging to one of Meneval's political opponents, Francois-marie Perrot, and removed his goods from the storehouse. It is unclear whether they removed goods belonging to either other merchants or to the government. Since only the "King's Stores" were supposedly part of the surrender agreement, Phips' biographers Baker and Reid note that there is "room for doubt whether the agreed terms would thereby have been breached."

Meneval and Petit, when they reported the events, claimed that Phips, unhappy with the condition of the fort and the size of the garrison that had surrendered, used the action of the French soldiers as an excuse to terminate the agreement. However, the fact that Phips had met with Laverdure prior to approaching Port Royal, and had a presumably reliable assessment of the conditions in the town, renders this explanation unlikely. Phips' biographers posit that it is more likely that Phips needed to have as much plunder as possible. Spoils from the expedition were expected to pay its costs, and Phips made a verbal surrender agreement as "a convenience that could be disposed with" once the surrender had been given.

== Consequences ==
Phips also ordered the Acadian peasantry to swear an oath of allegiance to William III and Mary II of England. Phips then determined to install a new government; he organized a provisional government by personally selecting French Acadian leaders to form a council. The council's government did not last long. Joseph Robineau de Villebon, one of Meneval's assistants, returned to Port Royal from France in June, and reestablished French authority. He moved the capital to Fort Nashwaak on the Saint John River for defensive purposes, and to better coordinate military activities with the Abenaki. Port Royal was subjected to a pirate raid not long after the Phips expedition left. The pirates captured the ship that delivered Villebon, destroyed homes and cattle, and allegedly killed some of the inhabitants.

Phips detached Cyprian Southack, commander of the Porcupine, with orders to raid a French fishing port on the Atlantic coast of the Acadian peninsula. Southack went on to conquer Fort St. Louis in the Battle of Chedabucto. Phips returned to Boston, where he was chosen to lead a larger expedition against Quebec later that year, which was a disastrous failure. Phips retained his popularity in New England, and was appointed governor of the Province of Massachusetts Bay in 1692 by King William. He continued to be involved in the war until he was recalled in late 1694.

The expedition marked the climax of a period of steadily worsening relations between New Englanders and the French imperial authorities, and reconfigured relations between New England and Acadia. Trade was affected, since those who wanted profitable trade with the Mi'kmaq and Acadians, led by John Nelson, failed to gain control of the expedition. The following year, after the English lost a naval battle off St. John, Villebon tried unsuccessfully to negotiate the freedom of 60 French prisoners taken in the siege.

== Sources ==
Primary

- Major Thomas Savage's account

Secondary

- Baker, Emerson W; Reid, John G (1998). The New England Knight: Sir William Phips, 1651–1695. Toronto: University of Toronto Press. ISBN 978-0-8020-0925-8. OCLC 222435560.
- Calnek, William (1897). History of the County of Annapolis. William Briggs. p. 39. OCLC 3227732.
- Faragher, John Mack (2005). A Great and Noble Scheme. New York: W. W. Norton. ISBN 978-0-393-05135-3. OCLC 217980421.
- Griffiths, N.E.S. (2005). From Migrant to Acadian: A North American Border People, 1604-1755. McGill-Queen's University Press. ISBN 978-0-7735-2699-0.
- Lounsberry, Alice (1941). Sir William Phips. New York: Charles Scribner's Sons. OCLC 3040370.
- Plank, Geoffrey (2001). An Unsettled Conquest. Philadelphia: University of Pennsylvania Press. ISBN 978-0-8122-1869-5. OCLC 424128960.
