= Naval battle off St. John =

Naval battle off St. John may refer to:

- Naval battle off St. John (1691)
- Naval battle off St. John (1696)
