= Raid on Wells (1692) =

Action of King William's War

Coordinates: 43°19′20″N 70°34′50″W

- Part of King William's War
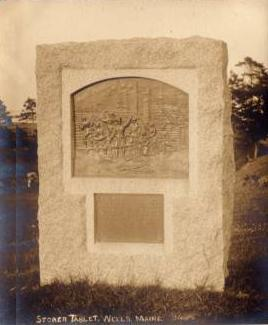
- Storer Tablet, which marks the Storer garrison site
Date	June 10–13, 1692
Location	Wells, Maine
Result	English victory

Belligerents
New France; Abenaki; Mi'kmaq militia	New England

Commanders and leaders
Sr. de la Broquerie (La Brognerie. Labocree) †; Sr. de Portneuf; Baron de St Castin; Father Jean Baudoin	Captain James Converse; Joseph Storer

Strength
c. 400 troops and warriors	31 troops

Casualties and losses
Unknown	Unknown

The Raid on Wells occurred during King William's War when French and Wabanaki Confederacy forces from New France attacked the English settlement at Wells, Maine, a frontier town on the coast below Acadia. The principal attack (1692) was led by La Brognerie, who was killed. Commander of the garrison, Captain James Converse, successfully repelled the raid despite being greatly outnumbered.

== Historical context ==
Wells was the resilient northeastern frontier of English settlement. Other early attempts to colonize Maine above Wells, including the Popham Colony in 1607, and Pejepscot (now Brunswick) in 1628, were abandoned except for a few forts and garrisons. Beginning with King Philip's War in 1675, Native American attacks destroyed many incipient towns. New France resented encroachment by New England in territory it considered its own, and used the Abenaki inhabitants to impede English settlement.

During King William's War, when Wells contained about 80 houses and log cabins strung along the Post Road, the town was attacked on June 9, 1691, by about 200 Native Americans commanded by the sachem Moxus. But Captain James Converse and his militia successfully defended Lieutenant Joseph Storer's garrison, which was surrounded by a gated palisade. Another sachem, Madockawando, threatened to return the next year "and have the dog Converse out of his den".

As the natives withdrew, they went to York off Cape Neddick and boarded a vessel and killed most of the crew. They also burned a hamlet.

== Raid ==
A year passed when cattle, frightened and some wounded, suddenly ran into the town from their pastures. It was a recognized sign that a Native American attack was imminent, so residents sought refuge. On June 10, 1692, a force of 400 Native Americans and some French troops commanded by La Brognerie marched into Wells, knowing that Converse would be in Storer's garrison. But with a 15 soldier militia and an approximate number of townsfolk, Converse resisted assaults during a 2–3 day siege. The attackers alternated between attacks on the village and the narrow harbor, where Captain Samuel Storer, James Gooch and 14 soldiers, sent as reinforcements, were aboard two sloops and a shallop. Native Americans shot flaming arrows onto the boats, but the crews extinguished the fires. The attackers fastened a wall of vertical planks to the back of a cart, then pushed it toward the vessels at low tide. La Brognerie and 26 French and Native Americans huddled behind the shield, but the cart got stuck in mudflats within 50 feet of the nearest boat. When La Brognerie struggled to lift the wheel, he was shot through the head. The remainder ran, some dropping in the hail of bullets. Next they towed downstream a raft of about 18–20 feet square and covered with combustible material, expecting the ebbing tide to carry it ablaze to the boats. But the wind shifted and the raft drifted to the opposite shore.

Running out of ammunition, the attackers retreated, although not before burning the church and a few empty houses, shooting all the cattle they could find, and torturing to death John Diamond, who had been captured at the outset trying to escape the boats for the fort. They left behind some of their dead, including La Brognerie. The victory of so few against so many brought Converse fame and advancement. A granite monument in Storer Park now marks the site of Lieutenant Storer's garrison.

== Afterward ==
During Queen Anne's War, the town was attacked on August 10, 1703, when 39 inhabitants were slain or abducted, with many more wounded. Rebuilt houses and barns were again burned.

The final Wabanaki attack in Maine during the war also happened against Wells (1712). The natives raided a wedding party, where they killed three and, briefly, took one prisoner.

The Treaty of Portsmouth in 1713 brought peace between the Indians and English, but it wouldn't last. In at the outbreak of Father Rale's War, the Abenaki village of Norridgewock began a campaign against the English settlements on the New England/ Acadia border. Then on August 23, 1724, a Massachusetts militia of 208 soldiers traveled up the Kennebec River and destroyed Norridgewock. The region became less dangerous, and after the Battle of Louisburg in 1745, Wabanaki Confederacy incursions ceased altogether.
