= Naval battle off St. John (1696) =

Battle of King William's War

Coordinates: 45°16′23.9″N 66°3′47.9″W

- Part of the King William's War
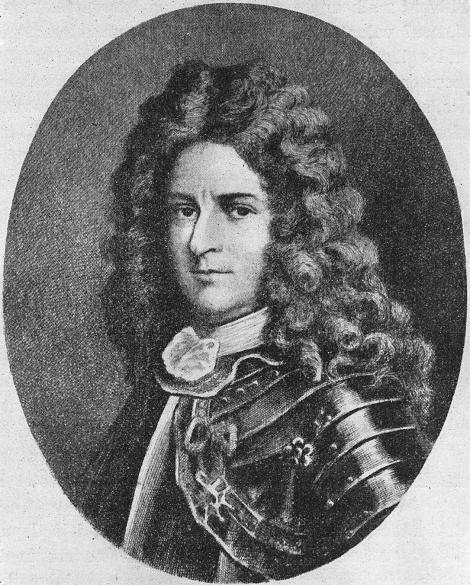
- Pierre Le Moyne d'Iberville
Date	14 July 1696
Location	Bay of Fundy, off present-day Saint John, New Brunswick
Result	French victory

Belligerents
England	France

Commanders and leaders
(Kingdom of England) Captain Eames, Captain Paxen	(Kingdom of France) Pierre Le Moyne d'Iberville

Strength
2 frigates 1 tender	2 ships of the line

Casualties and losses
1 frigate captured	None

The Naval battle off St. John took place on July 14, 1696, between France and England toward the end of King William's War in the Bay of Fundy off present-day Saint John, New Brunswick. The English ships were sent from Boston to interrupt the supplies being taken by French officer Pierre Le Moyne d'Iberville from Quebec to the capital of Acadia, Fort Nashwaak (Fredericton, New Brunswick) on the Saint John River. The French ships of war Envieux and Profond captured the English frigate Newport ( 24 guns), while the English frigate Sorlings (34 guns) and a provincial tender escaped.

== Background ==
In 1696, King William's war was in its seventh year. D'Iberville was about to be engaged in the Siege of Pemaquid (1696), the New England stronghold in present-day Maine. D'Iberville sailed from Rochefort, Charente-Maritime to Quebec City, where he took on board eighty troops and Canadians; then proceeded to Havre à l'Anglois (future site of Louisbourg), Cape Breton and embarked thirty Mi'kmaq, and departed for the St. John River. While at nearby Baie des Espagnols, D'Iberville heard two English vessels were in the Bay of Fundy and decided to attempt to capture them.

On July 5, 140 natives (Mi'kmaq and Maliseet), with Jacques Testard de Montigny and Chevalier, from their location of Manawoganish island, ambushed the crews of four English vessels. Some of the English were coming ashore in a long boat to get firewood. A native killed five of the nine men in the boat. The Mi'kmaq burned the vessel under the direction of Father Florentine (missionary to the Micmacs at Chignectou).

== Battle ==
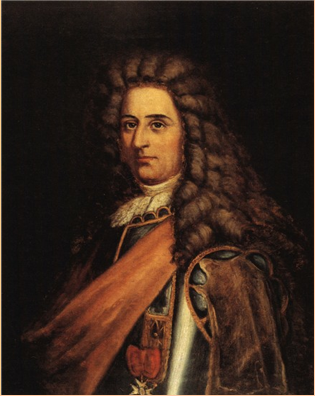
Jacques Testard de Montigny (1663-1737)

On the 14 July, five leagues from St. John River, D'Iberville cast anchor in the fog. At 2:00 the fog began to clear and the French ships could see the three English vessels to windward, bearing directly for the river St. John. When they were one league off, the English observed the French vessels, and bore down on them.

Commander Simon-Pierre Denys de Bonaventure, captain of the French ship Profond masked her warlike character, keeping her ports closed until within musket shot. Both English vessels opened fire on the French ships. Bonaventure opened the ports on the Profond and the English ships kept windward, (ticnnent le vent), and realizing they were outgunned, endeavoured to escape. The Profond tried to gain the wind on them, and D'Iberville in the Envieux followed, contending with stormy weather.

D'Iberville, in the Envieux, fired upon the English frigate Newport, under the command of Captain Paxen, dismasting her. The prize falling astern, came almost aboard the bow of the Envieux, and lowered her flag. M. D'Iberville left her to be manned by M. de Bonaventure, who gave her to Baptiste to take her to the river St. John, at which place he almost lost her among the rocks where she run aground.

D'Iberville in the Envieux continued to chase the larger ship the Sorlings, under the command of Captain Eames. The shot of the French ship passed beyond the chase, but night and fog closed their combat, which had lasted three hours, and the English ship escaped.

== Aftermath ==
On July 15, 1696, the day after the battle, D'Iberville entered Saint John Harbour. After discharging stores for capital of Acadia at Fort Nashwaak, D'Iberville took on board 50 more Mi'kmaq and Pere Simon on August 2, 1696, set sail for Penobscot (present-day Castine, Maine). While at St. John he repaired the Newport and added the ship to his fleet. At Penobscot, where they arrived August 7, they found Villieu and Montigny with 25 Canadians, Thury [Father], St. Castin [Sr.] and three hundred Indians waiting for them. On 14 August, D'Iberville led them all in the Siege of Pemaquid (1696).

The Sorlings upon its escape sailed for Boston. On reaching Boston the Sorlings found two English warships and an armed merchant vessel. The four ships then sailed east to provide assistance to an expected attack by the French on Portsmouth. The English vessels spotted the Envieux and Profond near Mount Desert but the French were able to make an escape.

== See also ==
- Military history of Nova Scotia

== Bibliography ==
- France and England in North America: A series of historical narratives, Part 5 By Francis Parkman, Chapter 18. p. 388
- Murdoch, Beamish (1865). A History of Nova-Scotia, Or Acadie. Vol. I. Halifax: J. Barnes.
- Hannay, James. The history of Acadia, from its first discovery to its surrender to England
- John Clarence Webster. Acadia at the End of the Seventeenth Century. Saint John, NB, The New Brunswick Museum, 1979.

Primary Sources

- According to Baudouin, who gives these details, there was no one in the French ships injured even by a wound, and he says that the Indians on board behaved well.
- Villebon's Journal
