= Naval battle off St. John (1691) =

Battle of King William's War

Coordinates: 45°16′23.9″N 66°3′47.9″W

- Part of King William's War
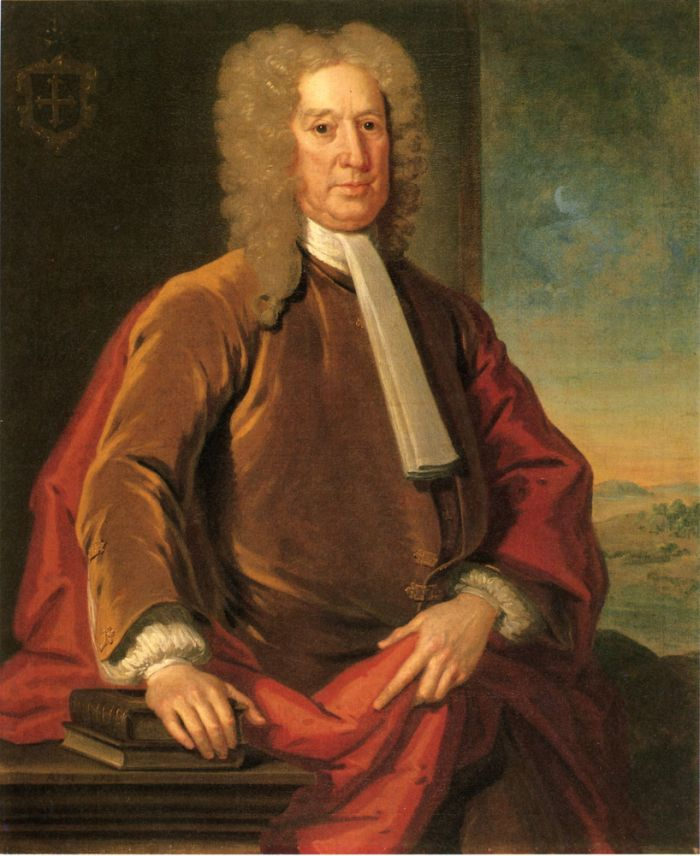
- John Nelson
Date	22 September 1691
Location	Bay of Fundy, off present-day Saint John, New Brunswick
Result	French victory

Belligerents
England	France

Commanders and leaders
(Kingdom of England) Edward Tyng (Kingdom of England) John Alden	(Kingdom of France) Joseph Robineau de Villebon

Strength
Ketch	Frigate

Casualties and losses
4 prisoners	None

The Naval battle off St. John took place on 22 September 1691 between France and England toward the beginning of King William's War in the Bay of Fundy off present-day Saint John, New Brunswick. The English ship sailed with the new British Governor of Acadia Edward Tyng while the French ship sailed with the French Governor of Acadia Joseph Robineau de Villebon.

== Battle ==
Philips had conquered Port Royal in 1690. He sent Tyng in a ketch under the command of John Nelson to be the new British Governor of Acadia. Tyng was in a ketch of Andrew Belcher’s. On 2 September, the new Governor was attacked by Villebon who was in the French frigate Soleil d’Afrique (32 guns), commanded by Simon-Pierre Denys de Bonaventure. The English quickly capitulated. English captive John Alden was sent to Boston to arrange a prisoner exchange.

== Aftermath ==
Alden was sent to Boston to get 60 French soldiers captured by Phips in the Battle of Port Royal (1690). Alden’s son and Colonel Tyng were held as hostages, and Nelson was sent to Quebec.

While in prison, Nelson sent intelligence to Boston about French plans for attacks against the Massachusetts colonies. For this act, Nelson was punished by being transported across the Atlantic Ocean to the Bastille prison in France. In 1702, after ten years of imprisonment, he was released and returned home to Nelson's Island (Long Island) as a local hero.

Alden returned to Villebon at the Saint John in May 1692, bringing with him only six French soldiers. As a result, Alden’s son and Colonel Tyng were subsequently sent to France. Tyng died in captivity at La Rochelle.

== See also ==
- Military history of Nova Scotia

== Bibliography ==
- Parkman, Francis. "Ch. 18". France and England in North America: A series of historical narratives, Part 5. p. 388.
- Murdoch, Beamish (1865). A History of Nova-Scotia, Or Acadie. Vol. I. Halifax: J. Barnes.
- Hannay, James. The history of Acadia, from its first discovery to its surrender to England
- John Clarence Webster. Acadia at the End of the Seventeenth Century. Saint John, NB, The New Brunswick Museum, 1979.

Primary Sources

- Testimonies of Capt. Simon-Pierre Denys de Bonavanture, Ensign Anthoine Gaigneau, and Mahieu de Goutin, April 1692, Archives departmentales de la Charente-Maritime, Admieraute de La Rochelle, Series B, 5906, piece no. 4;
- Charles de Monseignat, Narrative of the most remarkable occurrences in Canada. 1690, 1691, New York Collection Documents, IX : 527
- Journal of Gov. Villebon, October 13, 1691 to October 25, 1692, Webster. Acadia, 32, 36.
- Villebon's Journal, p. 32, 149
