= Raid on Dover =

Action of King William's War

- Part of King William's War
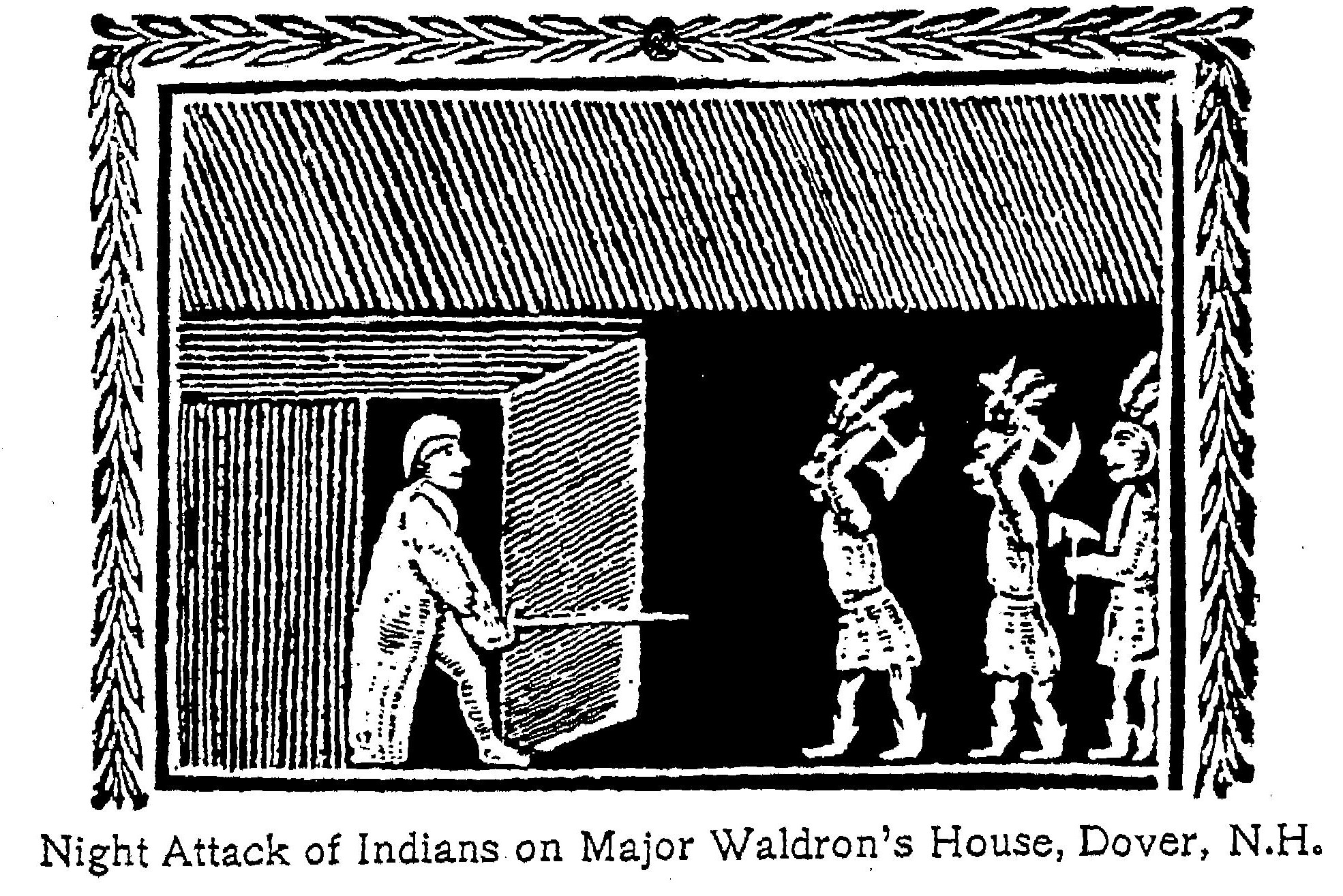
- Major Waldron defending garrison
Date	June 27–28, 1689
Location	Dover, Province of New Hampshire
Result	Pennacook victory

Belligerents
Pennacook	Residents of Dover

Commanders and leaders
Kancamagus (Note: Kancamagus was also known as John Hogkin or John Hawkins.)	Major Richard Waldron

Strength
Unknown	Unknown

Casualties and losses
Unknown	23 killed, 29 captured

The Raid on Dover (also known as the Cochecho Massacre) took place in Dover, New Hampshire, on June 27–28, 1689. Led by Chief Kancamagus of the Pennacook, it was part of King William's War, the North American theater of the Nine Years' War (1688–1697), fought between England and France and their respective Native allies.

== Background and Underlying Tension ==
At the end of King Philip's War (1675–1678), a number of Indians allied with King Philip attempted to flee the Massachusetts Bay Colony and took refuge with the Abenaki tribe living in Dover. They appeared unaware that New Hampshire had been governed by Massachusetts since 1641 and thus they remained in the colony. In response, the Massachusetts Bay General Court sent two companies of militia to the Dover area who then ordered Major Richard Waldron to attack all the natives and demand the Abenaki turn over any refugee combatants.

Major Waldron believed he could capture the fleeing natives without a pitched battle involving the local allied Abenaki, and so on September 7, 1676, deceptively invited the natives—about 400 in total, half local and half refugees, to participate in a mock battle against the militia near Cochecho Falls. After the natives discharged their guns, Waldron and Major Charles Frost took them prisoner. He sent both refugee combatants and those locals who violently objected to Boston, where seven or eight were convicted of insurrection and executed. The rest were sold into slavery, most in Barbados.

Local Indians were released, but never forgave Waldron for the deception, which violated both sides' rules of honor and hospitality. According to Jeremy Belknap's History of New Hampshire, Major Waldron also felt like he violated rules of honor and hospitality.

This action was applauded by the governments of New Hampshire and Massachusetts Bay for avoiding a pitched battle the militia companies expected. Waldron was appointed Chief Justice for New Hampshire in 1683.

== Revenge ==
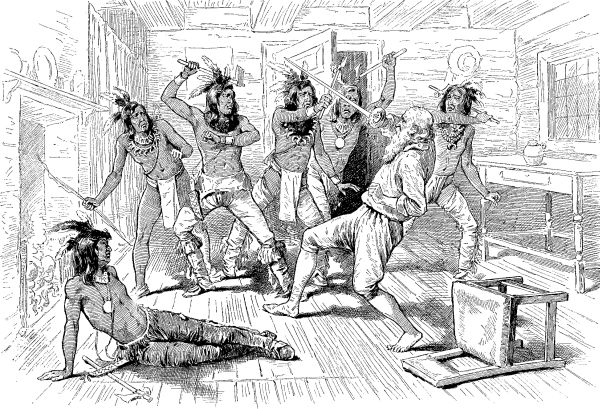
Death of Major Richard Waldron

Thirteen years passed and colonial settlers believed the incident forgotten, when members of the newly formed Wabanaki Confederacy arrived at Dover. Citizens expressed concern to Waldron, but he told them to "go and plant your pumpkins, and he would take care of the Indians."

On June 27, 1689, two native women appeared at each of five garrison houses, asking permission to sleep by the fire, not uncommon in peaceful times. All but one house accepted. In the dark early hours of the next day, the women unfastened the doors, allowing braves who had concealed themselves to enter. The sword-wielding elderly Waldron was cut across his belly with knives, with each warrior saying "I cross out my account."

Five or six dwelling houses were burned, along with the mills. Fifty-two colonists, a full quarter of the entire population, were captured or slain.

== Aftermath ==
Captives included Waldron's seven-year-old grandchild Sarah Gerrish, daughter of Elizabeth and John Gerrish. These were the first recorded English captives that natives abducted and sold in Quebec.

One of the homes that survived the raid was the Heard garrison. At 73 years old, William Wentworth held the door shut by bracing it with his body. He was progenitor of the New Hampshire Wentworth dynasty. His great-grandson was Governor Benning Wentworth.

In the following month Pemaquid, Maine, met a similar fate. John Gyles was taken prisoner at Pemaquid and brought back to Dover, where he reported being in the company of captives taken in the earlier Dover raid.

This was the first raid of many in Seacoast Region that comprised the New Hampshire theater of King William's War. It marked the beginning of what Cotton Mather called the Mournful Decade.

== Legacy ==
The William Damm Garrison House, built in 1675, survived the raid, and was moved to the grounds of the Woodman Institute Museum. It is listed on the National Register of Historic Places.

== See also ==
- New Hampshire Historical Marker No. 282: Native Retribution Against Maj. Waldron
- List of disasters in New Hampshire by death toll
- Raid on Oyster River
- Raid on Portsmouth Plains
- First Parish Church Site-Dover Point

== Sources ==
- Belknap. The History of New Hampshire. Vol. 1. 1792, p. 128
- The history of the great Indian war of 1675 and 1676, commonly called Philip ... By Benjamin Church, Thomas Church, Samuel Gardner Drake. p. 187 Church's book
- Captivity Narrative from the Raid on Dover, Samuel Drake, p. 68
- Cotton Mather. Magnalia Christi Americana, or, The ecclesiastical history of New-England: from its first planting in the year 1620, unto the year of Our Lord, 1698, in seven books (1820)
