= Giacomo Bosio =

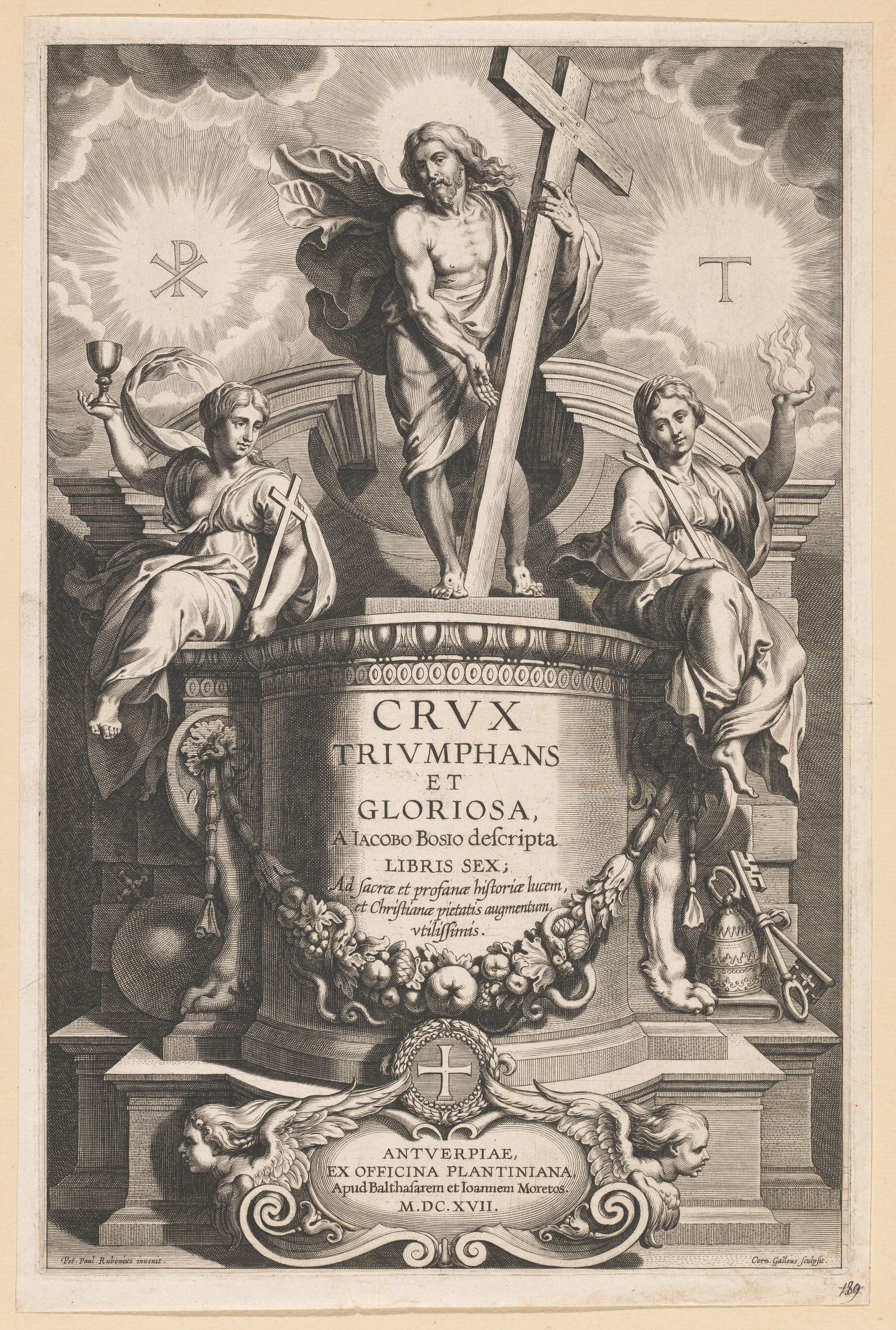
- G. Bosio, Crux triumphans et gloriosa, Antwerp, ex Officina Plantiniana, 1617
- Born: 1544; Chivasso, Duchy of Savoy
- Died: 2 February 1627 (aged 82–83); Rome, Papal States
- Occupation: Historian
- Known for: History of the Knights Hospitaller

Giacomo Bosio (1544–1627) was a brother of the Order of St. John of Jerusalem and the historian of this order. He was the uncle of the Maltese antiquary Antonio Bosio.

== Biography ==
Giacomo Bosio was born in 1544 in Chivasso, in the present province of Turin in the Piedmont. He was a son of a noble family from Milan that had already contributed many knights to the Order. Giacomo Bosio arrived at Rome in 1587 and was appointed representative of the Hospitaller Order of the Holy See to the cardinal Gregorio Petrocchini. He took advantage of his stay in Rome to write the history of his order, under the title Dell'istoria della Sacra Religione, Giovanni di Santo dell'illustrissima milizia Gierosolimitano.

Bosio gave his manuscript to two Franciscan brothers called the "Big Brothers" in Italy, who put his work into the form known today: forty books grouped into three volumes and printed in folio in Rome in 1621, in 1629/30, in 1678 and in Naples in 1684.

Bosio's work deals with the history of the Hospitallers order from its origin until 1571 with Jean Parisot de la Valette. His story was continued by brother Bartolomeo dal Pozzo up to the year 1688 and first published in Verona in 1703 in two volumes, then in Venice in 1740 under the title Historia della Sacra di religione militare S. Giovanni Gerosolimitano, della Malta. Bosio's history was translated into French by Pierre de Boissat, augmented by Jean Baudoin. The Hospitaller brother Anne de Naberat completed the life of the great masters, published in two volumes folio in Paris in 1643 and also in 1659 with portraits of the great masters.

Bosio is also the author of Corona del Cavaliere Gierosolimitano published in Rome in 1588, the Triomphante e gloriose Croce published in Rome in 1610 and translated into Latin under the title Crux triumphans in 1617 and Imagini de Beati è Santi della sacra religione di santo Giovanni Gierosolimitano published in Palermo in 1633, and then in Naples in 1653.

Giacomo Bosio died in 1627 in Rome.

== Bibliography ==
- 1588 - Corona del Cavaliere Gierosolimitano, Rome, in-4°
- 1589 - Li Privilegii della sacra Religione di Santo Giovanni Gierosolimitano
- 1597 - Gli Statuti della sacra Religione di Santo Giovanni Gierosolimitano
- 1610 - Triomphante e gloriose Croce, Rome, in-folio
- 1621 - Dell'istoria della sacra Religione, dell'illustrissima milizia di Santo Giovanni Gierosolimitano, Rome, in-folio
- 1633 - Imagini de Beati è Santi della sacra Religione di Santo Giovanni Gierosolimitano, Palerme, in-4°
