= Lydia Longley =

Lydia Longley (Sainte-Madeleine) (12 April 1674 – 20 July 1758), an English colonist from Groton, Massachusetts, in the mid-20th century became known as "The First American Nun" from a popular 1958 children's novel about her decades in a Catholic congregation in Montreal, New France.

Born into a Puritan family in Groton, Massachusetts, Longley and a younger sister and brother were taken captive by Abenaki raiders in July 1694 during King William's War. The Abenaki were allied with French colonists to the north and west. The remaining seven people in her family were killed in the raid. Her sister died during the overland travel of the raiding party. Separated from her brother John, Longley was eventually taken to Montreal. She was ransomed by a French family, tutored in Catholicism, and baptized as Lydia-Madeleine.

About two years after the raid, Lydia-Madeleine entered the non-cloistered Congregation of Notre Dame in Montreal, a Roman Catholic teaching and nursing order established there in the seventeenth century. She served with them for the rest of her life. She later became a superior in a mission at Sainte-Famille, Île d’Orléans, near the city of Quebec. Her cousin Sarah Tarbell, taken in a 1704 raid in Groton, was also ransomed in Montreal, studied and baptized as Catholic, and took the name Marguerite before joining the Congregation.

== Early life ==
Lydia's grandfather William Longley, Sr., moved with his wife and family to Groton from Lynn, Massachusetts in 1663. William Jr. married and started his own family. The Longleys lived in Groton untouched by any of the Indians in the area until 1676. During King Philip's War, the Longley family was forced to flee and traveled east for safety to Charlestown, a district of Boston. After two years away from Groton, they returned.

The Longley household was a farmstead built on 25 acres (10 ha) in the remote northern part of the small town. Lydia's mother died when the girl was 11. Her widowed father, William, Jr., quickly remarried to Deliverance Crispe. The upkeep of the Longley homestead was a family effort. The children helped maintain the cattle, other livestock, and the fields. They were taught life skills and reading and writing at home, and the boys also received some formal education.

== Raid ==
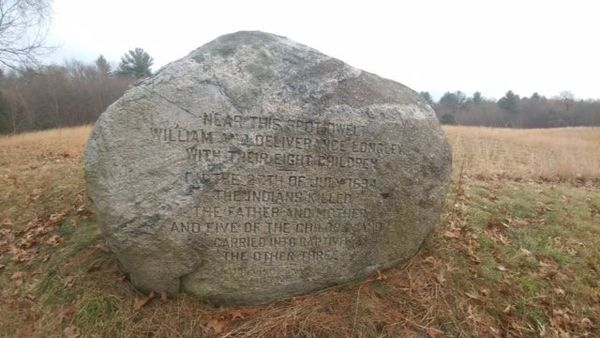
Longley Memorial, Groton, Massachusetts

During King William's War, the Abenaki raided Groton again, on the morning of July 27, 1694. They had massacred settlers at Oyster River Plantation (modern-day Durham, New Hampshire), but some raided the Groton area for more bounty. They freed the cattle from the corral to draw the father William from the house, and quickly killed him. The Abenaki killed all the Longley family except Lydia, aged twenty-one, and two of her seven siblings, seventeen-year-old Betty and twelve-year-old John. Lydia, Betty, and John were considered the right age to be useful as slaves and hostages (not so young as to be burdensome in flight, and not so old as to resist their captors). They were taken by their masters to the north. Betty died along the way. Historian Samuel A. Green suggests she died of starvation, perhaps brought on by the grief of having seen her parents and five of her siblings killed before her eyes.

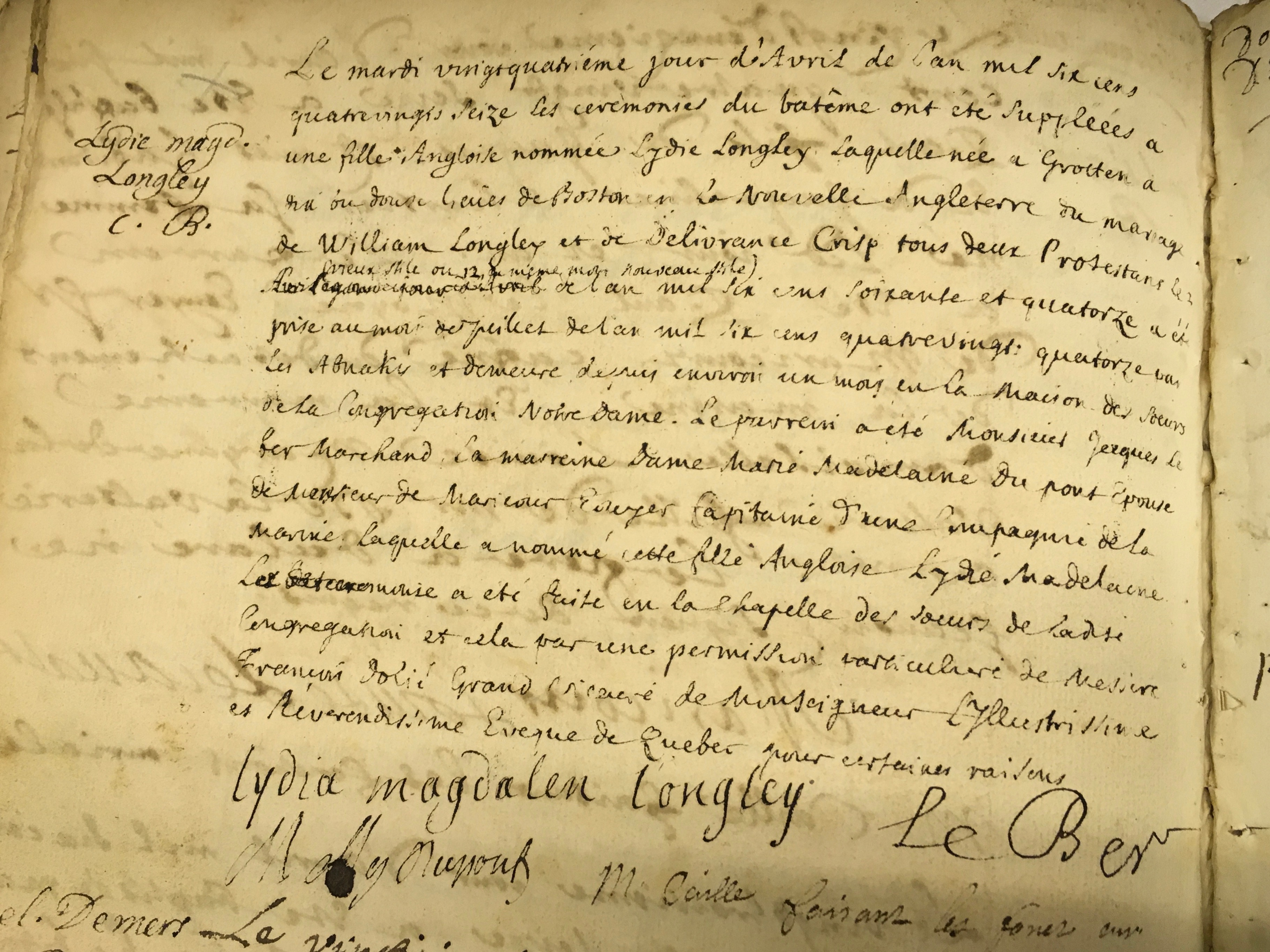

Lydia was soon bartered by her captors as they fled north along the Merrimack River: she was sold to the Pennacook Indians, whose settlement was located in what is today Concord, New Hampshire, probably in exchange for food. Later that year, the Pennacook took her with them to their winter village near Ville-Marie (Montreal). Longley was ransomed by Jacques Le Ber, a wealthy Frenchman who paid to free European captives.

In Montreal, Longley was influenced by the people she encountered. These likely included Jeanne Le Ber, a daughter of Jacques, who was a noted recluse and would a short time later enter the Congregation de Notre Dame as a nun. Longley likely met Marguerite Bourgeoys, founder of the convent, who established it as a non-cloistered institution. Less than two years after being taken from her life in Puritan New England, Longley was instructed in Catholicism and baptized, and named Lydia-Madeleine on 24 April 1696. She also entered this convent, where she taught and ministered to the poor. Although she may have had the opportunity to return to the Massachusetts Bay Colony, she never appeared inclined to do so.

Longley lived in the Notre Dame community for 62 years, mainly in Montreal. Later she lived in Sainte-Famille, Île d'Orléans, near the city of Quebec, where she was appointed as the superior of the mission. Late in life she wrote to her brother John Longley, who by then had been ransomed from the Abenaki and returned to Groton, against his wishes. She encouraged him to abjure his "heretical" Puritan faith and join her in following Roman Catholic ways.

== Representation in other media ==
- Helen A. McCarthy Sawyer published a children's biographical novel about Longley, The First American Nun (1958). She donated her research materials for her book to the Groton Historical Society. A review reveals that certain dates and family data for the Longleys are contradicted by some of the official records available at the Groton Town Hall and in the Massachusetts State Archives.
- Dr. Samuel A. Green, former mayor of Boston and a historian and resident of Groton, wrote a book that included mention of the Raid on Groton and the Longley family: Groton During the Indian Wars (1883). (It is available online at Internet Archive.) In addition, he compiled and edited The Town Records of Groton 1662-1678 (1879).
- Callum Angus, an American writer, wrote a short story presenting a fictionalized account of Longley. The story, "Winter of Men", chronicles Lydia's life as well as that of Jeanne Le Ber and the Congrégation De Notre-Dame. It is included in his short story collection A Natural History of Transition (2021). The stories include themes of gender and elements of magical realism.
