= Pierre de Boissat =

Pierre de Boissat (1603 in Vienne, Isère – 28 March 1662) was a soldier, writer, poet and translator.

Knight and Count Palatine, Boissat began his career in the military. He was one of the first members of the Académie française, and first to occupy the Academy's seat 31 in 1634. Boissat translated Les fables d'Esope Phrygien, illustrées de Discours moraux, philosophiques et politiques, published in 1633 by his friend Jean Baudoin, used by Jean de La Fontaine. He is also attributed with Une Morale chrétienne and Une Histoire négropontique. His home, l'hôtel Pierre de Boissat, on rue des Orfèvres in Vienne, département Isère (France) exists today as an historic monument.

== Biography ==
A knight and count palatine, he embarked on a military career. He was one of the first members of the Académie Française in 1634. He is the first to occupy seat No. 31.

He is credited with a translation of Aesop's Fables, illustrated with moral, philosophical, and political discourses, published in 1633 by his friend Jean Baudoin (translator), which Jean de La Fontaine would later use. He is also credited with Poems, Christian Morality, and a Negropontic History. He is the translator of Dell'istoria della sacra Religione, dell'illustrissima milizia di Santo Giovanni Gierosolimitano (History of the Knights of Saint John of Jerusalem) by Giacomo Bosio, published in Lyon in 1612. It was his friend Jean Baudoin (translator), a member of the Académie Française, who completed the translation and had it reprinted in 1629.

He also produced a body of Latin poetry, including three books of elegies and an epic poem about Charles Martel comprising several thousand lines.

Pierre de Boissat's mansion, located on Rue des Orfèvres in Vienne, still exists and was partially classified as a Monument historique in 1921.

The Boissat family originated in the town of Vienne in the Dauphiné region, where it produced several distinguished members who made their mark in this province and in Lyon. Rue Boissac in Lyon is named after André de Boissat, lieutenant general under Louis XIV and brother of Pierre de Boissat, member of the Académie Française.

A branch of this family settled in Périgord, where it formed three branches (Boissat de Mazerat, Boissat de Lagrave, Boissat de Lajarthe). It is still represented in this region.

Family Coat of arms: gules with a silver band accompanied by six gold bezants arranged in an orle.
