= Battle of Quebec (1690) =

1690 battle of King William's War

Coordinates: 46°58′N 71°16′W

- Part of King William's War
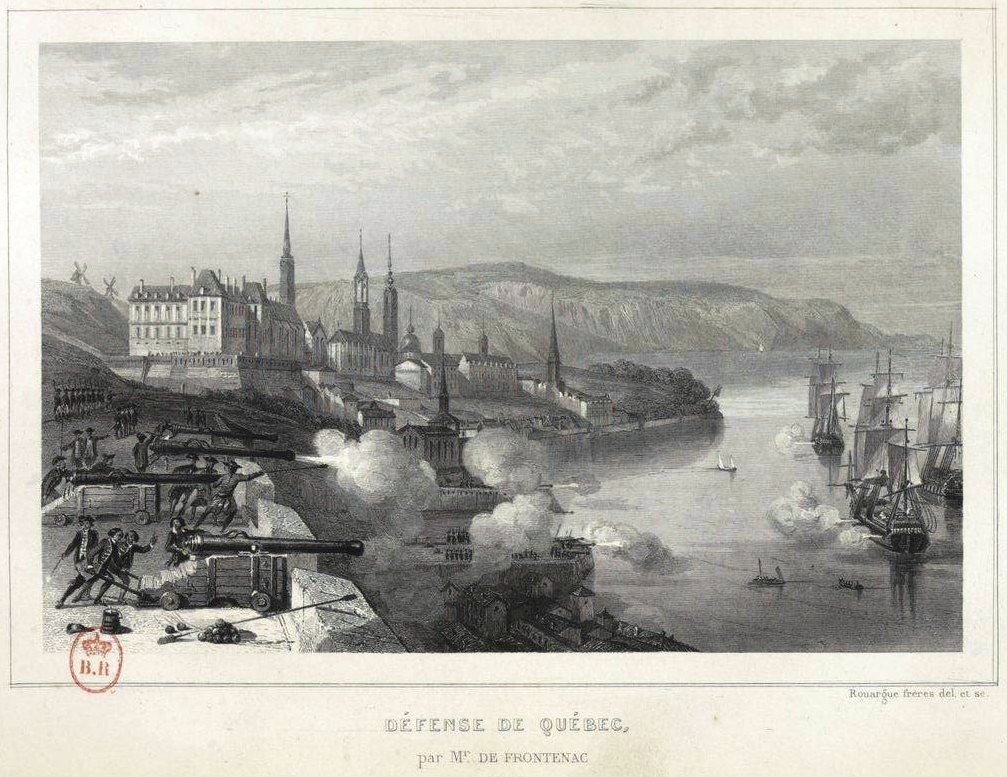
- 1847 illustration of the battle
| Date | 16–24 October 1690 |
| Location | Quebec City, Canada |
| Result | French victory |

Belligerents
| Massachusetts Bay Colony | France: Colony of Canada |

Commanders and leaders
| Sir William Phips | (Kingdom of France) Louis de Buade de Frontenac |

Strength
| 2,300 provincial soldiers; 6 field guns; 34 ships | Marines, 2,000 militia |

Casualties and losses
| 150+ killed; Many wounded; 1,000 dead on return voyage; 5 field guns lost | 7 killed; ~12 wounded |

The Battle of Quebec was fought in October 1690 between the colonies of New France and Massachusetts Bay, then ruled by the kingdoms of France and England, respectively. It was the first time Quebec City's defences were tested. Following the capture of Port Royal in Acadia, during King William's War, the New Englanders hoped to seize Quebec City itself, the capital of New France. The loss of the Acadian fort shocked the Canadiens, and Governor-General Louis de Buade de Frontenac ordered the immediate preparation of the city for a possible siege.

When the envoys delivered the terms of surrender, the governor-general famously declared that his only reply would be by "the mouth of my cannons." Major John Walley led the invading army, which landed at Beauport in the Basin of Quebec. However, the militia on shore were constantly harassed by local militia until their retreat, while the expedition's ships, commanded by Sir William Phips, were nearly destroyed by cannon volley fire from the top of the city. Both sides learned from the battle: the French improved the city's defences, while the New Englanders realized they needed more artillery and better support from England to take the city.

== Background ==
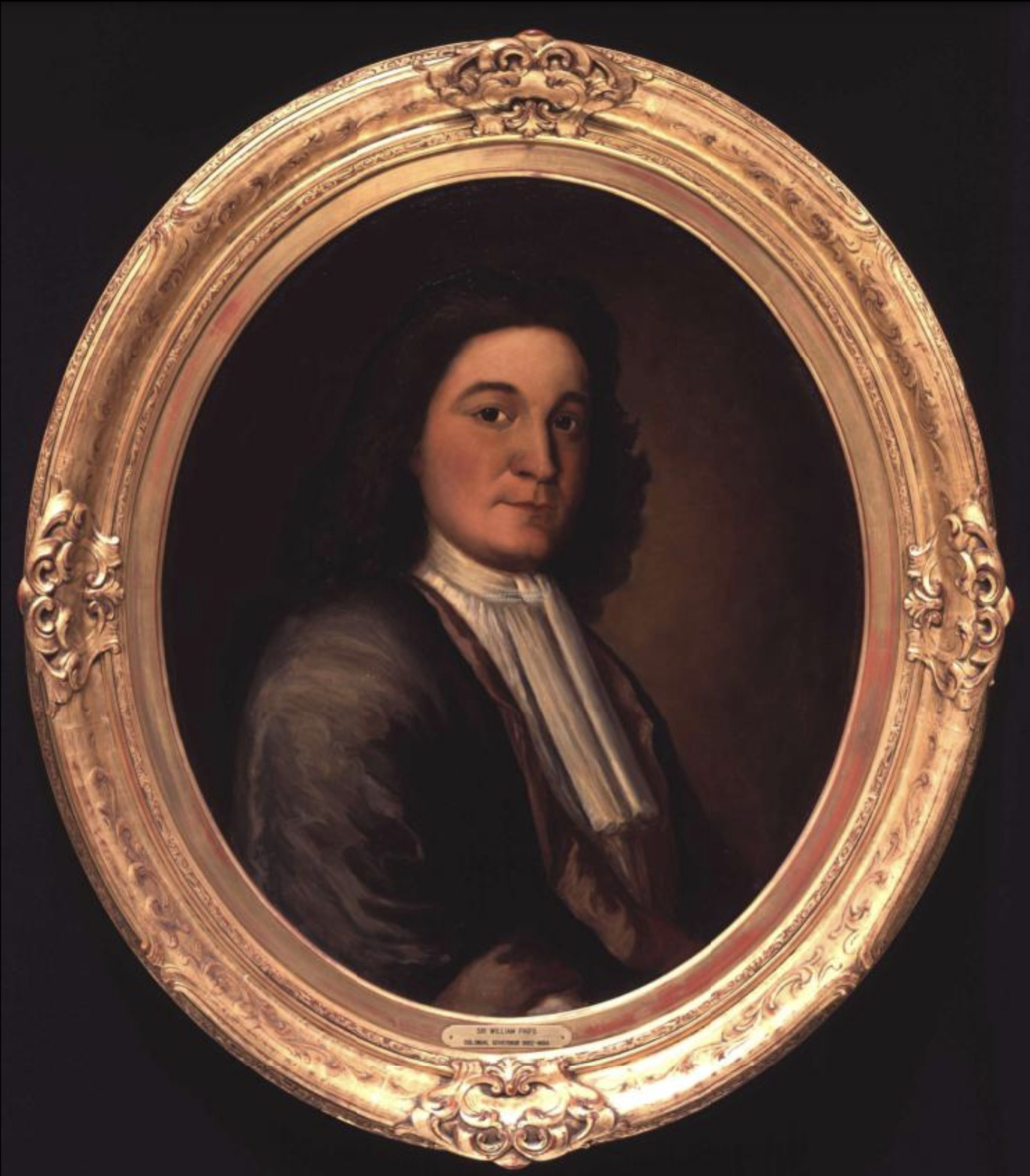
Sir William Phips, who in 1690 was appointed the major-general of Massachusetts, to command an expedition against Acadia

The colony of New France claimed the largest area of North America, although by population it was numerically inferior to the neighbouring colonies of New England and New York. By 1689, there were only about 14,000 settlers in New France, but most of the population lived in towns protected by elaborate forts. In 1690, Sir William Phips was appointed major-general by Massachusetts to command an expedition against French Acadia. He sailed with seven vessels carrying a 450-strong provincial "Foot Regiment", and Port Royal surrendered on 21 May. Its governor, Louis-Alexandre des Friches de Menneval, had only about 70 men, and no guns mounted, and would have been unable to resist. On 22 May, Phips recorded "We cut down the cross, rifled the Church, pulled down the High-Altar, breaking their images"; and on 23 May, "kept gathering Plunder both by land and water, and also under ground in their Gardens".

This shocked the French colonists, who feared that their capital city would be the next target. Quebec City did not have extensive fortifications in 1690, and the whole landward side of the city to the north and west was exposed, particularly at the Plains of Abraham. Count Frontenac returned to Canada for a second term as Governor-General, and ordered the construction of a wooden palisade to enclose the city from the fort at the Château Saint-Louis to the Saint-Charles River. Town Major Provost oversaw the construction of eleven small stone redoubts in this enceinte, which would have protected against cannon. Facing the plains on the west side was the strong point of the landward defences — a windmill called Mont-Carmel where a three-gun artillery battery was in place. The palisade line ended on the east side of the city, near the hospital. The batteries facing the river were also improved, with eight guns mounted beside the Château and six 18-pounders at the docksides. Temporary obstacles had also been put in place on the street leading up to the upper city.

Meanwhile, a mobile war party of 150 Albany militiamen and Iroquois warriors under Captain John Schuyler marched and canoed overland to Montreal, imitating the petite guerre tactics (long-range expeditions into enemy territory) perfected by the French colonists. The expedition was designed to seize Montreal and pin French forces south of Quebec City, allowing the Boston fleet to sail against the capital unopposed. Smallpox, lack of supplies, and disagreements among the officers caused most of the militia and Iroquois to turn back in disgust, leaving Schuyler with a fraction of the 855 men promised by the New England authorities. On 4 September, Schuyler's men attacked French settlements south of Montreal, killing roughly 50 habitants in the middle of their harvests. Too weak to risk a battle with the town's garrison, Schuyler destroyed some houses and livestock and turned for home with 19 captives before the French militia could respond. Thus, when Phips was sighted off Tadoussac, Frontenac ordered the garrisons of Montreal and Trois-Rivières to make for the threatened capital with all haste. Four days later the Governor arrived in Quebec City with 200–300 troops made available by the failure of Schuyler's invasion, considerably lifting the capital's spirit of resistance.

== Arrival of Phips ==
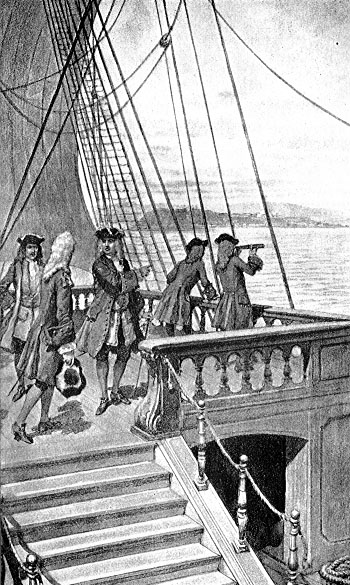
Phips' fleet reaching the Quebec basin on 16 October

While New England and New York dispatched a force overland against Montreal which accomplished virtually nothing, Massachusetts launched a separate expedition against Quebec City. Massachusetts' expedition was financed by issuing paper bonds set against the loot expected to be taken from the city. The expeditionary force consisted of approximately 32 ships (all but four being small vessels) and over 2,300 provincial troops under Phips' command. Its departure was delayed until late in the summer because as the expeditionary force waited in vain for the arrival of additional munitions from England. As such when Phips's expeditionary force set out from Hull, Massachusetts on 20 August it was inadequately supplied with ammunition. Bad weather, contrary winds, and the lack of pilots familiar with the Saint Lawrence River hampered the expeditionary force's progress and Phips' fleet did not anchor in the Quebec basin until 16 October.

Frontenac, a shrewd and experienced officer, reached Quebec City from Montreal on 14 October. When all the militia whom he had summoned arrived, Frontenac had nearly 3,000 men to defend the place. The New Englanders had been "quite confident that the cowardly and effete French would be no match for their hardy men", but in fact the opposite was the case. Frontenac had reason for confidence, as he possessed a force of three battalions of colonial regulars that were superior to Phips's inexperienced provincials. However, the French regulars were not needed as the Canadian militia succeeded in repulsing Phips's landing parties. Furthermore, the city was "sited on the strongest natural position [the invaders] had likely ever seen." Not only did it have impressive cliffs and Cape Diamond, but the eastern shore was so shallow that ships could not approach and landing craft would be needed.

On 16 October, Phips sent Major Thomas Savage as an envoy to deliver a summons of surrender to Frontenac. The encounter has been described as an application of psychological warfare. Following his arrival in Quebec City, Frontenac led Savage blindfolded through the city streets past roaring mobs in order to mask his numerical inferiority. After arriving at the Château Saint-Louis, Frontenac and several of his officers in their best dress listened to Savage as he demanded the city's surrender. Overawed by this "stately Hall full of Brave Martiall men", Savage did his best to deliver Phip's ultimatum. Drafted by Massachusetts Puritans, the document began severely:

The warrs between the two crownes of England and France doth not only sufficiently warrant; But the destruction made by ye french, and Indians, under your command and Encouragement upon the persons and Estates of their Majesties subjects of New England, without provocation on their part, hath put them under the necessity of this Expedition for their own Security and satisfaction.

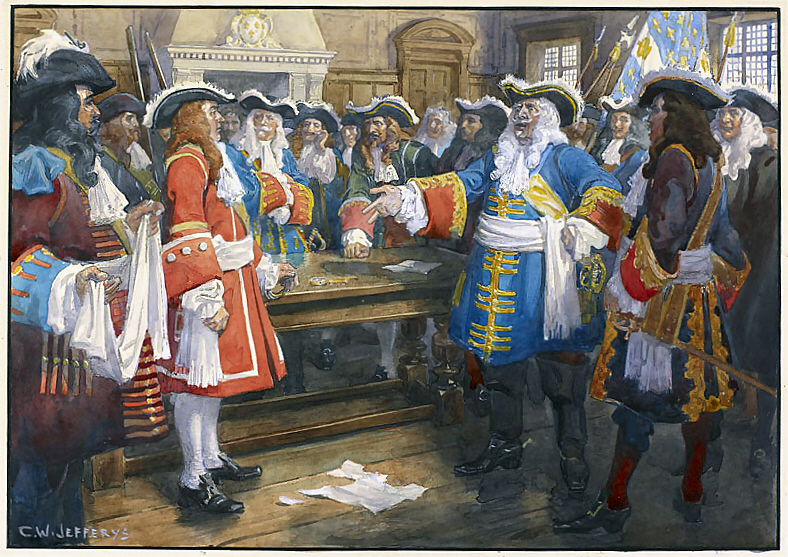
Frontenac and his officers receiving Savage

Savage told the French they had one hour to comply and pulled out his watch. The proud and temperamental Frontenac was so enraged that he wanted to have Savage hanged in full view of Phips' fleet and was only calmed via the intervention of the Bishop of Quebec François de Laval. Asked for a written response, Frontenac shot back:

Non, je n'ai point de réponse à faire à votre général que par la bouche de mes canons et de mes mousquets.
(No, I have no answer to give your general except through the mouths of my cannons and muskets.)

Savage accepted his blindfold with relief and was led back to his ship. Phips's council of war was extremely vexed by the reply, having expected to fall upon a defenceless and panicked city. That evening, drums and fifes were heard approaching Quebec City, followed by heavy cheering from the town: Louis-Hector de Callière had arrived with the remaining Montreal militia, giving Frontenac numerical parity with the invaders.

== Battle ==
The New Englanders saw that the only possible place to crack the defences was on the city's northeastern side, where the walls were weakest. Their plan was to land their main force on the Beauport shore east of the Saint Charles River, and have it cross the river in the fleet's boats, along with the field guns. When the landing force was on the heights west of Quebec City, the fleet would attack the city and land a second force there. Frontenac had expected the land attack to come from Beauport, and the banks of the river had already been built up with field fortifications on the southwestern side. He proposed to fight only a skirmishing action there, holding his regulars in reserve for a European-style battle on the open ground west of Quebec City.

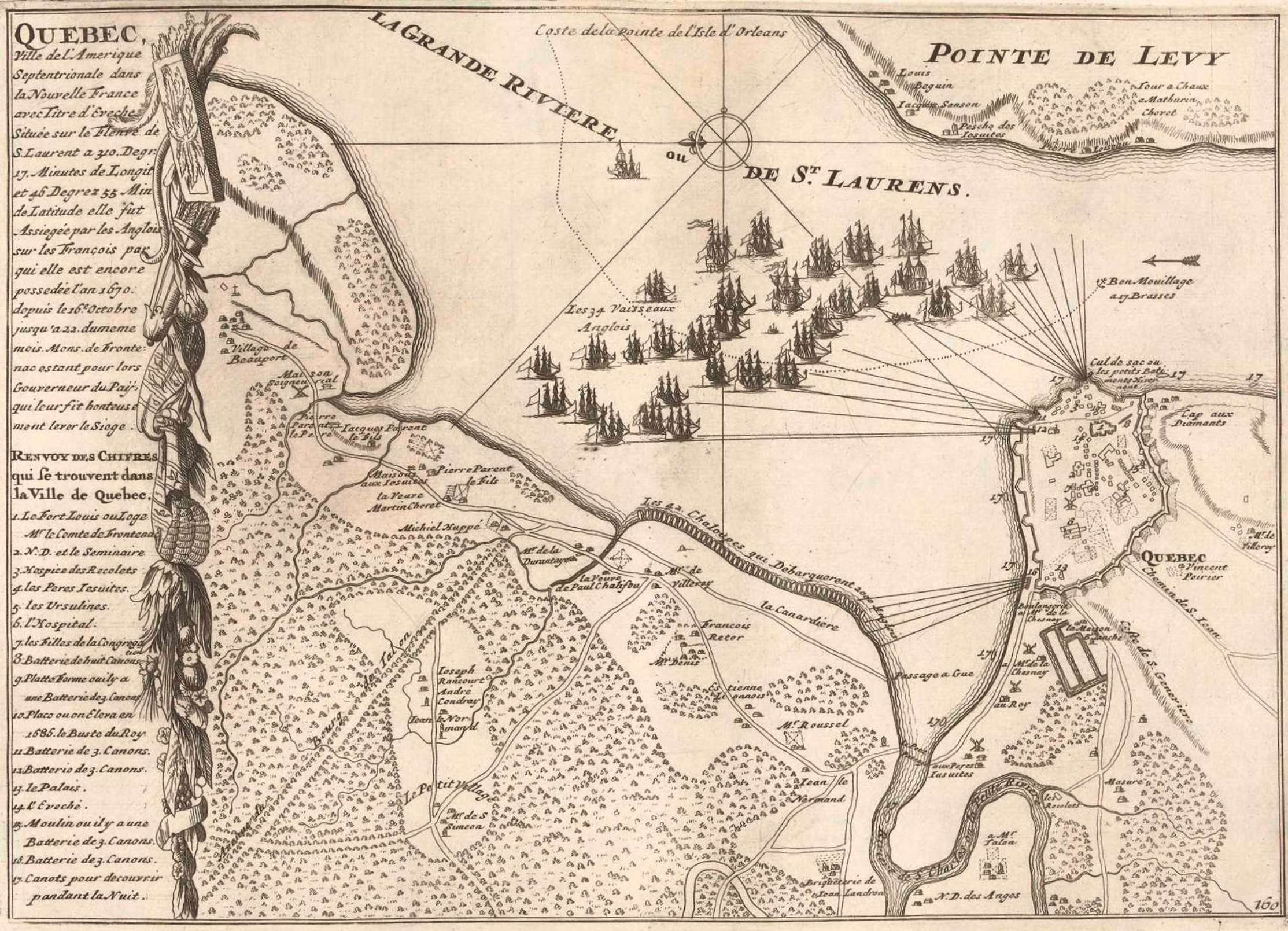
Map of skirmishing around Quebec City.

However, the open battle never took place. The 1,200-strong landing force under Major John Walley, Phips' second-in-command, never got across the Saint Charles. Frontenac had sent a large force of Canadian militiamen under Jacques Le Moyne de Sainte-Hélène, along with some First Nation warriors, into the wooded areas east of the river. When Walley's troops landed on 18 October, they were immediately harassed by the Canadian militia, while the ships' boats mistakenly landed the field guns on the wrong side of the Saint Charles. Meanwhile, Phips's four large ships, contrary to the attack plan, anchored before Quebec City and began bombarding the city until 19 October, when the attackers shot away most of their ammunition. The French shore batteries proved to be more than a match for the four ships, which were fired at until their rigging and hulls were badly damaged; the ensign of Phips' flagship Six Friends was shot down and fell into the river, and under musket fire a group of defenders paddled a canoe up to the ships to capture it. Unscathed, they triumphantly brought the ensign back to Frontenac.

During the bombardment, the landing force under Walley remained inactive, suffering from cold and complaining of shortage of rum. On 20 October, they decided to carry the shore positions and overcome the French earthworks, setting out "in the best European tradition, with drums beating and colors unfurled". However, at the edge of the woods Walley's troops engaged in a skirmish with Sainte-Hélène's force. The landing force proved unable to cope with the heavy fire they came under, and the brass field guns fired into the woods had no effect. Although Sainte-Hélène was mortally wounded, 150 of the attackers were killed and the rest were utterly discouraged. They retreated in a state of near panic on 22 October, even abandoning five field guns on the shore.

== Aftermath ==
On 23 and 24 October, an exchange of prisoners was negotiated and effected, and the ships set sail for Boston. Although Phips' own account of the expedition admitted only 30 dead in combat, smallpox and marine accident claimed about 1,000 more. James Lloyd of Boston wrote in the following January, "7 vessels yet wanting 3 more cast away & burnt." Cotton Mather tells how one brigantine was wrecked on Anticosti; her crew maintained themselves on the island through the winter and were apparently rescued the following summer by a ship from Boston. Phips' defeat was complete and disastrous; fortunately for the French, since food was lacking to feed the large force assembled to defend Quebec in case of a prolonged siege. Phips himself had displayed no natural military talents to offset his lack of experience. However, it can be argued that it was the absence of trained soldiers and adequate supplies that had doomed the enterprise from the start. The governor of New York Henry Sloughter captured the mood in the English colonies when he wrote:

The whole country from Pemaquid to Delaware is extremely hurt by the late ill managed and fruitless expedition to Canada, which hath contracted £40,000 debt and about 1,000 men lost by sickness and shipwrack and no blow struck for want of courage and conduct in the Officers.

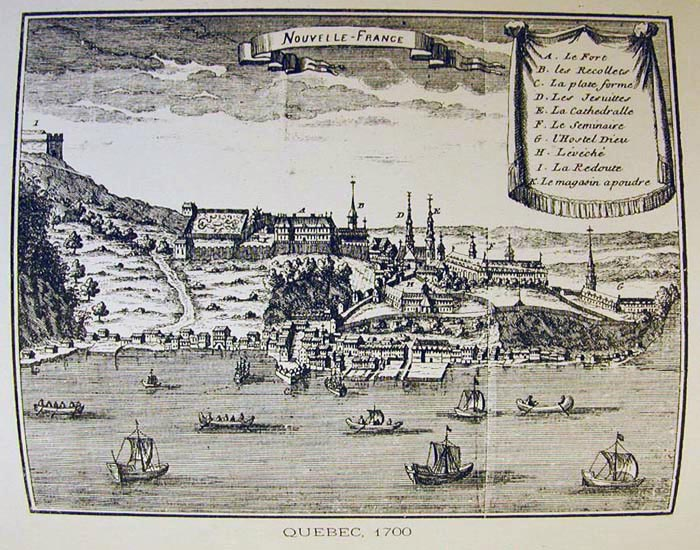
Quebec City in 1700, after the new fortifications were completed. Although victorious, the French realized that the city's defences needed significant improvement.

Canada exulted in its victory and survival; on 5 November the Te Deum was sung in Quebec City in the chapel of a new church that would be named Notre Dame de la Victoire, Our Lady of Victory. When news of the expedition reached Versailles, Louis XIV ordered a medal struck bearing the inscription: Kebeca liberata M.DC.XC–Francia in novo orbe victrix, or "Deliverance of Quebec City 1690–France victorious in the New World."

Jacques Le Moyne, who died soon after the battle, was mourned by the whole colony for his courtesy and valour. The Onondaga Iroquois sent a wampum collar as a token of sympathy, and released two captives to honour his memory. His brother, Charles Le Moyne, won fame for his part in the battle, and he later received an additional grant of land for his services and became the first Baron de Longueuil.

Both sides learned from the battle. The French victory showed the English that to take Quebec City, the cannon of "Old England would have to be brought in". Similarly, Frontenac realised the defences needed significant improvement, and in 1692, he gave Ingénieur du Roi Josué Berthelot de Beaucours the task of designing a fortress that could withstand a European-style siege. This was delayed by the Canadian winter, and work commenced in the summer of 1693 on an earth rampart with large bastions to enclose the city, and pointed wooden stakes to top the walls. A complete shore battery, known as the "Royal battery", was built immediately after the siege. It was shaped like a small bastion, and featured 14 gun embrasures to cover both sides of the Saint Laurence and the river itself.

Although another expedition was launched against Quebec City during Queen Anne's War in 1711, it failed to reach its target when transports wrecked with great loss of life in the Gulf of St. Lawrence. The city's improved defences were not tested until the Battle of the Plains of Abraham in 1759.
