= Claude-Sébastien de Villieu =

French military officer (1674–1705)

Claude-Sébastien de Villieu (French pronunciation: [klod sebastjɛ̃ də viljø]; fl. 1674–1705) was a French military officer best known for his service in New France. In addition to service during King William's War, he served for a time as military governor of Acadia.

According to his own statement, he served for fifteen years on the battlefields of Europe, beginning in 1674, before coming to New France. He participated in the defense of Quebec when it was attacked by New England colonists in 1690. In 1692 he married Judith Leneuf, the daughter of Michel Leneuf de La Vallière de Beaubassin. He led French forces in the 1694 raid on Durham, New Hampshire, after which he was rewarded with command of Fort Nashwaak (at present-day Fredericton, New Brunswick). He participated with Jean-Vincent d'Abbadie de Saint-Castin in Pierre Le Moyne d'Iberville's successful Siege of Pemaquid in 1696. The ship carrying him from Pemaquid (in present-day Bristol, Maine) was captured, and he was imprisoned in Boston. Eventually released back to France, he returned to Acadia, where he served as the temporary governor from July 1700 to December 1701 after the death of governor Robineau de Villebon.

Little is known of the rest of his life. He was known to have difficult relations with his superiors, but was popular with the people in Acadia.
