= Bomazeen =

Bomazeen or Bomoseen may refer to one of the following, named after a Norridgewock war leader who died in August 1724.

- Bomoseen, Vermont, an unincorporated village in the town of Castleton, Rutland County, Vermont, U.S.
- Bomoseen State Park, a state park in Vermont
- Lake Bomoseen, a freshwater lake in the western part of Vermont
- USS Bomazeen, a tugboat of the United States Navy during World War II

== See also ==
- Raid on Oyster River, which Bomazeen, the war leader, played a role in
