= James Converse =

Speaker of the Massachusetts House of Representatives
- In office 1699, 1702 – 1704

Member for Woburn in the Massachusetts House of Representatives
- In office 1680 – 1706 (intermittent)

Selectman in the town of Woburn
- In office 1680 – 1706 (intermittent)

Town clerk of Woburn
- In office 1689 – 1700 (intermittent)

Personal details
- Born: James Converse; November 16, 1645 Woburn, Massachusetts
- Died: July 8, 1706 (aged 60)
- Spouse: Hanna Carter (m. 1689)

Military service
- Allegiance: England
- Branch/service: Provincial troops and militia of Massachusetts Bay
- Years of service: 1689?-1706
- Rank: Major of provincial forces Lieutenant colonel of militia
- Commands: Massachusetts forces on the northern frontier 1692; Massachusetts forces in the field 1706
- Battles/wars: King William's War: Church's Second Expedition 1690; Defense of Wells 1691; Defense of Wells 1692; Queen Anne's War

James Converse (November 16, 1645 – July 8, 1706) was a farmer, soldier and office holder in Massachusetts, distinguishing himself as a military leader during the French and Indian Wars. Prominent in public affairs, he also served as a speaker of the Massachusetts House of Representatives.

== Military service ==
Not much is known of Converse's early military service. In 1690, however, he was a captain on the Maine frontier commanding one of the provincial companies raised by drafts from the several militia regiments. The next year he had to bury the victims of fight at Wheelwright Pond, and later the same year he was second in command of Benjamin Church's second expedition to Maine. In 1691 Converse participated in the defense of Wells, Maine against hostile Indians, and the next year he led the defense of Wells against a larger enemy force. In 1693 Converse led provincial forces in a search and destroy operation against hostile Indians in Maine. At the outbreak of the new war in 1702, the governor made him commander of all Massachusetts provincial forces in the field.

== Public offices ==
Although Converse is mostly known for his military activities, he was also prominent in public affairs; he served as selectman in his town, 1680-1688, 1691, 1694, 1698, 1699, 1705-1706, as well as town clerk 1689, 1691, 1693-1700. He represented Woburn in the House of Representatives 1680, 1683-1685, 1689, 1691-1692, 1695-1699, 1701-1706; serving as speaker of the House 1699 and 1702-1704.
