= Louis-Pierre Thury =

French missionary (secular priest)

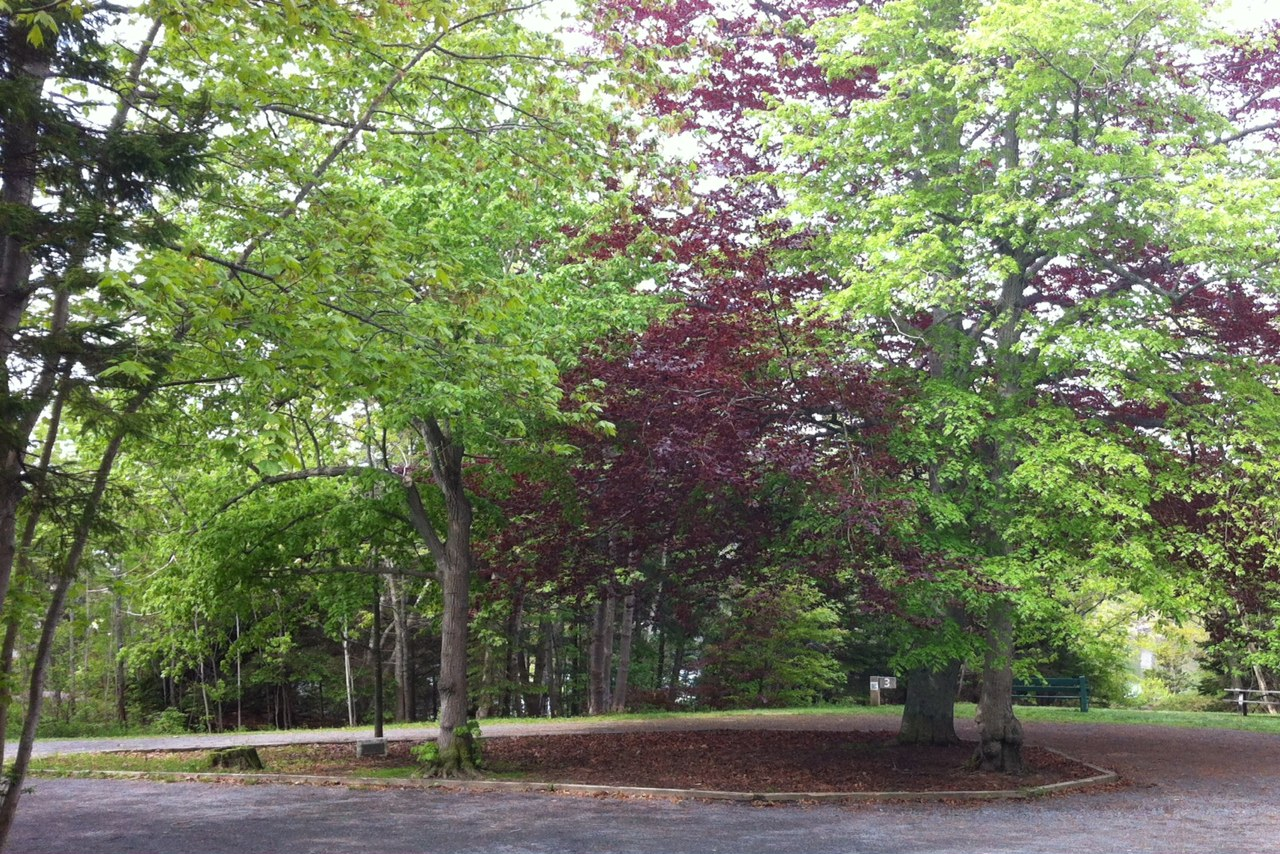
Thury's burial site, St. Aspinquid’s Chapel (Chain Rock Battery, Point Pleasant Park, Nova Scotia)

Louis-Pierre Thury (French pronunciation: [lwi pjɛʁ tyʁi]; c. 1644, Notre Dame de Breuil en Auge (Department of Calvados), France-June 3, 1699, Halifax, Nova Scotia) was a French missionary (secular priest) who was sent to North America during the time of King William's War. He was a liaison between the French and their Native American allies during the course of the conflict, and died soon after it ended.

== Biography ==
Thury was born around 1644 in Normandy, and had probably begun his theological studies in France. He arrived in New France in 1675 as a missionary. In 1684, when the institution wanted to found a missionary in the French colony of Acadia, Father François de Laval sent him on an observation tour from Percé to Port Royal, and chose to settle at Miramichi. Later, he settled Castine, Maine, and remained there for a time. In 1688 Fr. Louis-Pierre Thury, of the Foreign Missions, established the first regular mission at Panawambskek (Penobscot).

In 1689, he took part in the destruction of Pemaquid, after gaining great influence over the Abenaki people. In 1692, he took part in the attacks on the English colony of York (Maine) along with Abenaki and French war parties. He later took part in the attack against Pescadouet (Oyster River), and was present with Joseph Robineau de Villebon and a party of Abenakis at the capture of Pemaquid by Pierre Le Moyne d'Iberville in 1696. In 1698, he was assigned to found a mission between Shubenacadie and Chibouctou to group the Micmac people, but died before this project could be undertaken. According to author Thomas Raddall, Thury was at Halifax preaching to the Mi'kmaq. He is the first recorded missionary in this area. He celebrated Easter with the Mi'kmaq to coincide with their ancient spring festival. French botanist Diereville arrived in 1699 to obtain plants for the royal gardens. At his arrival at Chebucto on the ship La Royale Paix, three Mi'kmaq chiefs greeted him in canoes, declared themselves Christians and showed him Father Thury's grave.
