= King William's War =

North American theater of the Nine Years' War

- Part of the Nine Years' War and the American Indian Wars
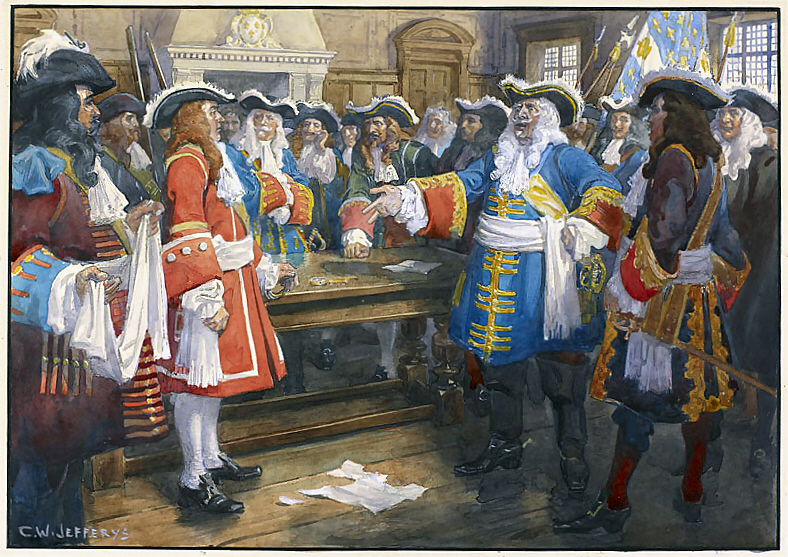
- Louis de Buade de Frontenac meeting with an English envoy prior to the Battle of Quebec
Date	April 1688 – 20 September 1697
Location	New England; Province of New York; Acadia / Nova Scotia; Canada (New France)
Result	Peace of Ryswick; Status quo ante bellum

Belligerents
France; New France; Wabanakia; Algonquin; Kahnawake	England; New England; New York; Haudenosaunee; Mohicans

Commanders and leaders
(Kingdom of France) Count Frontenac; (Kingdom of France) Pierre Le Moyne d'Iberville; (Kingdom of France) Claude-Sébastien de Villieu; (Kingdom of France) Joseph-François Hertel de la Fresnière; Father Louis-Pierre Thury; Father Sébastien Rale; Father Jean Baudoin; Chief Madockawando	Sir William Phips; Benjamin Church; (Kingdom of England) Pieter Schuyler

King William's War was the North American theater of the Nine Years' War (1688–1697). It was the first of six colonial wars (see the four French and Indian Wars, Father Rale's War and Father Le Loutre's War) fought between New France and New England along with their respective Native allies before France ceded its remaining mainland territories in North America east of the Mississippi River in 1763. It is also known as the Second Indian War, (Note: The First Indian War is better known as King Philip's War, the Third Indian War was Queen Anne's War, the Fourth Indian War was Father Rale's War, the fifth was King George's War, and the sixth was the French and Indian War.) Father Baudoin's War, Castin's War, the Mournful Decade, or the First Intercolonial War (in French).

For King William's War, neither England nor France thought of weakening its position in Europe to support the war effort in North America. New France and the Wabanaki Confederacy were able to thwart New England expansion into Acadia, whose border New France defined as the Kennebec River, now in southern Maine. According to the terms of the 1697 Peace of Ryswick, which ended the Nine Years' War, the boundaries and outposts of New France, New England, and New York remained substantially unchanged.

The war was largely caused by the fact that the treaties and agreements that were reached at the end of the First Indian War (1675–1678) were not adhered to. In addition, the English were alarmed that the Indians were receiving French or maybe Dutch aid. The Indians preyed on the English and their fears by making it look as though they were with the French. The French were fooled as well, as they thought the Indians were working with the English. Those occurrences, in addition to the fact that the English considered the Indians as their subjects, despite the Indians' unwillingness to submit, eventually led to two conflicts, one of which was King William's War.

== North America at the end of the 17th century ==
The English settlers were more than 154,000 at the beginning of the war and outnumbered the French 12 to 1. However, they were divided into multiple colonies along the Atlantic coast, which were unable to cooperate efficiently, and were engulfed in the Glorious Revolution, which created tension among the colonists. In addition, the English lacked military leadership and had a difficult relationship with their native Haudenosaunee allies.

New France was divided into three entities: Acadia on the Atlantic coast; Canada, along the Saint Lawrence River and up to the Great Lakes; and Louisiana, from the Great Lakes to the Gulf of Mexico, along the Mississippi River. The French population amounted to 14,000 in 1689. Although the French were vastly outnumbered, they were more politically unified and contained a disproportionate number of adult males with military backgrounds. Realizing their numerical inferiority, they developed good relationships with the indigenous peoples to multiply their forces and made effective use of hit-and-run tactics.

== Causes of the war ==
King James II of England, a Catholic, was deposed at the end of 1688 in the Glorious Revolution during which William III and Mary II, who were Protestants, took the throne. William joined the League of Augsburg in its war against France, which had begun in 1688, where James had fled.

There was significant tension between New France and the northern English colonies in North America, where in 1686, James II had reorganized the separate administrations of the colonies into the Dominion of New England. New England and the Haudenosaunee Confederacy (Iroquois) at times fought New France and their Wabanaki allies. The Haudenosaunee dominated the economically-important Great Lakes fur trade at the time and had been in conflict with New France since 1680. At the urging of New England, the Haudenosaunee interrupted the trade between New France and their western tribal allies through military means. In retaliation, New France raided the lands belonging to the Seneca of western New York. In turn, New England supported the Haudenosaunee in their conflict against New France by raiding the township of Lachine.

There were similar tensions on the border between New England and Acadia, whose boundary New France defined as the Kennebec River, now in southern Maine. English settlers from Massachusetts, whose charter included the Maine area, had by this time expanded their settlements into Acadia. To secure New France's claim to Maine, they established Catholic missions among the three largest Indigenous villages in the region: one on the Kennebec River (Norridgewock); one farther north on the Penobscot River (Penobscot) and one on the Saint John River (Medoctec). For their part, in response to King Philip's War, the five Indigenous tribes in the region of Acadia created the Wabanaki Confederacy to form a political and military alliance with New France to stop the English from further expansion.

== Course of war ==
Map of the campaigns during the war

=== New England, Acadia, and Newfoundland Theatre ===
The New England, Acadia, and Newfoundland Theatre of the war is also known as Castin's War and Father Jean Baudoin's War.

In April 1688, while attempting to enforce English territorial claims, Governor Edmund Andros plundered Baron Jean-Vincent d'Abbadie de Saint-Castin's manor home and village on Penobscot Bay (Castine, Maine). Later, in August, the English raided the French village of Chedabouctou. In response, Baron Saint-Castin and the Wabanaki Confederacy engaged in the Northeast Coast Campaign of 1688 along the New England/Acadia border. They began August 13 at New Dartmouth (Newcastle), killing a few settlers. A few days later they killed two people at Yarmouth in the first battle. At Kennebunk in the autumn, members of the Confederacy killed two families. The following spring, Governor Andros learned about the Glorious Revolution in England and rumors of a similar one in Boston and withdrew back to Massachusetts, taking the army with him. This left the frontier unguarded.

In June 1689, several hundred Abenaki and Pennacook Indians, under the command of Kancamagus and Mesandowit, raided Dover, New Hampshire; killed more than 20; and took 29 captives, who were sold into captivity in New France. In June, they killed four men at Saco. In response to those raids, a company of 24 men was raised to search for the bodies and pursue the natives. They were forced to return after they had lost a quarter of their men in conflicts with the natives.

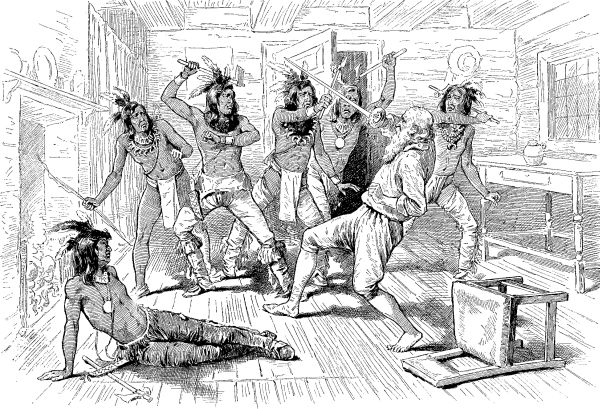
Major Richard Waldron shortly before his death during the Abenaki raid on Dover

In August 1689, Saint-Castin and Father Louis-Pierre Thury led an Abenaki war party that captured and destroyed the fort at Pemaquid (now in Bristol, Maine). The fall of Pemaquid was a significant setback to the English. It pushed the frontier back to Casco (now Falmouth, Maine).

New England retaliated for those raids by sending Major Benjamin Church to raid Acadia. During King William's War, Church led four New England raiding parties into Acadia, which included most of Maine, against the Acadians and members of the Wabanaki Confederacy. On the first expedition into Acadia, on September 21, 1689, Church and 250 troops defended a group of English settlers trying to establish themselves at Falmouth (near present-day Portland, Maine). The tribes of the Wabanaki Confederacy killed 21 of his men, but Church's defense was successful, and the Natives retreated. Church then returned to Boston, leaving the small group of English settlers unprotected. The following spring, over 400 French and native troops, under the leadership of Castin, destroyed Salmon Falls (now Berwick, Maine), returned to Falmouth, and massacred all of the English settlers in the Battle of Fort Loyal. When Church returned to the village later that summer, he buried the dead. The fall of Fort Loyal (Casco) led to the near-depopulation of Maine. Native forces then attacked New Hampshire frontier without reprisal.

==== Battle of Port Royal (1690) ====
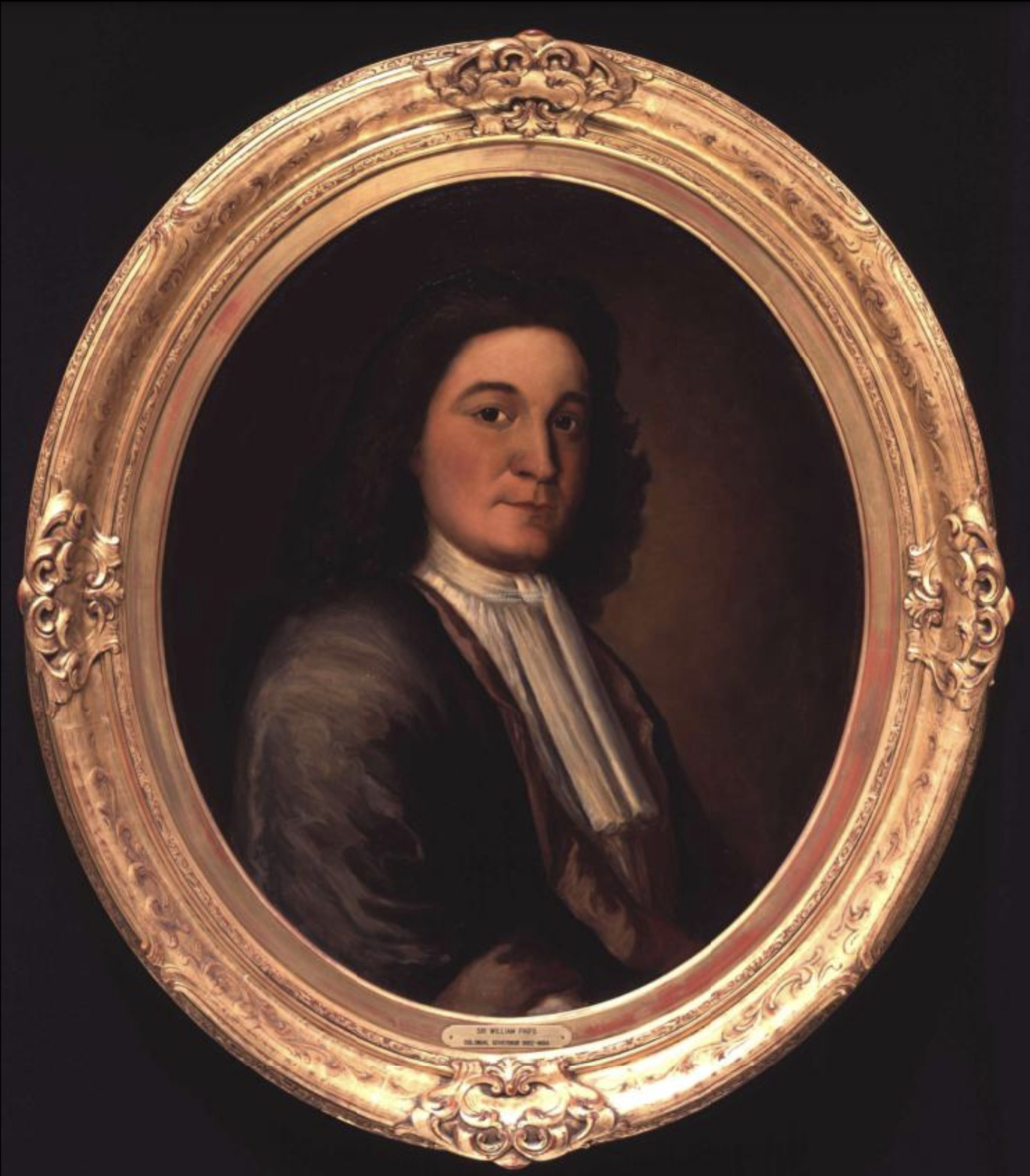
William Phips, the Governor of the Province of Massachusetts Bay, led an assault on Port Royal.

The New Englanders, led by Sir William Phips, retaliated by attacking Port Royal, the capital of Acadia. The Battle of Port Royal began on May 9, 1690. Phips arrived with 736 New England men in seven English ships. The governor, Louis-Alexandre des Friches de Menneval, fought for two days and then capitulated. The garrison was imprisoned in the church, and Menneval was confined to his house. The New Englanders leveled what was begun of the new fort. The residents of Port Royal were imprisoned in the church and administered an oath of allegiance to the King.

Phips left, but warships from New York City arrived in June, which resulted in more destruction. The seamen burned and looted the settlement, including the parish church. The New Englanders left again, and Joseph Robineau de Villebon, the governor of Acadia, moved the capital to safer territory inland at Fort Nashwaak (now in Fredericton, New Brunswick). Fort Nashwaak remained the capital until after the war, when Port Royal was restored as the capital in 1699.

In Church's second expedition to Acadia, he arrived with 300 men at Casco Bay on 11 September 1690. His mission was to relieve the English Fort Pejpescot (now Brunswick, Maine), which had been taken by the Wabanaki Confederacy. He went up the Androscoggin River to Fort Pejepscot. From there, he went 40 miles (64 km) upriver to Livermore Falls and attacked a native village. Church's men shot three or four native men when they were retreating. Church discovered five English captives in the wigwams. Church butchered six or seven Natives and took nine prisoners. A few days later, in retaliation, the members of the Wabanaki Confederacy attacked Church at Cape Elizabeth on Purpooduc Point, killed seven of his men, and wounded 24 others. On September 26, Church returned to Portsmouth, New Hampshire.

During King William's War, when the town of Wells contained about 80 houses and log cabins strung along the Post Road, it was attacked on June 9, 1691, by about 200 Native Americans commanded by the sachem Moxus, but Captain James Converse and his militia successfully defended Lieutenant Joseph Storer's garrison, which was surrounded by a gated palisade. Another sachem, Madockawando, threatened to return the next year "and have the dog Converse out of his den."

As the Natives withdrew, they went to York off Cape Neddick, boarded a vessel, and killed most of the crew. They also burned a hamlet.

In early 1692, an estimated 150 Abenakis, commanded by officers of New France, returned to York, killed about 100 of the English settlers, and burned down buildings in what would become known as the Candlemas Massacre.

Church's third expedition to Acadia during the war occurred in 1692, when he raided Penobscot (now Indian Island, Maine) with 450 men. Church and his men then went on to raid Taconock (Winslow, Maine).

In 1693, New England frigates attacked Port Royal again and burned almost a dozen houses and three barns full of grain.

On July 18, 1694, the French soldier Claude-Sébastien de Villieu, with about 250 Abenakis from Norridgewock under command of their sagamore (paramount chief) Bomazeen (or Bomoseen), raided the English settlement of Durham, New Hampshire, in the Oyster River Massacre. In all, the French and native force killed 104 inhabitants and took 27 captive and burned half the dwellings, including five garrisons. They also destroyed crops and killed livestock, which caused famine and destitution for the survivors.

==== Siege of Pemaquid (1696) ====
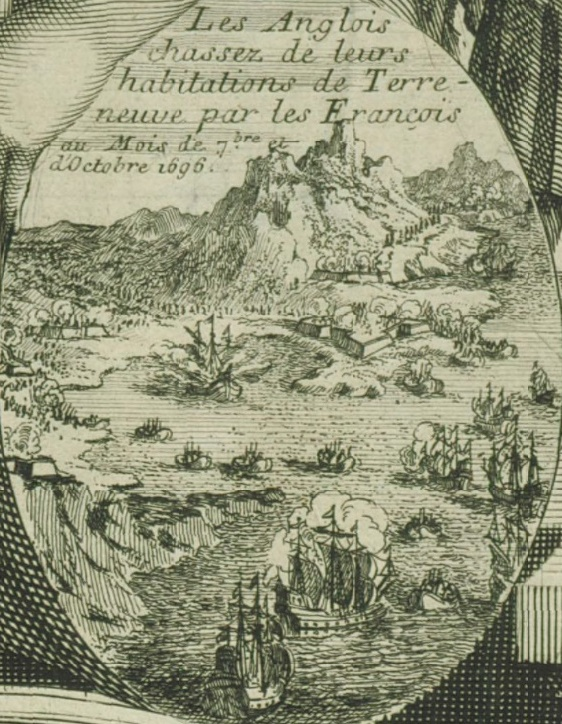
In 1696, a military campaign saw the sacking of English settlements on the Avalon Peninsula.

In 1696, New France and the tribes of the Wabanaki Confederacy, led by Saint-Castie and Pierre Le Moyne d'Iberville, returned and fought a naval battle in the Bay of Fundy, and moved on to raid Pemaquid. After the Siege of Pemaquid, d'Iberville led a force of 124 Canadians, Acadians, Mi'kmaq and Abenakis in the Avalon Peninsula Campaign. They destroyed almost every English settlement in Newfoundland, over 100 English were killed, captured many times that number, and deported almost 500 to England or France.

In retaliation, Church went on his fourth expedition to Acadia and carried out a retaliatory raid against Acadian communities on the Isthmus of Chignecto and Fort Nashwack, which was the capital of Acadia. He personally led his troops in killing inhabitants of Chignecto, looted their household goods, burned their houses, and slaughtered their livestock.

=== Quebec and New York Theatre ===
Also in August 1689, 1,500 Haudenosaunee, seeking revenge for the actions of Jacques-René de Brisay, Marquis de Denonville, attacked the French settlement at Lachine. Louis de Buade de Frontenac, who replaced Denonville as governor general, later attacked the Haudenosaunee village of Onondaga. New France and its Indian allies and attacked English frontier settlements in early 1690, most notably in Schenectady, New York.

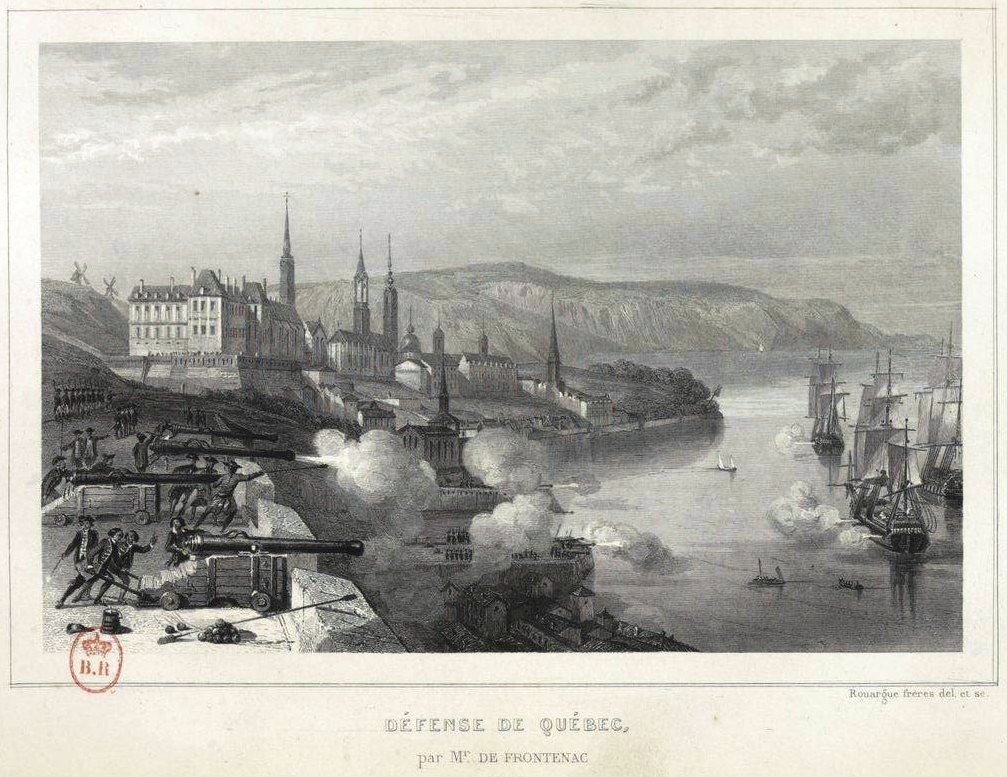
French batteries bombard the New England fleet during the Battle of Quebec.

That was followed by two expeditions. One, on land under Connecticut provincial the militia general Fitz-John Winthrop, targeted Montreal; the other, led by Sir William Phips, targeted Quebec. Winthrop's expedition failed because of disease and supply issues, and Phips was defeated in the Battle of Quebec. The Quebec and Port Royal expeditions were the only major New England offensives of King William's War; for the remainder of the war, the English colonists were engaged primarily in defensive operations, skirmishes, and retaliatory raids.

The Haudenosaunee Five Nations suffered from the weakness of their English allies. In 1693 and 1696, the French and their Indian allies ravaged Haudenosaunee towns and destroyed crops while New York colonists remained passive. After England and France made peace in 1697, the Haudenosaunee, now abandoned by the English colonists, remained at war with New France until 1701, when a peace was agreed at Montreal between New France and a large number of Haudenosaunee and other tribes.

=== Hudson Bay Theatre ===
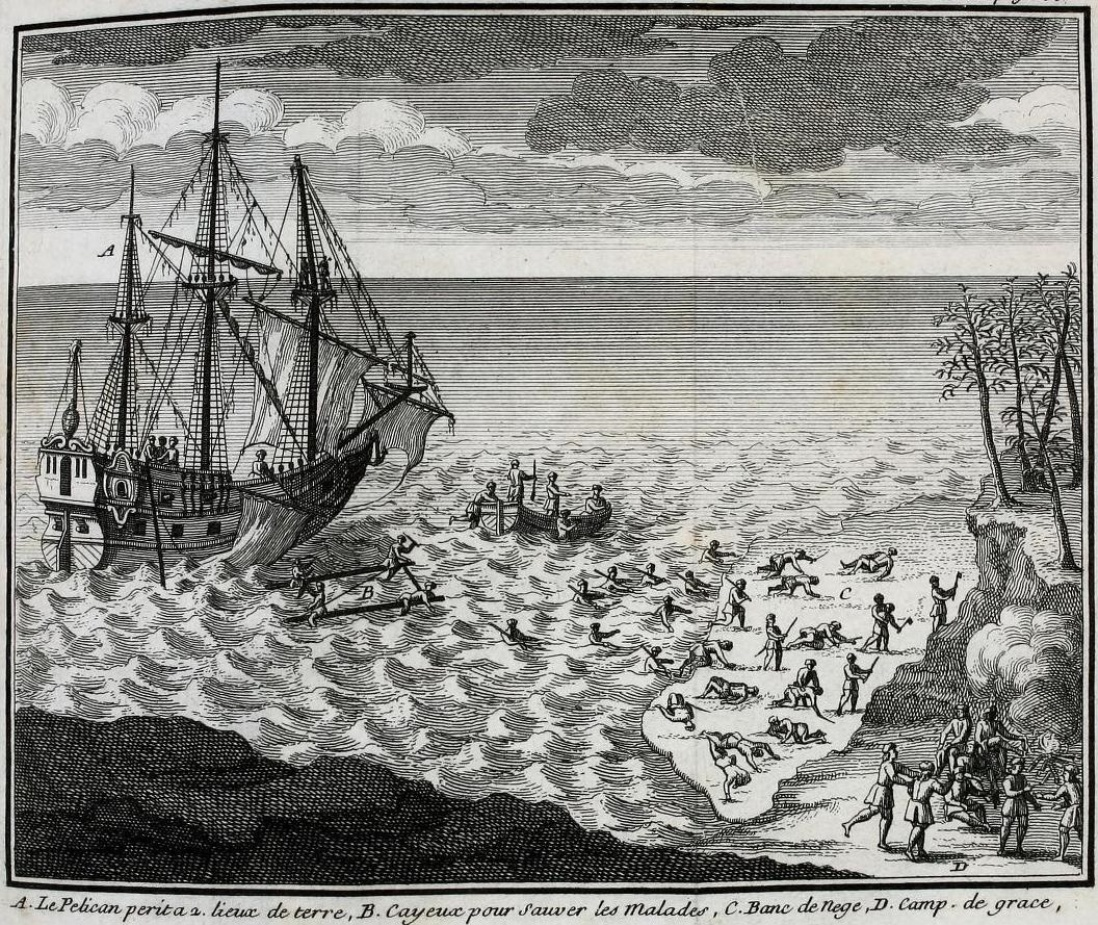
Sinking of the Pélican after the Battle of Hudson's Bay. Although victorious in battle, Pélican sustained damage and subsequently sank.

The war also served as a backdrop for an ongoing economic war between French and English interests in Arctic North America. The Hudson's Bay Company had established trading outposts on James Bay and the southern reaches of Hudson Bay by the early 1680s. In a series of raids, beginning with the Hudson Bay expedition, organized by Denonville and continuing until the Nine Years' War, most of those outposts, including Moose Factory, York Factory, and Fort Albany, were taken by French raiders, primarily led by d'Iberville.

However, the French forces were small, and their hold on the captured posts quite weak—York Factory was recaptured by the English in 1695. In 1697, in the Battle of Hudson's Bay, one of the war's major naval battles, d'Iberville, with a single ship, defeated three English ships and went on to again capture York Factory.

== Aftermath ==
The Treaty of Ryswick, signed in September 1697 ended the war between the two colonial powers and reverted the colonial borders to the status quo ante bellum. The peace did not last long; and within five years, the colonies were embroiled in the next phase of the colonial wars, Queen Anne's War. After their settlement with France in 1701, the Haudenosaunee remained neutral in that conflict and never took part in active hostilities against either side. Tensions remained high between the English and the tribes of the Wabanaki Confederacy, which again fought with the French in Queen Anne's War, and conflict was characterized by frequent raids in Massachusetts, including one on Groton in 1694, in which children were kidnapped, and the Raid on Deerfield in 1704, in which more than 100 captives were taken north to Montreal for ransom or adoption by the Mohawks and the French. By the end of the war, the Natives had succeeded in killing more than 700 English and capturing over 250 along the border of Acadia and New England.

The Treaty of Ryswick was unsatisfactory to representatives of the Hudson's Bay Company. Since most of its trading posts in Hudson Bay had been lost to the French before the war began, the rule of status quo ante bellum meant that they remained under French control. The company recovered its territories at the negotiating table when the Treaty of Utrecht ended Queen Anne's War.

Scholars debate whether the war was a contributing factor to the Salem witch trials. King William's War and King Philip's War (1675–78) led to the displacement of many refugees in Essex County. The refugees carried with them fears of the Indians, which is debated to have led to fears of witchcraft, especially since the devil was arguably closely associated with Indians and magic. Of course, Cotton Mather also wrote that it would lead to an age of sorrow and was arguably a proponent in leading Salem into the witchcraft crisis of 1692. Scholars debate that theory, and one scholar, Jenny Hale Pulsipher, maintains that King William's War was more of a cause. Other scholars that have written on the theory of the wars being a leading cause of the Salem Witchcraft Trials include Mary Beth Norton, James Kences, and Emerson Baker.

== See also ==
- Colonial American military history
- Military history of Canada
  - Military history of Nova Scotia
- Military history of England
- Military history of France
