= John Nelson (merchant) =

English merchant, born 1654

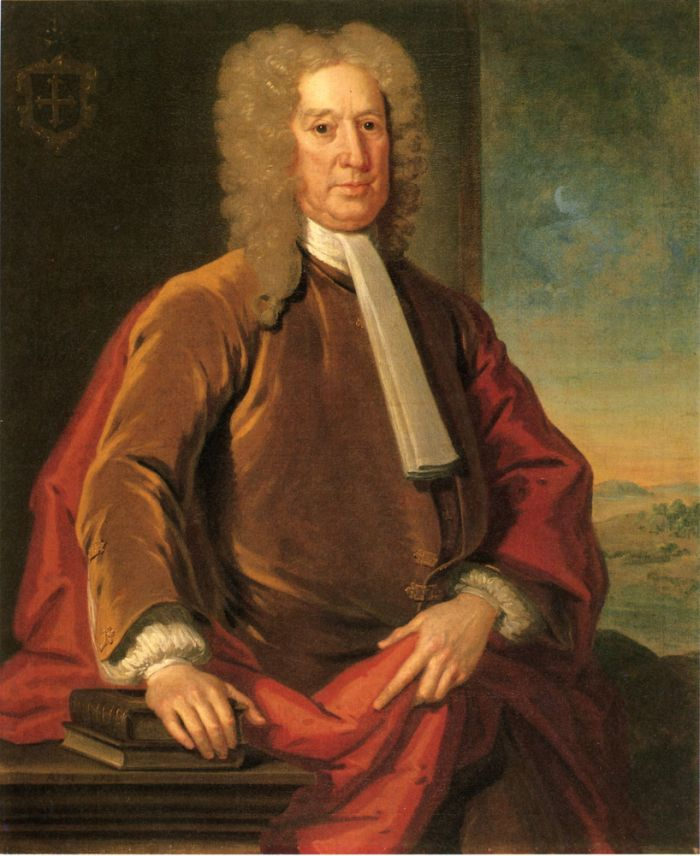
- Portrait by John Smibert
- Born: 1654; London, England
- Died: 1734; Boston, Province of Massachusetts Bay
- Known for: Prominent merchant and political activist in the American colonial era
- Spouse: Elizabeth Tailer
- Children: Rebecca Elizabeth; Mehetable; Margaret; Temple Pachal
- Parent(s): Robert and Mary Nelson

John Nelson (1654–1734) was an English colonial merchant, trader, and statesman, active in New England.

== Biography ==
=== Early life ===
John Nelson was born near London, England, in 1654 to Robert and Mary Nelson. He came to Boston in 1680 and married Elizabeth Tailer, who was 12 years his junior. That same year he became a member of the Ancient and Honorable Artillery Company of Massachusetts. He would later become a captain in the colonial militia.

He was a nephew of Sir Thomas Temple, a British proprietor and governor of Nova Scotia, and inherited much of Temple's estate, including his territorial claims to Nova Scotia (which had been restored to France as Acadia in the Treaty of Breda).

=== Boston revolt ===
On 19 April 1689, Nelson, a resident of Long Island in Boston Harbor, was one of a number of prominent Bostonians leading a revolt against Governor Sir Edmund Andros. Andros, the hated governor of the Dominion of New England, had angered may colonists by vacating land titles, enforcing the Navigation Acts, and promoting the Church of England.

=== Land deals ===
During 1690, John Nelson bought all of the property from the tenants on Long Island with the exception of four and one-half acres owned by Thomas Stanberg, a shopkeeper from Boston. Stanberg was one of the original tenants on Long Island. Nelson was well connected politically, being a close relative of Sir Thomas Temple and the husband of Elizabeth Tailer, the niece of Lieutenant Governor William Stoughton and sister to Lieutenant Governor William Tailer. On 4 June, Nelson mortgaged his Long Island property to William and Benjamin Browne from Salem, Massachusetts, for 1,200 pounds. Henry Mare managed the Brownes' house and land on Long Island.

=== Capture by the French ===
In 1691, in the Naval battle off St. John, John Nelson was captured by the French while on a trading or privateering voyage to Acadia, and was imprisoned in Quebec. It was common for local privateers to receive commissions in Boston but were considered pirates by the other nations of the world, especially the French and Spanish, who were the superpowers at the time.

While in prison, Nelson learned about secret French plans for attacks against the Massachusetts colonies. Nelson discreetly informed the Massachusetts authorities of this information from his prison cell. For this act, Nelson was punished by being transported across the Atlantic Ocean to the Bastille prison in France. In 1702, after ten years of imprisonment, his relative, Sir Purbeck Temple, obtained his release. Nelson immediately returned home to Nelson's Island (Long Island) as a local hero. In 1696 he communicated a "a scheme for the reduction of Canada" to the British authorities.

=== Political activities ===
Nelson was a signer of "The Humble Address of the Publicans of New-England" in 1691.

He was not allowed any share in the subsequent government, likely on account of his being an Anglican, according to Thomas Hutchinson.

=== Family and later life ===
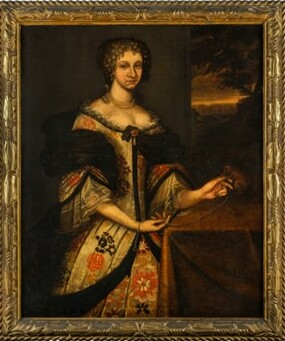
Elizabeth Tailer Nelson (1667–1734) by an unknown artist

Nelson married his wife, Elizabeth, and had six children. Rebecca, who married Henry Lloyd, Elizabeth, who married Nathaniel Hubbard, Mehetable, who married Captain Robert Temple, Margaret who married Captain Thomas Steele, Temple, and Pachal.

Nelson and his wife were active in the activities of King's Chapel from 1700 to 1719.
