= Kancamagus =

Kancamagus (pronounced "kan-kah-mah-gus", "Fearless One", "Fearless Hunter of Animals"), was the third and final Sagamore of the Penacook Confederacy of Native American tribes. Nephew of Wonalancet and grandson of Passaconaway, Kancamagus ruled what is now southern New Hampshire. Wearied of fighting English settlers, as in the Raid on Dover, he made the decision in 1691 to move north into upper New Hampshire and what is now Quebec, Canada.

Kancamagus was also known as John Hogkins or John Hawkins.

The Kancamagus Highway, which runs through the White Mountain National Forest, is named after Kancamagus.
