= Louis-Alexandre des Friches de Menneval =

Governor of Acadia

Louis-Alexandre des Friches de Menneval (French pronunciation: [lwi alɛksɑ̃dʁ de fʁiʃ də mɛnval]; fl. 1687–1703) was a governor of Acadia from 1687–1690.

Little is known of his early life. He did serve in the French army in France with distinction and won Turenne’s notice and praise.

Friches de Menneval was appointed governor of Acadia on 1 March 1687. He replaced François-Marie Perrot on the recommendation of Marquis de Chevry. At that time, he was still only a company lieutenant in the army. He was to encourage settlement and agriculture while preventing the English from trading and fishing in the Acadian jurisdiction. He was also involved in examining and investigating the activities of the former governor.

Friches de Menneval did not arrive at Port-Royal until late fall and was to refurbish the fort which provided little protection against the British. He recommended that a new Fort Pentagouet be built on the Penobscot River. A variety of setbacks occurred in the next two years and no real progress was made on fortifications. In 1689, England declared war on France and the poorly fortified Acadian settlements were immediately vulnerable.

Due in large part to aggressive attacks on the British by Frontenac, Governor General of New France during the winter of 1689–90, the British colonies responded with a force under William Phips and Menneval gave up Port Royal without a fight.

Louis-Alexandre des Friches de Menneval did not have much success as governor. Success would have required exceptional courage and talents, and Menneval was ill-prepared and -supported during his tenure in very difficult times. He was replaced by Joseph Robineau de Villebon, a governor to whom he lent support.
