= Siege of Pemaquid (1689) =

Action of King William's War

Coordinates: 43.8775°N 69.5247°W

- Part of King William's War
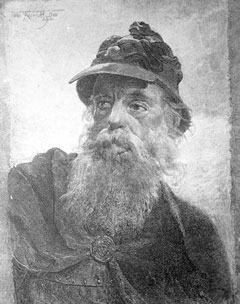
- Baron Jean-Vincent d'Abbadie de Saint-Castin
Date	August 2–3, 1689
Location	Pemaquid (present-day Bristol, Maine)
Result	French and Indian victory

Belligerents
Acadia; Abenaki	New England

Commanders and leaders
St. Castin and Father Louis-Pierre Thury; Chief Moxus	James Weems

Strength
100 to 300	18 to 30

Casualties and losses
Unknown	Possibly a total of 80 from both sides.

The siege of Pemaquid (August 2–3, 1689) was a successful attack by a large band of Abenaki Indians on the English fort at Pemaquid, Fort Charles, then the easternmost outpost of colonial Massachusetts (present-day Bristol, Maine). The French-Abenaki attack was led by Jean-Vincent d'Abbadie de Saint-Castin and Father Louis-Pierre Thury and Chief Moxus. The fall of Pemaquid was a significant setback to the English. It pushed the frontier back to Casco (Falmouth), Maine.

== Siege ==
The fort at Pemaquid was under the command of Lieutenant James Weems and was significantly under strength after most of its garrison had deserted in the wake of the revolt and overthrow of Governor Edmund Andros at Boston, Massachusetts earlier in the year. The complement of soldiers was reduced to thirty and many of these were in a mutinous state. The Indian force surrounded the fort, capturing or killing most of the settlers in the countryside about the fort. Lieutenant Weems provided a defense for a day, but after taking heavy casualties (Weems and 23 of the garrison having been wounded), he surrendered. The Abenaki allowed Weems and his men to return to Boston. On August 4, the Abenaki burned the fort and the nearby settlement of Jamestown.

== Aftermath ==
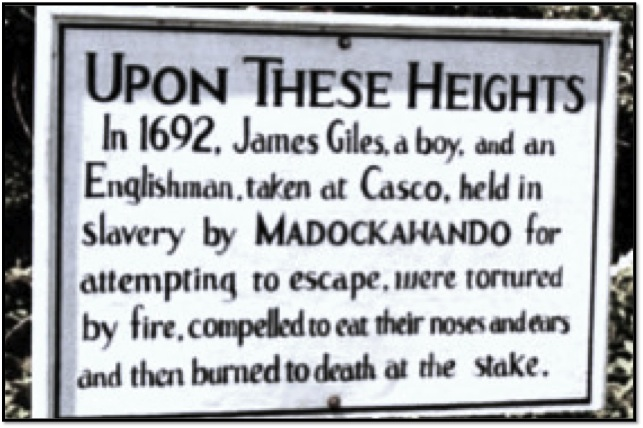
Sign at site of death of John Gyles' brother, Dyce Head Lighthouse Rd., Castine, Maine

Massachusetts responded to the raid by sending out 600 men to the border region. Led by Major Jeremiah Swaine of Reading, Massachusetts, the soldiers' met on August 28, 1689, and then scoured the region. The natives killed 10 of Swaine's men at Falmouth. Despite Swaine's presence, the natives attacked Oyster River (Durham, New Hampshire) and killed 21 and taking several captive. Swaine was then replaced by Major Benjamin Church.

One of the captives the Maliseet took back to their main village Meductic, on the Saint John River was John Gyles, who created one of the few captivity narratives to come out of Nova Scotia/Acadia. John's other brother Thomas escaped the siege. John Gyles' third brother James was also captured at the same time by the Penobscot and eventually taken back to Fort Pentagouet (present-day Castine, Maine) where he was tortured and burned alive at the stake.

The Fort at Pemaquid was rebuilt in stone in 1692–93 and renamed Fort William Henry. Four years later d'Abbadie de Saint-Castin and the Wabanaki Confederacy captured it again.

== See also ==
- Military history of the Maliseet people
