= Raid on Oyster River =

Action of King William's War

Coordinates: 43.133°N 70.924°W

- Part of King William's War
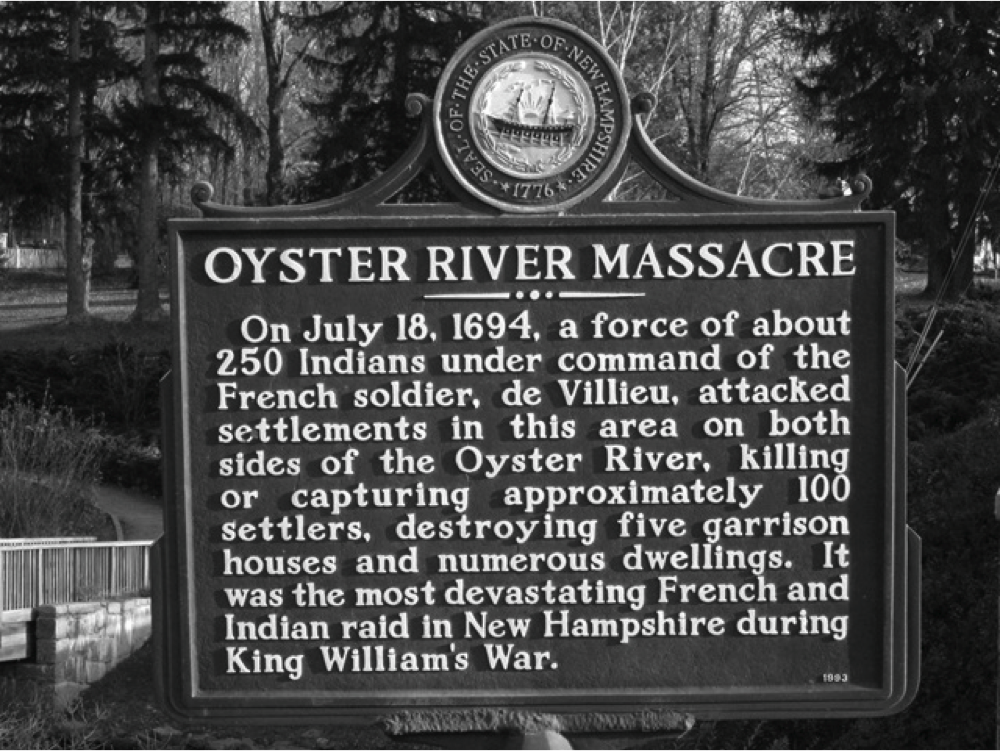
- Original historical marker about the raid
Date	July 18, 1694
Location	Oyster River, Province of New Hampshire (present-day Durham, New Hampshire)
Result	French and Wabanaki Confederacy victory

Belligerents
Province of New Hampshire	New France; Wabanaki Confederacy (Abenaki, Maliseet)

Commanders and leaders
Francis Drew; Thomas Pickford; John Woodman	Claude-Sébastien de Villieu; Louis-Pierre Thury; Bomazeen; Captain Nathaniel; Assacumbuit

Strength
Unknown	c. 250 Abenaki unknown Maliseet

Casualties and losses
104 inhabitants were killed and 27 taken captive	Unknown

The Raid on Oyster River, also known as the Oyster River Massacre, happened during King William's War, on July 18, 1694, when a group of Abenaki and some Maliseet, directed by the French, attacked an English settlement at present-day Durham, New Hampshire. It was the second attack on the village in five years.

This was the most devastating of the many attacks on the Seacoast Region during the war with 104 settlers killed. It remains the third worst disaster to occur in New Hampshire. Other notable attacks were the Cochecho Massacre at Dover Point (1689), the Salmon Falls Raid at South Berwick (1690), and attacks at Sandy Beach (1691), York (1692), Oyster River Massacre (1694) and Portsmouth Plains (1696).

== Historical context ==
Since the Nine Years' War was primarily a European conflict, the Great Powers did not send many resources to the New World, leaving their colonies to fight for themselves. New France was severely outnumbered in terms of colonists and therefore relied heavily on its Native allies.

Massachusetts responded to the French victory at the Siege of Pemaquid of August 2–3, 1689, in present-day Bristol, Maine, by sending out 600 men to the border region. Led by Major Jeremiah Swaine of Reading, Massachusetts, the soldiers met on August 28, 1689, and then scoured the region. Despite Swaine's presence, Indigenous people of the region attacked Oyster River (present-day Durham, New Hampshire) and killed 18 men plus "three or four children" while also taking several people captive. This was the first raid on Oyster River, also known as the Raid on Huckins' Garrison.

Four years later in 1693, after a series of battles, the English at Boston had entered into peace and trade negotiations with the Abenaki tribes in eastern Massachusetts. The French at Quebec under Governor Frontenac wished to disrupt the negotiations and sent Claude-Sébastien de Villieu in the fall of 1693 into present-day Maine, with orders to "place himself at the head of the Acadian Indians and lead them against the English."

Villieu spent the winter at Fort Nashwaak in present-day Fredericton, New Brunswick. The Indigenous people of the region were in general disagreement whether to attack the English or not, but after discussions by Villieu and the support of Father Louis-Pierre Thury and Father Vincent Bigot (at Pentagouet), they went on the offensive.

== Raid ==
The English settlement of Oyster River was attacked on July 18, 1694, by Villieu with about 250 Abenaki, composed of two main groups from the Penobscot and Norridgewock under command of their sagamore Bomazeen (or Bomoseen). A number of Maliseet from Medoctec also took part in the attack. The Abenaki force was divided into two groups to attack the settlement, which was laid out on both sides of the Oyster River waterway. Villieu led the Pentagoet and the Meductic/Nashwaaks.

The attack commenced at daybreak, with the small forts quickly falling to the attackers. In all, 104 inhabitants were killed and 27 taken captive, with half the dwellings, including the garrisons, pillaged and burned to the ground. Crops were destroyed and livestock killed, causing famine and destitution for survivors.

After the successful raid on Oyster River, Villieu joined Acadian Governor Joseph Robineau de Villebon as the commander of Fort Nashwaak, capital of Acadia.

== Legacy ==
A New Hampshire historical marker (number 50) about the raid, originally titled "Oyster River Massacre", was erected by the State of New Hampshire in the late 1960s. It was removed in 2021, after the state's Commission on Native American Affairs deemed the marker's language "problematic" in a filing with the New Hampshire Division of Historical Resources. A replacement marker was not in place for several years, reportedly due to disagreement between representatives of local and state agencies about revised wording. A new marker, titled "Oyster River... is Layd Waste", was reported to be in place, in a different location in Durham, in early January 2026.

== See also ==
- List of disasters in New Hampshire by death toll
- Raid on Dover
- Military history of the Maliseet people
- Hill-Woodman-Ffrost House, claimed to date to 1649, thus possibly extant at the time of the Raid on Oyster River

== Sources ==
Primary texts

- William L. Wolkovich - Valkavicius, "The Groton Indian Raid of 1694 and Lydia Longley", Historical Journal of Massachusetts Volume 30, No. 2 (Summer 2002)
- Acadia at the end of the 17th Century, p. 56
- A French account of the raid upon the New England frontier in 1694. Acadiensis. 1901
- Rev. John Pike, Journal of the Rev. John Pike, of Dover, N.H., ed. Rev. A.H. Quint (Cambridge: Press of John Wilson and Son, 1876)
- Jan K. Herman, "Massacre at Oyster River," New Hampshire Profiles, October 1976, 50.
- Francis Parkman, Count Frontenac and New France under Louis XIV, vol. 2 of France and England in North America (1877; reprint, New York: The Library of America, 1983)
- Jeremy Belknap, The History of New Hampshire, ed. John Farmer (Dover, N.H.: S.C. Stevens and Ela & Wadleigh, 1831)
- Thomas Hutchinson, The History of the Colony and Province of Massachusetts Bay (originally published 1764–1828; reprint, Cambridge: Harvard University Press, 1936), 2:55.
- Cotton Mather, Decennium Luctuosum (Boston, 1699); reprinted in Magnalia Christi Americana (London, 1702), 86.
- Everett S. Stackpole, History of New Hampshire (New York: The American Historical Society, 1926), 1:182.
- Samuel Adams Drake, The Border Wars of New England Commonly called King William's and Queen Anne's Wars (Williamstown, Mass: Corner House, 1973), 96.
- Jan K. Herman, "Massacre on the Northern New England Frontier, 1689–1694" (master's thesis, University of New Hampshire, 1966), 43.
- Kenneth M. Morrison, The Embattled Northeast (Berkeley: University of California Press, 1984), 128.
- John Clarence Webster, Acadia at the End of the Seventeenth Century. Saint John, NB, The New Brunswick Museum, 1979.
- The address of C. Alice Baker - History and Proceedings of the Pocumtuck Valley Memorial Association, Volume 4, p. 401
- Samuel Abbott Green, "Groton during the Indian Wars"; see: "King Williams War"
