= Fort Nashwaak =

17th-century fort in New Brunswick, Canada

Coordinates: 45°57′42″N 66°37′33″W

- Fredericton, New Brunswick,
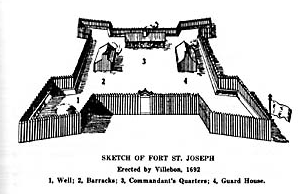
- Fort Nashwaak plan

Site information
- Controlled by: French

Site history
- Built: 1691-1692
- Battles/wars: Siege of Fort Nashwaak (1696)

National Historic Site of Canada
- Designated: 1924

Fort Nashwaak (also known as Fort Naxoat, Fort St. Joseph) was the capital of Acadia and is now a National Historic Site of Canada in present-day Fredericton, New Brunswick, Canada. It was located strategically up the Saint John River and close to the native village of Fort Meductic for military purposes.

The fort was built during King William's War following the defeat of the capital of Acadia at Port Royal. In 1691-1692, Governor of Acadia Joseph de Villebon built Fort Nashwaak at Nashwaaksis on the north side of the Saint John River at the mouth of the Nashwaak River. It replaced Fort Jemseg (which had replaced Port Royal) as the capital of Acadia.

After Claude-Sébastien de Villieu's successful Raid on Oyster River on the New England frontier, he joined Governor de Villebon as the commander of Fort Nashwaak. From Fort Nashwaak, they executed numerous raids on the New England border with Acadia, aided by their Abenaki and other First Nations allies. The Governor and his forces were involved in the Raid on Oyster River. His most significant success was the Siege of Pemaquid (1696). He benefited greatly from the support of Frontenac in his endeavours. In retaliation, in 1696 the British made an attempted siege of the capital. After de Villebon's death in 1700 and a devastating flood, the fort was abandoned.

The site of the former fort was designated a National Historic Site in 1924.

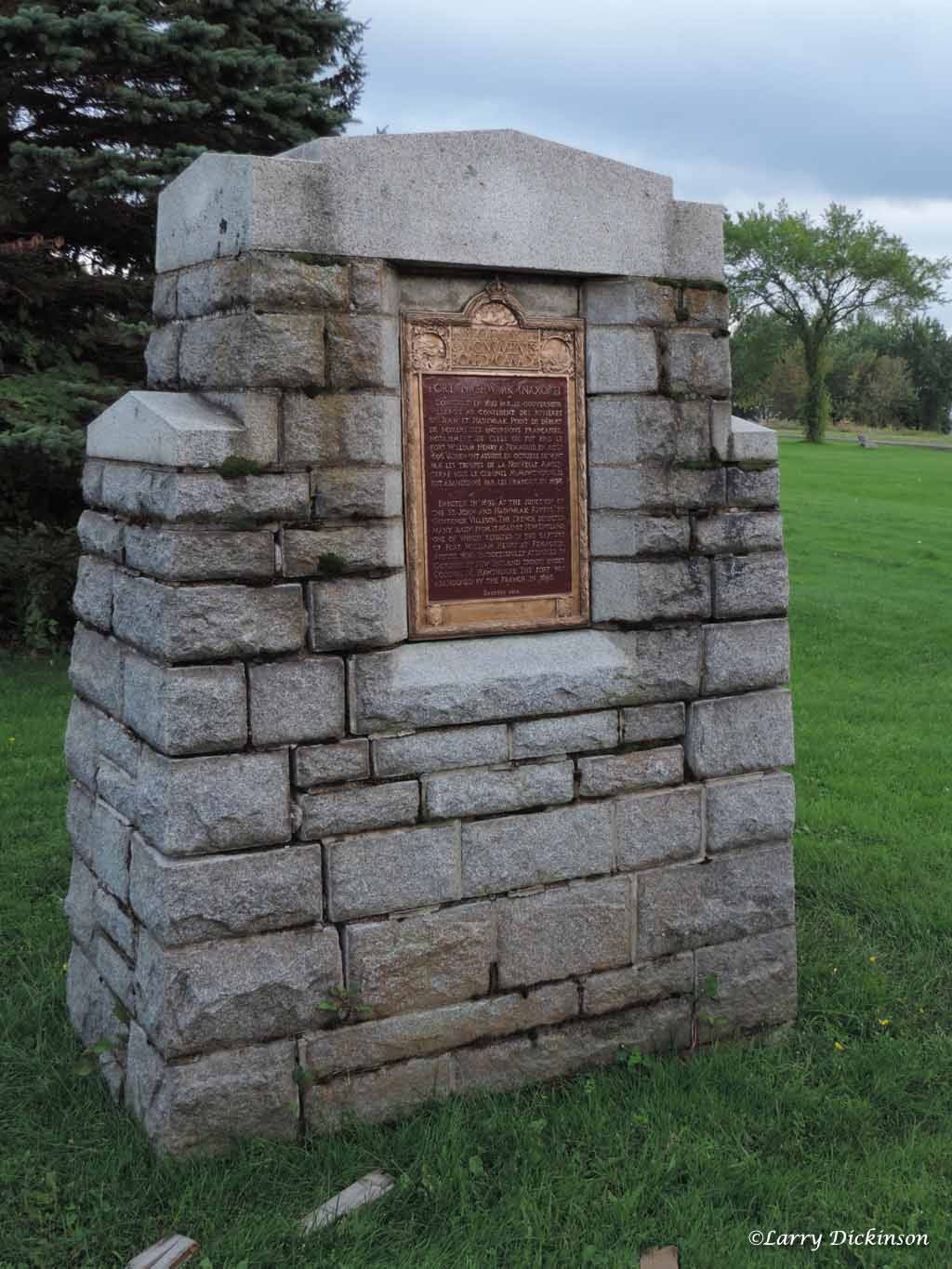
Fort Nashwaak Monument - National Historic Site

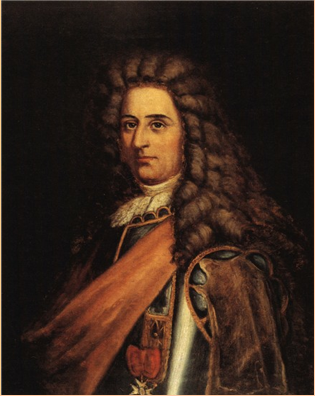
Jacques Testard de Montigny - led attacks on New England from Fort Nashwaak

== See also ==
- Military history of Nova Scotia
