= Jean Baudoin =

French Sulpician priest and missionary

Jean Baudoin (French pronunciation: [ʒɑ̃ bodwɛ̃]; 1662–1698) was a French Sulpician priest who served as a missionary in Acadia, and later as a chaplain during military expeditions carried on by Pierre Le Moyne d'Iberville.

== Life ==
Jean Baudoin studied at the College of Nantes with the intention of becoming a Musketeers of the Guard, but then decided on an ecclesiastical career, after studying with the Sulpicians was ordained a priest in 1685. As he wished to be a missionary, he went to Acadia.

He arrived in Port-Royal in 1688 and soon made his way to Beaubassin, Baudoin had a number of clashes with Governor Joseph Robineau de Villebon. The parishioners complained that he neglected the parish to spend time with the Miꞌkmaq. They also complained of the lack of a regular schedule for Sunday Mass since many had to walk a considerable distance. These and other objections resulted in his being recalled to Quebec and later to France.

During King William's War, Baudoin returned to Acadia with Pierre Le Moyne d'Iberville, who was to carry out an expedition against the English in the Siege of Pemaquid and the Avalon Peninsula Campaign. Abbé Baudoin acted both as chaplain and as an expert on the area. Some historians have referred to the New England/ Acadia/ Newfoundland theatre of the war as Father Baudoin's War.

He died at Beaubassin, Acadia in 1698.

== Sources ==
- Williams, Alan F. (1987). Father Baudoin's War: D'Iberville's Campaigns in Acadia and Newfoundland, 1696, 1697. Memorial University of Newfoundland. ISBN 978-0-88901-144-1.
