= Joseph Robineau de Villebon =

Governor of Acadia

Joseph Robineau (or Robinau) de Villebon (French pronunciation: [ʒozɛf ʁɔbino də vilbɔ̃]; 22 August 1655 – 5 July 1700), a governor of Acadia, was born in New France and received much of his education and military experience in France.

Robinau de Villebon's importance in history occurred after his return to New France about 1681 and his deployment to Acadia in about 1685 to assist governor François-Marie Perrot and, subsequently, governor Louis-Alexandre des Friches de Meneval. It is known he was in France when William Phips captured Port Royal, Acadia in the spring of 1690. Phips took prisoners including de Meneval to Boston.

Joseph Robineau re-established French rule in Acadia and was made governor there, a position he held until his death. He built the capital at Fort Nashwaak and was able to maintain the New England-Acadia boundary in present-day Maine because of his military talents and his skill in dealing with the Wabanaki Confederacy. He was involved in the Raid on Oyster River. His most significant success was the Siege of Pemaquid (1696). He benefited greatly from the support of Frontenac in his endeavours.
