= List of Acadians =

This is a list of notable Acadians, and people of Acadia origins.

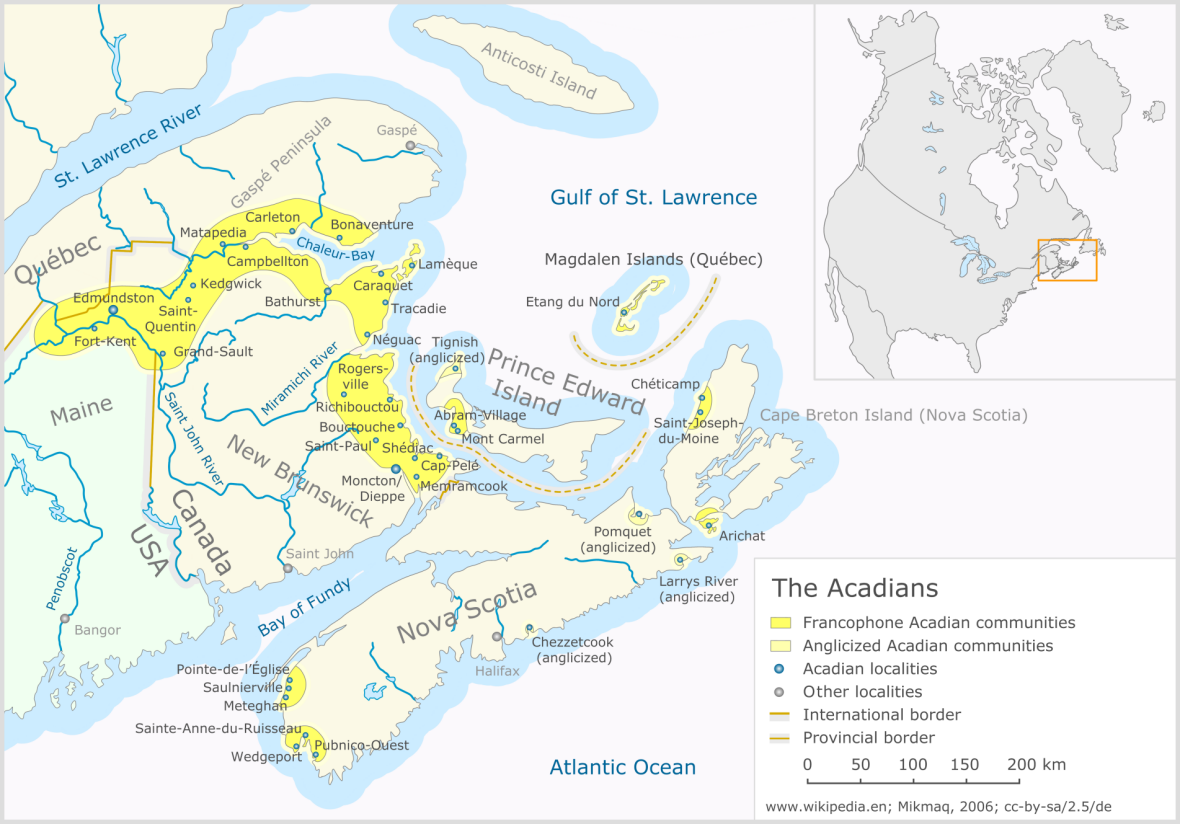
Present-day Acadian communities (in yellow).

To be included in this list, the person must have a Wikipedia article showing they are Acadian or must have references showing they are Acadian and are notable.

== Actors ==
- Ryan Doucette – actor from Clare, Nova Scotia
- Matt LeBlanc – actor, known for TV show Friends. Both of his father's parents are of Acadian ancestry. Descendant of Daniel LeBlanc.
- Robert Maillet – actor, professional wrestler from Sainte-Marie-de-Kent, New Brunswick
- Patricia McKenzie – actress born in Les Îles-de-la-Madeleine (Painchaud family)
- Philip Bourneuf – actor born in Somerville, Massachusetts. His parents, Ambrose Bourneuf and Josephine Comeau, are of Acadian ancestry. His mother was born in Clare, Nova Scotia as were his paternal grandparents.

== Law and politics ==
- Aubin-Edmond Arsenault – former Premier of Prince Edward Island (1917–1919)
- Joseph-Octave Arsenault – first Acadian Prince Edward Island member of the Canadian Senate
- Télesphore Arsenault – Canadian politician, business manager and farmer
- Marcel Arsenault – philanthropist billionaire, donated all his wealth to charity
- Guy Arseneault – Provincial MLA and former Member of the House of Commons of Canada (1988–1997)
- Michel Bastarache – Supreme Court of Canada (1997–2008)
- Léopold Belliveau – first Acadian mayor of Moncton, New Brunswick
- Edmond Blanchard – chief justice of the Court Martial Appeal Court of Canada, former politician
- Victor Boudreau – New Brunswick politician and Canadian senator
- Gérald Clavette – New Brunswick politician
- Ambroise-Hilaire Comeau – first Acadian from Nova Scotia to be a member of the Canadian Senate
- Gerald Comeau – former member of the Canadian Senate
- Chris d'Entremont – Nova Scotia MLA and MP
- Ray Frenette – former Premier of New Brunswick (1997–1998)
- Brian Gallant – former Premier of New Brunswick (2014–2018)
- Arthur J. LeBlanc – former Justice of the Supreme Court of Nova Scotia (1998–2017) and Lieutenant-Governor of Nova Scotia (2017–2024)
- Dominic LeBlanc — Canadian MP and cabinet minister (son of Roméo LeBlanc)
- Neil LeBlanc – Consul General to Boston, Massachusetts, and former Nova Scotia MLA, Minister of Finance
- Roméo LeBlanc – politician and journalist, former Governor-General of Canada (1995–1999)
- Viola Léger – former senator and actress
- Rodney Ouellette – Canadian senator and physician/scientist
- Pascal Poirier – first Acadian member of the Canadian Senate (1885–1933)
- Louis Robichaud – former Premier of New Brunswick (1960–1970)
- Camille Thériault – former Premier of New Brunswick (1998–1999)
- Robert Thibault – Canadian Liberal MP
- Peter J. Veniot – former Premier of New Brunswick (1923–1925)

== Military veterans ==
- Pierre Maisonnat dit Baptiste
- Alexandre Bourg
- Joseph Broussard (Beausoleil)
- Charles de Saint-Étienne de la Tour
- Bernard-Anselme d'Abbadie de Saint-Castin
- Jean-Vincent d'Abbadie de Saint-Castin
- Joseph d'Abbadie de Saint-Castin
- François Dupont Duvivier
- Joseph-Nicolas Gautier and his wife
- Joseph Godin dit Bellefontaine, Sieur de Beauséjour – Commander of the Acadian Militia of the St-John River valley (St. John River Campaign)
- William Johnson (Guillaume Jeanson) – Battle of Bloody Creek (1757)
- Bernard Marres 'Marc' dit La Sonde – fought the British at Canso, Nova Scotia (1718)
- Abel LeBlanc – Petit de Grat, NS, West Nova Scotia Regiment, wounded while in combat in Italy.
- Joseph LeBlanc, dit Le Maigre
- Pierre II Surette
- Joseph Winniett – supported the British; grandchild of Pierre Maisonnat dit Baptiste

== Musicians ==
- Angèle Arsenault – singer-songwriter, media host
- Marcel Aymar – singer
- P'tit Belliveau – singer-songwriter, guitarist, composer
- Édith Butler – singer-songwriter
- Zachary Richard – singer-songwriter
- Yvette d'Entremont - singer-songwriter
- Julie Doiron – singer-songwriter
- Patsy Gallant – singer and actress
- Boozoo Chavis – singer-songwriter
- Wilfred Le Bouthillier – singer
- Lisa LeBlanc – singer-songwriter
- Sylvia LeLièvre - singer-songwriter
- Anna Malenfant – contralto and composer
- Natasha St-Pier – singer
- Radio Radio – hip hop group; Jacques Doucet, Alexandre Bilodeau, Gabriel Malenfant
- Fayo – singer-songwriter
- Yvette Tollar – jazz singer, composer
- Roch Voisine – singer-songwriter
- Clarence White – guitarist

== Sports ==
- Louis Cyr – weightlifter, "Strongest Man in the World"
- Eric Cyr – MLB player
- Paul Cyr – NHL player
- Jean Béliveau – Hockey Hall of Fame, Montreal Canadiens
- Luc Bourdon – NHL player
- Leo Burke (Leonce Cormier) – wrestler
- Jean-Louis Cormier (Rudy Kay) – wrestler
- Rhéal Cormier – Major League Baseball pitcher
- Yvon Cormier (The Beast) – wrestler
- René Duprée – wrestler
- Yvon Durelle – boxer
- Suzanne Gaudet – curler
- Ron Guidry – Major League Baseball pitcher
- Lance Cormier – Major League Baseball pitcher
- Bobby Hebert – NFL Quarterback New Orleans Saints
- Camille Henry – NHL player, winner of the Lady Byng Trophy and the Calder Memorial Trophy
- Bobby Kay (Romeo Cormier) – wrestler
- Jacques LeBlanc – boxer
- Robert Maillet – wrestler
- Roland Melanson – NHL goalie
- Chad Ogea – Major League Baseball pitcher
- Dustin Poirier – Mixed martial arts fighter
- Henri Richard – Hockey Hall of Fame, Montreal Canadiens
- Maurice Richard – Hockey Hall of Fame, Montreal Canadiens
- Ryan Theriot – Major League Baseball infielder

== Visual artists ==
- Elizabeth Lefort – tapestry artist, Order of Canada
- Anne-Marie Sirois – visual artist, writer and film director

== Writers ==
- Gilbert Buote – educator, publisher and author
- Anselme Chiasson – Catholic priest, educator, writer
- Herménégilde Chiasson – writer, ex-lieutenant-governor of New Brunswick
- Joey Comeau – writer, comic creator
- France Daigle – writer and playwright
- Andrea Doucet – sociologist and writer
- Clive Doucet – writer
- Placide Gaudet – historian, educator, genealogist and journalist. His research and papers play an important role in the preservation of the Acadian history.
- Valentin Landry – journalist and educator
- Émilie Leblanc – Acadian activist and educator
- Gérald Leblanc – poet
- Louis Haché – writer, translator, historian
- Antonine Maillet – writer and playwright; Prix Goncourt 1979
- Alden Nowlan – poet, novelist, and playwright
- Marie-Colombe Robichaud – writer and playwright

== Media ==
- Phil Comeau – film and television director; Orders of Canada, New Brunswick and Nova Scotia.
- Lyse Doucet – news correspondent and presenter, BBC World
- Sami Landri – Drag artist and social media personality

== Pre-deportation ==
- David Basset – trader and privateer
- Joseph Broussard (Beausoleil)
- Noel Doiron – leader of the Acadians; died in the single greatest tragedy of the Expulsion, the sinking of the Duke William
- Jeanne Dugas – wife of Pierre Bois, one of the co-founders of Chéticamp, Nova Scotia
- Joseph-Nicolas Gautier – merchant trader and Acadian militia leader
- Daniel LeBlanc – immigrant and progenitor of the LeBlanc family, the largest Acadian family at the time of the deportation
- Pierre LeBlanc – early settler of Pointe-de-l'Église, Nova Scotia
- Bernard Marot (fl. 1590–1650) – French surgeon and ship's captain.
- Philippe Mius d'Entremont – lieutenant-major under Charles de Saint-Étienne de la Tour, who, in 1653, awarded him the first fief in Acadia, the Barony of Pobomcoup (currently Pubnico, Nova Scotia). He later became the King's Attorney in Acadia.
- Joseph d'Abbadie de Saint-Castin – military officer and Abenaki chief
- Pierre II Surette – Acadian resistance leader and co-founder of Ste. Anne du Ruisseau, Nova Scotia

== See also ==
- List of First Nations peoples
- List of Cajuns
- List of Louisiana Creoles
- List of people by nationality
