= Battle of Bloody Creek =

Battle of Bloody Creek refers to one of two battles that took place at the roughly the same location in present-day Carleton Corner, Nova Scotia:

- Battle of Bloody Creek (1711), fought during Queen Anne's War (War of the Spanish Succession)
- Battle of Bloody Creek (1757), fought during the French and Indian War (Seven Years' War)

It may also refer to the Battle of Bloody Brook (1675), fought in South Deerfield, Massachusetts during King Philip's War.
