= First Abenaki War =

The First Abenaki War (also known as the northern theatre of King Philip's War) was fought along the New England/Acadia border primarily in present-day Maine. Richard Waldron and Charles Frost led the forces in the northern region, while Jean-Vincent d'Abbadie de Saint-Castin worked with the tribes that would make up the Wabanaki Confederacy. The natives engaged in annual campaigns against the English settlements in 1675, 1676, and 1677. Waldron sent forces so far north that he attacked the Mi'kmaq in Acadia.

Historian Georges Cerbelaud Salagnac writes that Castine and the Abenaki "displayed consummate skill at it, holding in check at every point, from the Penobscot River to Salmon Falls, N.H., and even beyond, 700 regular troops, and even inflicting humiliating defeats upon them." The official records indicate natives killed or captured 260 English. The villages of Cape Neddick, Scarborough, Casco, Arrowsick, Pemaquid and several others were destroyed. The war cost the colonial government £8,000.

== Historical context ==
Jean-Vincent d'Abbadie de Saint-Castin was sent from Quebec at the outset of the war with the governor's orders to organize all the natives "throughout the whole colony of Acadia to adopt the interests of the king of France." After Saint-Castin had settled among the Abenakis, King Philip (Pometacom) and his warriors ravaged New England in 1675. Historian Georges Salagnac writes that, "One may reasonably suppose that Saint-Castin began to exercise his talents as a military counsellor on the occasion of this war." The people of Boston thought Saint-Castin was influencing the Wabanaki strategy and supplying them with superior equipment.

== The war ==
In the Northeast Coast Campaign (1675) the Wabanaki Confederacy raided English settlements along the New England/Acadia border in present-day Maine. They killed eighty colonists and burned many farms, blunting the tide of English expansion. Settlers deserted community after community, leaving only the settlements south of the Saco River to maintain an Anglo presence in the region.

In the Northeast Coast Campaign (1676) the Wabanaki Confederacy raided English settlements along the New England/Acadia border in present-day Maine. In the first month, they laid waste to 15 leagues of the coast east of Casco. They killed and captured colonists and burned many farms, blunting the tide of English expansion. The Campaign of 1676 led the English to abandon the region, retreating to Salem. The campaign is most notable for Richard Waldron entering the war, the death of Chief Mogg and the attack on the Mi'kmaq that initiated their involvement in the war.

Natives attacked a settlement at the Sheepscot River near Merrymeeting Bay in Maine in August 1676. Notably, Sir William Phips rescued local settlers by bringing them on board his vessel, forgoing his cargo of lumber. Although he was financially ruined (the Indians destroyed the shipyard and his intended cargo), he was seen as a hero in Boston.

In the Northeast Coast Campaign (1677) the Wabanaki Confederacy raided English settlements along the New England/Acadia border in present-day Maine. They killed and captured colonists and burned many farms, blunting the tide of English expansion.

== Afterwards ==
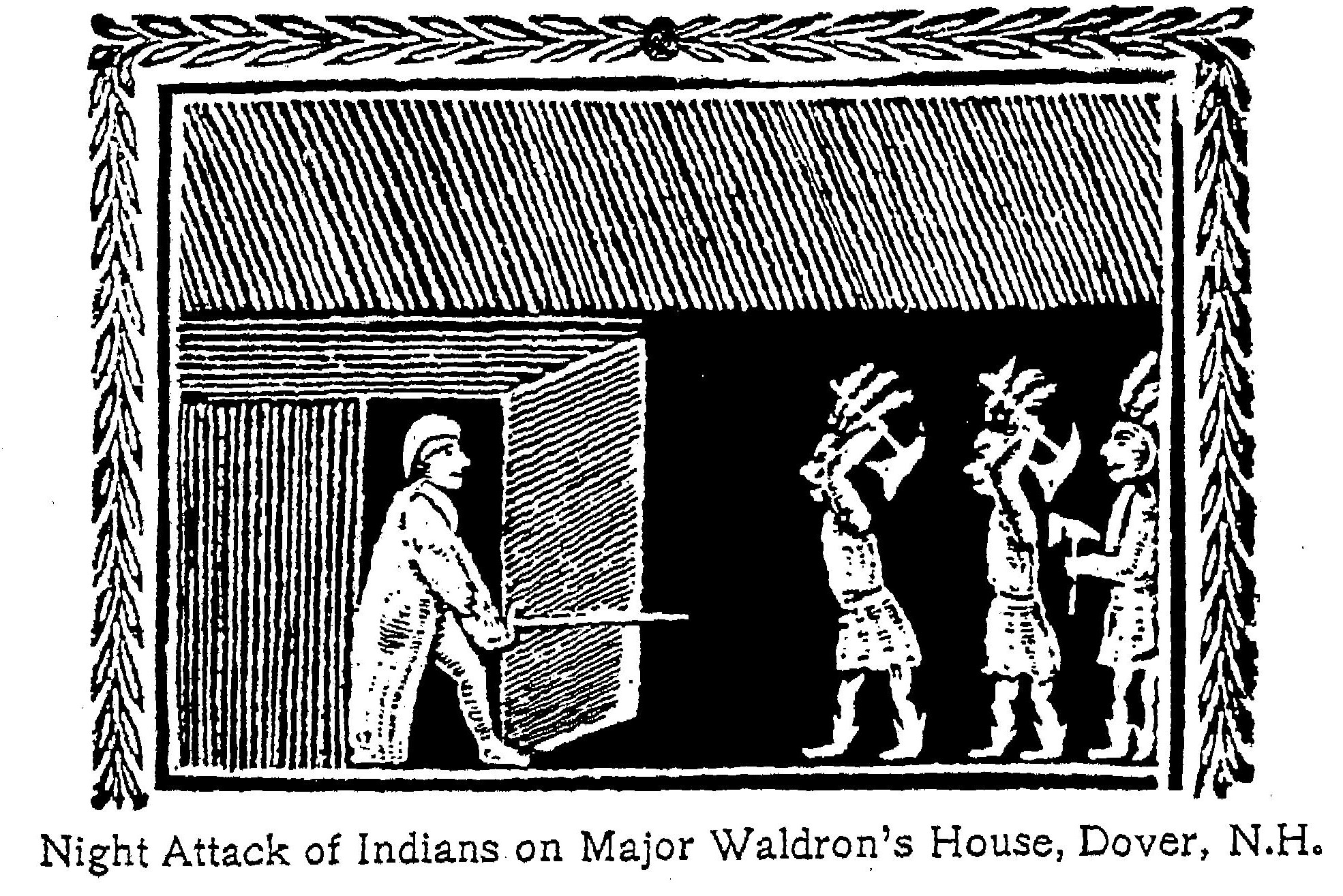
Native revenge on Richard Waldron for his role in King Philip's War, Dover, New Hampshire (1689)

In response to King Philip's War and King William's War (1689–97), many colonists from northeastern Maine and Massachusetts temporarily relocated to larger towns in Massachusetts and New Hampshire to avoid Wabanaki Indian raids.

The fighting ended in the northern theatre with the Treaty of Casco (1678). Natives assassinated both Charles Frost and Charles Waldon in King William's War. Phips would initiate an attack on the capital of Acadia, Port Royal.

Conflict continued for decades in Maine, New Hampshire and northern Massachusetts. In response to King Philip's War, which stemmed from New England expansion onto native land, the five Indian tribes in the region of Acadia created the Wabanaki Confederacy to form a political and military alliance with New France to stop the New England expansion. During the next 74 years, six colonial wars between New France and New England, along with their respective native allies, took place, starting with King William's War in 1689. (See the French and Indian Wars, Father Rale's War and Father Le Loutre's War.) The conflict was over the border between New England and Acadia, which New France defined as the Kennebec River in southern Maine.
