= Battle of Port La Tour (1677) =

1677 battle in Acadia colony, North America

The Battle of Port La Tour occurred on July 18, 1677, at Port La Tour, Acadia, as part of the Northeast Coast Campaign during the First Abenaki War (the Maine-Acadia theater of King Phillips War) in which the Mi'kmaq attacked New England fishermen. The New Englanders eventually overwhelmed them and many Mi'kmaq were enslaved.

== Historical context ==
Prior to King Philip's War, there is no record of New England and the Mi'kmaq being in conflict. During the First Abenaki War, Major Richard Waldron captured natives for the slave trade. The most significant seizure of natives happened in Dover on September 7, 1676. Later, Waldron gave a mandate to the merchant, Henry Lawton (or Laughton), of the Piscataqua area, to seize all the Indians "of the East" who had been raiding the New England villages along the border with Acadia.

On November 9, 1676 (o.s.), they hired a vessel, the Endeavor, commanded by Captain John Horton. They stopped at Machias and nine natives were taken captive. Then they sailed to Cape Sable Island where 17 Mi'kmaq were taken captive, including the local chief and his wife. They were taken to the Azores and sold as slaves to the Portuguese.

A New England vessel in the Azores notified the authorities in Boston of this possible illegal activity and Endeavor was seized and taken to Boston. Mellanson was released when his mother, Prescilla Mellanson, bailed him. After this, he skipped bail, and went into hiding. He changed his surname to Laverdure to avoid detection and lived in Port Royal thereafter. Henry Lawton and William Waldron were kept in jail but were eventually acquitted.

== The battle ==
The Mi'kmaw response came in July 1677, when about 80 natives attacked 26 New England fishermen who were in six fishing vessels at Port La Tour. The natives boarded one of the vessels, stripped the men of their clothing, tied them up and left them on deck until nightfall, when they commanded them to set sail towards the Penobscot River in Maine, close to Castine. A few hours later, while in the harbor, the New England captain was able to overthrow the natives. Although some natives escaped, the New Englanders imprisoned the rest. They took the prisoners to Marblehead, Massachusetts, where they were tortured and stoned to death by a group of women.

== Afterward ==
As an immediate response, some merchants from Salem, to whom most of the vessels belonged, armed a large ketch, transforming it into a warship. It was manned by forty men who sailed for southern Nova Scotia. They scanned the coast, scrutinized every port, but to no avail. The Indians had gone into hiding.

== See also ==
- Treaty of Casco (1678)
- Military history of Nova Scotia
