= Northeast Coast campaign (1677) =

Conflict in First Abenaki War 1677

The Northeast Coast campaign of 1677 was conducted during the First Abenaki War (the northern theatre of King Philips War) and involved the Wabanaki Confederacy raiding colonial American settlements along the New England Colonies/Acadia border in present-day Maine. The Wabanaki killed and captured colonists and burned many farms, blunting the tide of colonial American expansion.

== Historical context ==
Jean-Vincent d'Abbadie de Saint-Castin was ordered by the Governor of Quebec to organize all the natives "throughout the whole colony of Acadia to adopt the interests of the king of France.” Historian Georges Salagnac writes that, “One may reasonably suppose that Saint-Castin began to exercise his talents as a military counsellor on the occasion of this war.” The people of Boston thought Castine was influencing the Wabanaki strategy and supplying them with superior equipment. The campaign of 1676 followed the Northeast Coast campaign (1675).

== The campaign ==
In February 1677, for the second time, Richard Waldron betrayed the Wabanaki by offering a peace conference in which he disarmed and seized the native leaders. This event led to the first migration of Abenaki to St. Francis (Odanak). In April Simon raided York and Wells, killing ten New England colonists.

On May 14, 1677, the settlers having returned, Chief Mugg Hegone and his forces again laid siege to present-day Scarborough. The siege lasted three days, the Wabanaki killed three soldiers and captured a fourth. On the third day, Mugg was killed and the Wabanaki militia then ended the siege. They then went on to raid York and Wells again, killing seven. As they withdrew, they again raided York on June 29, 1677, the Wabanaki militia ambushed a large force of American soldiers and their native allies near Scarborough. The Wabanaki killed 60 men in total. That summer the Wabanaki stole 20 fishing boats off Maine.

On July 18, 1677, at Port La Tour, Nova Scotia, about 80 Mi’kmaq attacked 26 New England fishermen who were in five fishing vessels. The natives boarded the vessels, stripped the men of their clothing, tied them up, leaving them on deck until nightfall, when they commanded them to set sail towards Penobscot River, in Maine (close to Castine). A few hours later, while still in harbour, the captain was able to regain control of the natives. While some natives escaped, the New Englanders imprisoned some of the natives, taking them to Marblehead, Massachusetts where they were tortured and stoned to death by a group of women.

Retaliatory raids by the colonists on native villages were unsuccessful.

== Afterward ==
The war ended the following year with signing of the Treaty of Casco (1678) at Fort Charles, Pemaquid.
