= Treaty of Casco =

Treaty of Casco may refer to:

- Treaty of Casco (1678)
- Treaty of Casco (1703)
