= Jeanson =

Jeanson is a surname. Notable people with the surname include:

- Cécile Jeanson (born 1972), French swimmer
- Francis Jeanson (1922–2009), French philosopher
- Geneviève Jeanson (born 1981), Canadian cyclist
- Guillaume Jeanson (born 1721), Canadian settler
- Henri Jeanson (1900–1970), French writer and journalist

== See also ==
- Jeanson network, French militant communist group
