= Northeast Coast campaign (1676) =

The Northeast Coast campaign of 1676 took place during King Philip's War. It involved the Wabanaki Confederacy raiding colonial American settlements along the New England Colonies/Acadia border in present-day Maine. In the first month, they laid waste to 15 leagues (approximately 45 miles (72 km)) of the coast east of Casco. They killed and captured colonists and burned many farms, blunting the tide of colonial American expansion. The campaign led colonists to abandon the region and retreat to Salem, Massachusetts. The campaign is most notable for Richard Waldron entering the war, the death of Chief Mog, and the attack on the Mi’kmaq that initiated their involvement in the war.

== Historical context ==
Jean-Vincent d'Abbadie de Saint-Castin was ordered by the Governor of Quebec to organize all the natives "throughout the whole colony of Acadia to adopt the interests of the king of France." Historian Georges Salagnac writes that, "One may reasonably suppose that Saint-Castin began to exercise his talents as a military counsellor on the occasion of this war." The people of Boston thought Castin was influencing the Wabanaki strategy and supplying them with superior equipment. The campaign of 1676 followed the one of 1675.

== The campaign ==
On August 11, a Wabanaki attack on Falmouth resulted in 34 settlers being killed or captured. On August 13, the Wabanaki attacked Richard Hammond's fortified house in present-day Woolwich, killing fourteen, while two escaped. The following day, they raided the best fortified settlement in the region, the trading post of Thomas Clarke and Thomas Lake near Woolwich on Arrosic Island, killing Thomas Lake and others while Sylvanus Davis escaped. (Major Waldron arrived the following February and found Lake's body frozen and sent it to Boston to be buried. He also removed two cannon.) Several weeks later, on September 2, the Wabanaki secured a garrison on Jewells Island in Casco Bay.

The Wabanaki also attacked a settlement at Sheepscot River at Merrymeeting Bay. William Phips rescued local settlers by bringing them on board his ship, forgoing his cargo of lumber. Although he was financially ruined (the Wabanaki having destroyed the shipyard and his intended cargo), he was seen as a hero in Boston. On September 7, 1676, Richard Waldon tricked 200 Wabanaki who believed they were meeting with him to establish a peace. They were disarmed without any deaths on either side. Seven or eight Indians accused of killing settlers were hanged, and the rest were sold into slavery. On September 24 and 25, the Wabanaki raided Wells twice, killing a total of three people. Also on September 25, they raided York, Maine, killing 40 people.

On October 12, 1676, at present-day Scarborough (formerly Black Point), led by Chief Mog, the Wabanaki laid siege to the garrison, which was immediately abandoned by the colonists. Waldron gave the order to seize all the Wabanaki "of the East" who had been raiding the New England villages along the border with Acadia. On November 9, 1676, American militiamen stopped at Machias and took nine Wabanaki captive. They sailed to Cape Sable Island (Nova Scotia) and 17 members of Mi’kmaq families were taken captive, including the local chief and his wife. They were taken as slaves and sold to the Portuguese in the Azores. The Wabanaki also destroyed Fort Pemaquid during the campaign.

== Afterward ==
The campaign was followed by the Northeast Coast campaign (1677).
