= Marie-Colombe Robichaud =

Canadian writer living in Nova Scotia (born 1943)

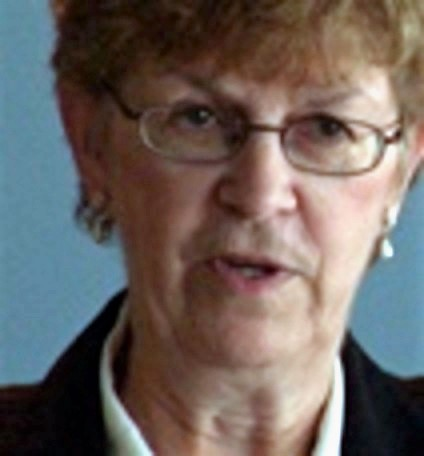
Marie-Colombe Robichaud

Marie-Colombe Robichaud (born 1943) is a Canadian writer living in Nova Scotia. Her work concerns itself with preserving the Acadian language and culture.

She was born in Chéticamp on Cape Breton Island. Robichaud founded the publishing company Les Éditions de la Piquine and the Théâtre de la Piquine. She has written and directed more than a dozen plays since 1995. She has also published several books on Acadian culture and history in both French and English. Her uncle Anselme Chiasson was also concerned with the preservation of Acadian culture.

== Selected works ==
- 100 Petites Histoires du Passé, pour conserver notre langue et notre culture acadienne (3 volumes)
- Acadian Tales From Bygone Days
- L'arrivée des Robichaud en Acadie
- The Robichauds in Acadia
- Théotime et les feux follets
- Thorns and Roses: An Acadian Life Story
