= Castine Hoard =

Trove of North American colonial coins found in Maine, United States

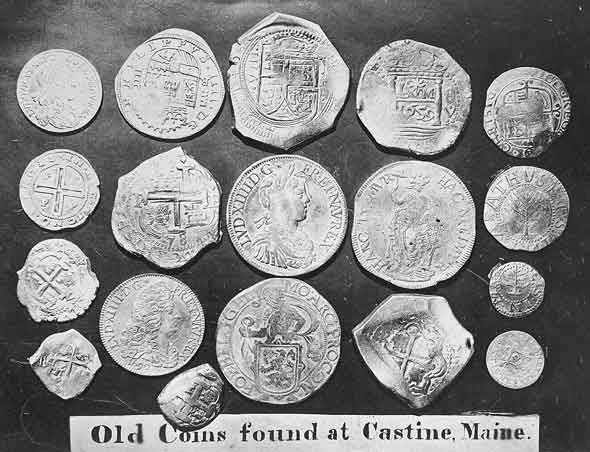
- A picture of a portion of the coins found
- Material: North American colonial coins
- Size: 500 - 2,000 coins (Est.)
- Created: 1642 to 1688
- Discovered: Castine, Maine in the 1840s
- Present location: Castine, Maine, a majority of the coins were dispersed over time.

The Castine Hoard (also known as The Castine Deposit) is the name given to a treasure trove of around 500–2,000 North American colonial coins that were found in Castine, Maine, United States. The coins were from various countries, and were buried sometime in the late 1600s. In the early 1840s the coins were discovered on a farm owned by the Grindle family.

== Origin ==
The coins were thought to have been a secret stash belonging to Baron Jean-Vincent d'Abbadie de Saint-Castin. Castin moved from France to the new world, becoming a battalion leader and later a baron following the death of his father. Jean eventually fell in love with the trading post of Pentagoet, and moved there once his army duties had been complete. While in Pentagoet he became more than friendly with the Indians, eventually becoming a local chief. Jean later married the daughter of another chief, and they had a daughter. In 1704, British forces led by Major Church stormed and captured the village of Pentagoet. Fearing the British would discover her father's stash, Jean's daughter buried the coins in a safer spot. She was captured within an hour and never returned to recover the money. Baron Jean Vincent, who was away on family business, died in France a few days after his daughter's capture.

== Location ==
The coins were discovered in 1840 by Captain Stephen Grindle and his son Samuel who unearthed the coins on their farm located near the Bagaduce River.

Catine Hoard was found, “on the banks or shore of the Bagaduce river, about six miles from the site of Castin's fort…about six miles above, is a point called Johnson's Narrows', or 'Second Narrows', where the water is of great depth, and at certain periods of the tide forms a rapid current. A path leads across the point, and from the adaptation of the shore as a landing place…Near the narrows the coins were discovered….Its situation was some twenty-five yards from the shore, and in the direct line of a beaten track through the bushes… At the termination of this path on the shore, is an indentation or landing place, well adapted for canoes, and the natural features and facilities of the spot are confirmatory of a tradition that one of the Indian routes from the peninsula to Mount Desert and Frenchman's Bay was up the Bagaduce river, and from thence across to Bluehill Bay….At the time the coins were found, Capt. Grindle, together with his father-in-law, Mr. Johnson, had resided on the farm for over sixty years. Portions of the top of the rock were embedded in the soil to the depth of a foot, and a clump of alders grew around. The appearance of the place is not now the same as when the discovery was made. Repeated digging has laid the rock bare to the depth of several feet, and the side hill has washed away.

== Contents ==
Between 1840 and 1841 hundreds of coins were unearthed; no record exists of a total figure but between 500 and 2,000 were believed to have been found. In 1859, a paper that was originally written by Joseph Williamson was published posthumously in which he describes the coins; "Most of the coins were French crowns, half-crowns, and quarters, all of the reigns of Louis XIII and Louis XIV, and bore various dates, from 1642 to 1682." The coin hoard was later found to contain coins from Spain, and included a large quantity of Spanish Cobbs. Also found were pine tree shilling's dating from 1652 produced by John Hull, as well as various coins from other countries. The earliest coin found was from the reign of King John IV, while the most recent coins dated no later than 1688. The coins were dispersed over time after their discovery, and by 1942 the Maine Historical Society had 26 of the coins remaining.

== See also ==
- List of hoards in North America
