= Northeast Coast campaign (1675) =

The Northeast Coast campaign of 1675 was conducted during the First Abenaki War (the northern theatre of King Philip's War) and involved the Wabanaki Confederacy raiding colonial American settlements along the New England Colonies/Acadia border in present-day Maine. Allied with French colonists in New France, they killed eighty colonists and burned many farms, blunting the tide of colonial British expansion in the north. Settlers deserted community after community, leaving only the settlements south of the Saco River to maintain an English presence in the region. Historian Georges Cerbelaud Salagnac writes, that Castine and the Abenaki “displayed consummate skill at it, holding in check at every point, from the Penobscot River to Salmon Falls, N.H., and even beyond, 700 regular troops, and even inflicting humiliating defeats upon them.” These raids were part of continuing warfare as the French and British fought for control in North America into the 18th century, as part of their rivalry in Europe.

== Historical context ==
Jean-Vincent d'Abbadie de Saint-Castin was sent from Quebec at the outset of the war with the Governors orders to organize all the natives "throughout the whole colony of Acadia to adopt the interests of the king of France.” After Saint-Castin had settled among the Abenaki, King Philip (also known as Pometacom or Metacomet) and his Wampanoag and allied warriors ravaged New England in the winter of 1675-1676. Historian Georges Salagnac writes that, “One may reasonably suppose that Saint-Castin began to exercise his talents as a military counsellor on the occasion of this war.” The people of Boston thought Castine was influencing the Wabanaki strategy and supplying them with superior arms.

== Campaign ==
On September 5, the Wabanaki made their first raid at present-day Topsham; they threatened settlers and destroyed a farm. Shortly after, the Androsconggin, Saco, and other Wabanaki warriors attacked various settlements along Casco Bay and farther south. On September 12, Wabanaki warriors attacked a farm in Falmouth, destroying it, killing six persons and taking one captive. On September 18, they raided Saco, burning homes and mills. When they attacked Major William Phillips's garrison at present-day Biddeford, six Abenaki were killed in the siege and 15 wounded. They also raided present-day Durham, New Hampshire, burning houses, killing two settlers and taking others captive. Along the Saco river, they killed five more colonists. The colonists abandoned Winter Harbor.

On October 1, the Wabanaki raided present-day Berwick, taking two children captive. Two weeks later, on October 16, some 300 natives attacked Berwick again, killing two settlers and several militia. Two days later, they attacked again, killing three colonists. They also destroyed seven houses and killed several persons in present-day Scarborough (formerly Black Point). Finally they attacked Wells, killing three and burning a house.

== Afterward ==
The campaign was followed by others in 1676 and 1677. Other warfare followed in Queen Anne's War of the early 1700s.
