= Carleton Corner =

Human settlement in Nova Scotia, Canada

Coordinates: 44°49′0″N 65°17′0″W

Carleton Corner in Nova Scotia

Carleton Corner is a community in the Canadian province of Nova Scotia, located in Annapolis County adjacent to Bridgetown. It is a designated place with a population of 99 in 2021. It is on Nova Scotia Route 201.

This village was the site of the Battle of Bloody Creek (1711) and the Battle of Bloody Creek (1757). The Morse cemetery is a private family cemetery created in 1790, and is now designated a provincial heritage property. It is surrounded by a vintage wrought iron fence, and the graves of descendants of New England Planters Abner and Anna Morse bear grave markers from the period 1793 to 1924.

== Demographics ==
In the 2021 Census of Population conducted by Statistics Canada, Carleton Corner had a population of 99 living in 44 of its 47 total private dwellings, a change of -6.6% from its 2016 population of 106. With a land area of 0.66 km^{2} (0.25 sq mi), it had a population density of 150.0/km^{2} (388.5/sq mi) in 2021.
