= Bernard-Anselme d'Abbadie de Saint-Castin =

French military officer (1689–1720)

Bernard-Anselme d'Abbadie de Saint-Castin (French pronunciation: [bɛʁnaʁ ɑ̃sɛlmə dabadi də sɛ̃ kastɛ̃]; 1689–1720) was a French military officer serving in Acadia. He was a member of a successful privateering force at the time of Queen Anne's War, and led native and French forces in the defense of Acadia.

== Biography ==
Bernard-Anselme d'Abbadie de Saint-Castin was born in 1689 at Pentagouet (site of present-day Castine, Maine) and was the son of Jean-Vincent d'Abbadie de Saint-Castin, third Baron de Saint-Castin, and Pidianske, an Abenaki woman. Bernard-Anselme's brother was Joseph d'Abbadie de Saint-Castin, an Acadian military chief. After his father's departure for France in 1701, relations with the Abenaki people began to fray.

In 1704, Governor Brouillan asked Bernard-Anselme, then just 15 years old, to rally his tribe to help protect Acadia from British attacks. In 1707, this request paid off and Bernard-Anselme fiercely help defend Port Royal against a siege by British colonial forces. On October 31 that same year, Bernard-Anselme married Marie-Charlotte Damours de Chauffours in Port Royal. In 1708, Bernard-Anselme received a promotion within the military, rising to the rank of lieutenant.

In 1709, a privateering force, of which Bernard-Anselme was a member, sank 35 British ships and took 470 people prisoner. Whilst Saint-Castin was at sea in 1710, Port Royal fell to the British and was renamed Annapolis Royal. Saint-Castin, who was unaware of these events, returned from his privateering to Port Royal. His ship was captured, but Saint-Castin escaped into the woods.

Saint-Castin was then appointed to command the whole of Acadia's military in an attempt to drive out the British. He was ordered to keep the First Nations hostile to the British, and in immediately after the Battle of Bloody Creek in 1711 his Abenakis unsuccessfully attacked Annapolis Royal.

However, in 1713 the Treaty of Utrecht was signed, ending the war. During the winter of 1713-14, Saint-Castin lived with his tribe on the Penobscot River. In 1714, Saint-Castin and his wife set sail for France, landing at Béarn late that year. He died there in the autumn of 1720.

By his marriage with Marie-Charlotte Damours de Chauffours he had only three children, all daughters: Marie-Anselme, born in 1711 at Quebec; Brigitte, who was a pupil of the Ursulines of Quebec; and Louise, born in 1716 at Pau. Bernard-Anselme’s widow lived at Pau until 1734 and died there, after sustaining a lawsuit before the parlement of Navarre.
