= Treaty of Casco (1703) =

1703 peace proposal in North America

Treaty of Casco (1703) was an unsuccessful attempt made by Governor Joseph Dudley of Massachusetts Bay Colony to prevent further Indian hostilities from breaking out along the northern frontier. War was already going on in Europe between England and France (see Queen Anne's War) and the eastern Indians were historically allies of New France, and had a close relationship with the French Jesuits.

Governor Dudley appointed a meeting of the several chiefs and their tribes to confer with him and his councilors to reconcile whatever differences had arisen since the last treaty. They met in New Casco, Maine (present day Falmouth, Maine), June 20, 1703. The Indians made the customary professions of peace, disavowing any conspiracy with the French to exterminate the English. They then presented the governor with a belt of wampum and ended the ceremony with an exchange of volleys.

The Treaty caused concern for the French, as it left them vulnerable in Acadia. Accordingly, Jacques-François de Monbeton de Brouillan, Governor of Acadia, urged the Governor of New France, Philippe de Rigaud, Marquis de Vaudreuil, to send a force to instigate hostilities between the Native Tribes and New England. Vaudreuil was equally concerned about losing control of the Kennebec-Chaudiere river system, which led to Quebec City. He raised a force of Canadians and Iroquois. In August 1703, this force, accompanied by a band of Abenakis, raided the New England frontier from Casco to Wells, killing or taking prisoner some 160 people. Further attacks were made during the autumn. The raids came as a complete surprise to New England. Governor Dudley responded by declaring war on the Abenakis, and offering £40 in scalp money.

== See also ==
- Treaty of Casco (1678)
