= Battle of Bloody Creek (1757) =

Battle of the French and Indian War in 1757

Coordinates: 44.8224°N 65.3095°W

- Part of the French and Indian War
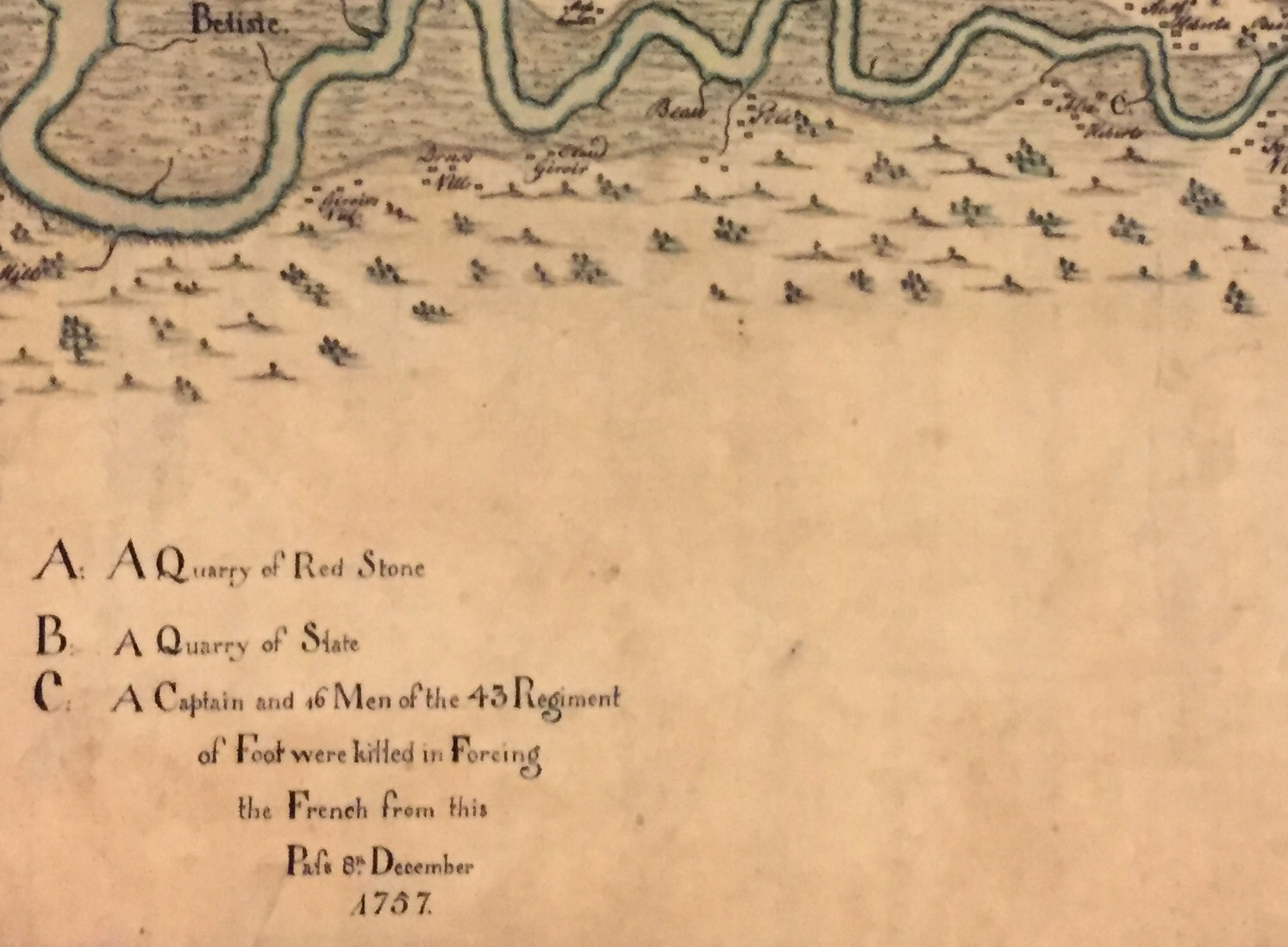
- The letter "C" at the top right marks the location of Battle of Bloody Creek, Annapolis River Map c.1759, Province House (Nova Scotia)
Date	December 8, 1757
Location	present-day Carleton Corner, Nova Scotia, Canada
Result	French and Native American victory

Belligerents
Great Britain	(Kingdom of France) France; Mi'kmaq militia Acadian militia

Commanders and leaders
Captain Peter Pigou †; Captain David Maitland	Acadian - Guillaume Jeanson

Strength
130 soldiers	Between 50 and 56 Acadians and Mi'kmaq

Casualties and losses
24 killed and wounded	12 killed and wounded

Designations

National Historic Site of Canada
- Official name: Bloody Creek National Historic Site of Canada
- Designated: 1930

The Battle of Bloody Creek was fought on December 8, 1757, during the French and Indian War. An Acadian and Mi'kmaq militia defeated a detachment of British soldiers of the 43rd Regiment at Bloody Creek (formerly René Forest River), which empties into the Annapolis River at present day Carleton Corner, Nova Scotia, Canada. The battle occurred at the same site as a battle in 1711 during Queen Anne's War.

== Prelude ==
Following the French defeat at the Battle of Fort Beauséjour and the start of the Great Expulsion in 1755, many Acadians formed guerrilla bands in the forests, often linking up with their historic Mi'kmaq allies. These bands operated throughout Nova Scotia until the fall of New France, the most famous guerrilla being Joseph Broussard, also known as Beausoleil. Despite controlling many strong points like Halifax, Annapolis Royal and Fort Beausejour, the British were unable to completely pacify the region.

On December 6, a work party from the 43rd Foot, which garrisoned Annapolis Royal, was cutting firewood near the site of the first battle in 1711 when they were ambushed by an Acadian and Mi'kmaq force. One man was killed and another seven were taken captive. In response, a detachment of 130 men under Captain Peter Pigou was dispatched to recover the prisoners.

== Battle ==
Led by Acadian Guillaume Jeanson, a group of Mi'kmaq and Acadians attacked the British force. Marching on foot along the south shore of the Annapolis River, the British force was exposed to wet and cold before giving up their search for the prisoners. They were crossing a bridge on the René Forêt River on the morning of December 8 when the Mi'kmaq and Acadians attacked. The British made a brief stand and suffered a high number of casualties, including Captain Pigou, before retreating back to Annapolis Royal.

== Aftermath ==
Despite their victory, the Mi'kmaq and Acadian guerrillas did not follow it up by attacking Annapolis Royal. There were however many similar bands that continued to harass and ambush British forces in Nova Scotia and assist French regular forces through the end of the war. The René Forest River was renamed Bloody Creek in commemoration of the battle.

The location of the battle is now a National Historic Site of Canada.

== See also ==
- Military history of Nova Scotia
- Siege of Louisbourg (1758)
- Military history of the Mi'kmaq people
