= Bernard Marot =

Bernard Marot (English: /mɑːˈroʊ/ mah-ROH, French: [bɛʁnaʁ maʁo]; fl. 1590–1650) was a French surgeon and ship's captain.

Marot arrived in Acadia in about 1610 and was located at Port-Royal as a qualified surgeon. In 1630, he was charge of restocking Charles de Saint-Étienne de la Tour at Cap de Sable for the Compagnie des Cent-Associés.

He also served Isaac de Razilly and, after Razilly's death, Charles de Menou d'Aulnay. In 1640, he went to reinforce the garrison at Fort Pentagouet for Charles de Menou.

Marot also acted as a privateer, trader and fisherman during his last known 20 years in Acadia, often without the knowledge of the authorities. Marot, and those like him, were important to the history of the time performing vital tasks to secure the settlements and advance the importance of the economy.
