= Joseph d'Abbadie de Saint-Castin =

Joseph d'Abbadie de Saint-Castin (French pronunciation: [ʒozɛf dabadi də sɛ̃ kastɛ̃]; fl. 1720–1746) was a French and Acadian military officer serving in Acadia. He was also an Abenaki chief.

His father was Jean-Vincent d'Abbadie de Saint-Castin and Joseph's brother was Bernard-Anselme d'Abbadie de Saint-Castin. Joseph was the younger brother of Bernard-Anselme, who was born in 1689. This suggests he was born in either 1690 or 1691. Joseph took tribal councils as a Sachem, along with his brother. When his brother went to France and never returned, Joseph remained with his Tarratine brethren, who were part of the Penobscot Tribe.

Baron Joseph was the Grandson of the great Penobscot Sachem Madockawando, he was Chief of the Tarratines on the Penobscot River.
