= Battle of Bloody Creek (1711) =

1711 engagement of Queen Anne's War 1711

Coordinates: 44.8224°N 65.3095°W

- Part of Queen Anne's War
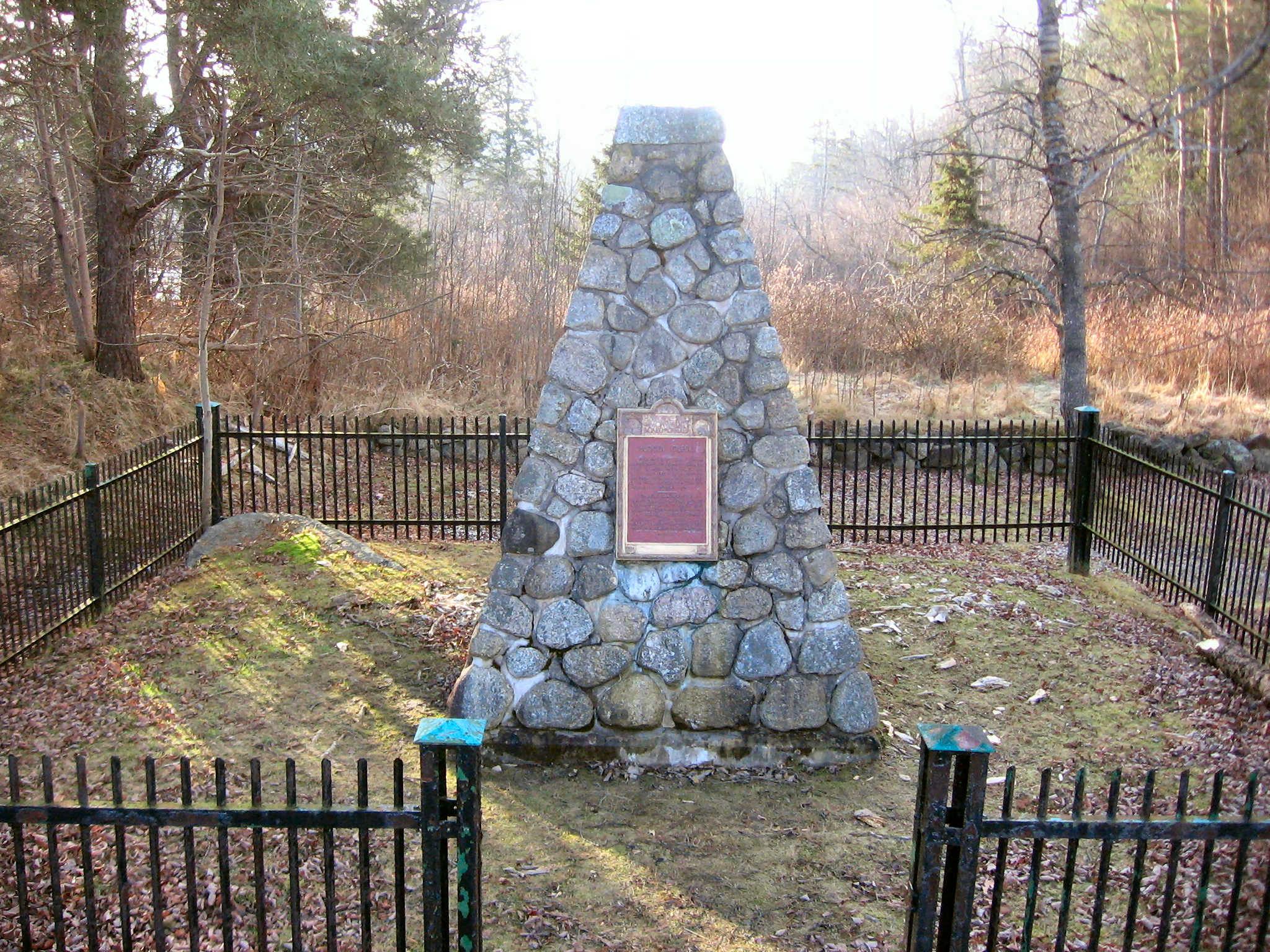
- Cairn erected in 1932 to commemorate the battle; demolished 25 Feb 2025
Date	10/21 June 1711
Location	modern-day Carleton Corner, Nova Scotia
Result	Wabanaki Confederacy victory

Belligerents
Wabanaki Confederacy	New England

Commanders and leaders
L'Aymalle	David Pigeon (surrendered)

Strength
50–150 Indian warriors	70 regulars

Casualties and losses
Unknown	16 killed 54 captured

Designations

National Historic Site of Canada
- Official name: Bloody Creek National Historic Site of Canada
- Designated: 1930

The Battle of Bloody Creek was a military engagement which was fought on 10/21 June 1711 (Note: French records, using the modern Gregorian calendar, indicate the date of this action as 21 June; English records, which were still using the Julian calendar, list it as happening on 10 June. In this article both dates are used; the Julian dates are 11 days before the Gregorian dates.) during Queen Anne's War. A Wabanaki Confederacy force of 50–150 warriors successfully ambushed 70 provincial troops of the British New England Colonies at a place that became known as Bloody Creek after the battles fought there. The creek empties into the Annapolis River at modern-day Carleton Corner, Nova Scotia, and was also the location of a battle in 1757.

The battle was part of an orchestrated attempt by the leaders of New France to weaken the British hold on Annapolis Royal. The British had only captured the fort the previous year and they only had a very tenuous control of the area. The battle, in which the entire New England force was captured or killed, emboldened the French and their Indian allies to blockade Annapolis Royal. Without heavy weapons, the force was unable to effectively attack the fort, and abandoned the siege when British reinforcements arrived by sea.

== Background ==
Port-Royal, the capital of the French colony of Acadia, was settled in 1605, and served as the colonial capital for much of the next hundred years. The settlement consequently became a focal point for conflict between the English New England Colonies and the Acadians for the next century. Port-Royal was destroyed in 1613 by English raiders led by Samuel Argall but eventually rebuilt. In 1690, the settlement was captured by provincial troops from the Province of Massachusetts Bay, although it was restored to France on 20 September 1697 under the terms of the Peace of Ryswick.

In the 1710 siege of Port Royal, a joint expedition of New England provincial troops and British marines led by Francis Nicholson again captured Port Royal. The town was renamed Annapolis Royal and the fort was renamed Fort Anne. This expedition left a garrison numbering about 450 men which consisted of a mixture of marines and provincial troops. The garrison was reinforced with more regular troops in the following months, though the British only held effective control over the fort and the nearby town. The terms of capitulation had included a provision in which the Acadians within 3 miles (4.8 km) of the fort were to be protected, provided they took an oath to the British Crown. A total of 481 Acadians were covered by this provision, but by mid-January 1711 only 57 had actually taken an oath.

When word of Port-Royal's capture reached France, chancellor of France Louis Phélypeaux ordered Antoine Gaulin, the French missionary to the Wabanaki Confederacy, to harass the British garrison at Annapolis Royal in order to frustrate their attempts to establish a firm foothold in the region. Bernard-Anselme d'Abbadie de Saint-Castin was given military command of Acadia and received similar orders.

== Prelude ==
The first winter was a particularly difficult one for the British garrison, which was reduced by early 1711 to about 240 "effective men Officers included" due to death, disease, and desertion. They had ongoing difficulty getting provisions and materials needed to repair the fort because of the reluctance of the Acadians to help. This reluctance was fueled in part by the activities of Saint-Castin and Gaulin — the Acadians in Annapolis Royal refused to do the necessary logging, citing the danger of Indian attacks. To counter this, the British began sending out armed parties to protect the loggers. These logging parties were sent into the woodlands up the Annapolis River, and the cut wood was floated down the river. In May 1711, Governor Samuel Vetch received reports that these work crews and others who supported the British were being harassed by Mi'kmaq and Abenakis opposed to British rule in the region. In his reports, he noted that the fort was "every day more and more Infested with skulking Indians", and that Acadians within the banlieu (the three-mile protection area) were being harassed. Desperate for timbers to repair the fort, Vetch organized a force of 70 New England provincial troops under Captain David Pigeon to accompany the fort's engineer on an expedition up the river. Pigeon's instructions were to assure the loggers that they would be paid and protected if they brought the timber down to the fort, but that there would be "severity" if they did not.

A modern map of Nova Scotia, showing the battle location

Not long before Pigeon's party set out, an Indian force organized by Gaulin and Saint-Castin arrived in the area north of Annapolis Royal, with instructions to harass and ambush the British when the opportunity presented itself. The exact size and composition of this force is not known with precision. Vetch reported it to be 150, but other sources reported it to be as low as 50 men. Many historians report that the force was composed of Abenakis, although Geoffrey Plank and others claim that the force also included some Mi'kmaq. Lieutenant Paul Mascarene perceived for a time that some local Acadians might have been involved, but thought this unlikely after learning of its recent arrival (literally the day before, according to one account) in the area. The identity and ethnicity of its leader is also uncertain; Governor Philippe de Rigaud, Marquis de Vaudreuil reported that it was led by someone named l'Aymalle.

== Battle ==
The New Englanders departed Annapolis Royal on 10/21 June in a whaleboat and two flatboats, going up the Annapolis River. Because they were delayed by the tide, word of the force's departure preceded them, giving the Indians time to set up an ambush near the mouth of what now is known as Bloody Creek. The whaleboat was faster on the water, and was about a mile (1.6 km) ahead of the flatboats when it reached the ambush site. The surprise was complete: all but one of the whaleboat's men were killed. Hearing the gunfire, the flatboats hurried to catch up, and carelessly made directly for the whaleboat. This exposed them to fire from Indians on the shore, and they suffered significant casualties before the New Englanders were surrounded and the survivors surrendered. Sixteen of Pigeon's men were killed and the rest, nine of which suffered injuries, were captured, including Pigeon himself. After being taken into captivity, Pigeon was forced to pay 800 livres for his ransom.

== Aftermath ==
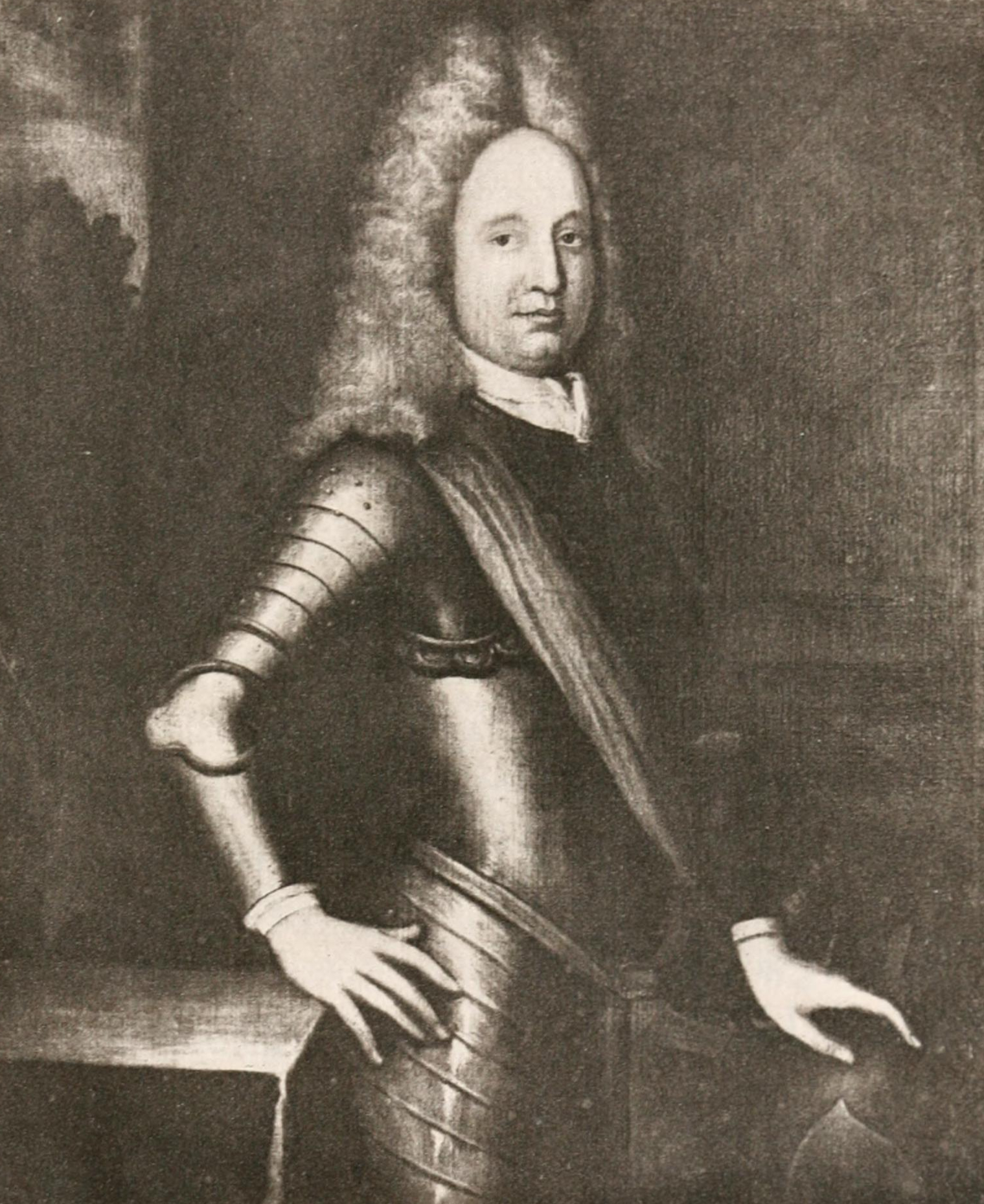
Samuel Vetch

The victory at Bloody Creek rallied the local Indians, and prompted many of the Acadians who were nominally under British protection to withdraw to the north. Soon thereafter a force of approximately 600 men, including Acadians, Abenaki, and Mi'kmaq, gathered and blockaded Fort Anne under the leadership of Gaulin and Saint-Castin. The defending garrison was small, but the attackers had no artillery and were thus unable to make an impression on the fort, and the fort was still accessible by sea. Gaulin went to Plaisance in Newfoundland for supplies and equipment to advance the siege; Governor Philippe Pastour de Costebelle sent a ship loaded with supplies, but it encountered a large British fleet and was captured. That same expedition abandoned its goal of attacking Quebec when eight of its ships were lost on the shores of the Saint Lawrence River; Vetch, who had accompanied the expedition as a leader of the provincial troops, returned to Annapolis Royal with 200 provincial soldiers, after which the besiegers withdrew.

Annapolis Royal remained in British hands for the remainder of the war, but the Acadians and local Indians continued to resist the British presence after peace was reached and Acadia was formally ceded to Britain with the 1713 Peace of Utrecht. This resistance was motivated by a French desire to recover Acadia and by the concerns of the Abenaki and Mi'kmaq, who had not been parties to Utrecht, to British colonial encroachment on their lands after the war ended. British disputes with the Indians led to Dummer's War in the 1720s; it was fought primarily in northern New England, but British colonial settlements in Nova Scotia were also attacked. The disputes between the French and British over Acadia and Nova Scotia were not resolved until the British victory in the Seven Years' War and the expulsion of the Acadians in the 1750s. The site was again the scene of battle during the Seven Years' War, and has been designated by the Canadian government as a National Historic Sites of Canada.

== See also ==
- Military history of Nova Scotia
