= Anselme Chiasson =

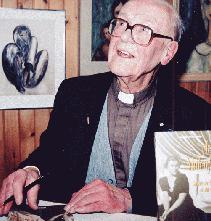
Anselme Chiasson

Anselme Chiasson (January 3, 1911 – April 25, 2004) was a Catholic priest, educator and writer in New Brunswick. Chiasson made significant contributions to the recording of Acadian history and folklore.

He was born in Chéticamp, Nova Scotia and studied at the Collège séraphique des Capucins in Ottawa and the Chapelle de la Réparation des Pères Capucins in Montreal. He was ordained a Capuchin priest in 1938. From 1941 to 1946, Chiasson was a professor in philosophy. From 1949 to 1957, he was a priest at Saint-François-d'Assise parish in Ottawa. From 1957 to 1959, Chiasson was a professor of theology.

He then moved to Moncton, New Brunswick, where he formed a convent for the Capuchin order. In 1960, with Fathers Clément Cormier and Emery LeBlanc, he founded the Société historique acadienne. In 1961, Chiasson founded the first Acadian publishing house. He helped create the Centre d'études acadiennes at the Université de Moncton and served as its director from 1974 to 1976. He also published several volumes of Chansons d'Acadie, collections of Acadian songs.

In 2003, Chiasson was named an officer in the Order of Canada. He was named a Chevalier in the Order of La Pléiade in 2002. In 1999, he was named a Chevalier in the French National Order of Merit. In 1979, he was named to the Ordre des francophones d'Amérique.

He died in Montreal at the age of 93.

== Selected works ==
- Chéticamp, histoire et traditions acadiennes (1961)
- L'Île de Chipagan : anecdotes, tours et légendes (1967)
- Légendes des Îles-de-la-Madeleine (1969)
- Histoire et traditions acadiennes (1972)
