= Guillaume Jeanson =

Guillaume Jeanson (sometimes William Johnson, Gilliom Shanson or Guillaume Jeançonne; August 1721 – after 1777) was an Acadian soldier and settler. Following the expulsion of the Acadians, Jeanson stayed in Acadia and led a group of Acadian irregulars harrying the British. By 1762, he and his family were prisoners of the British, but they were released the next year after the conclusion of the Seven Years' War. Following his release, he took an oath of allegiance to the British crown and was granted a parcel of land in what is now Grosses Coques.
