= Treaty of Casco (1678) =

Treaty between American Indians and English settlers

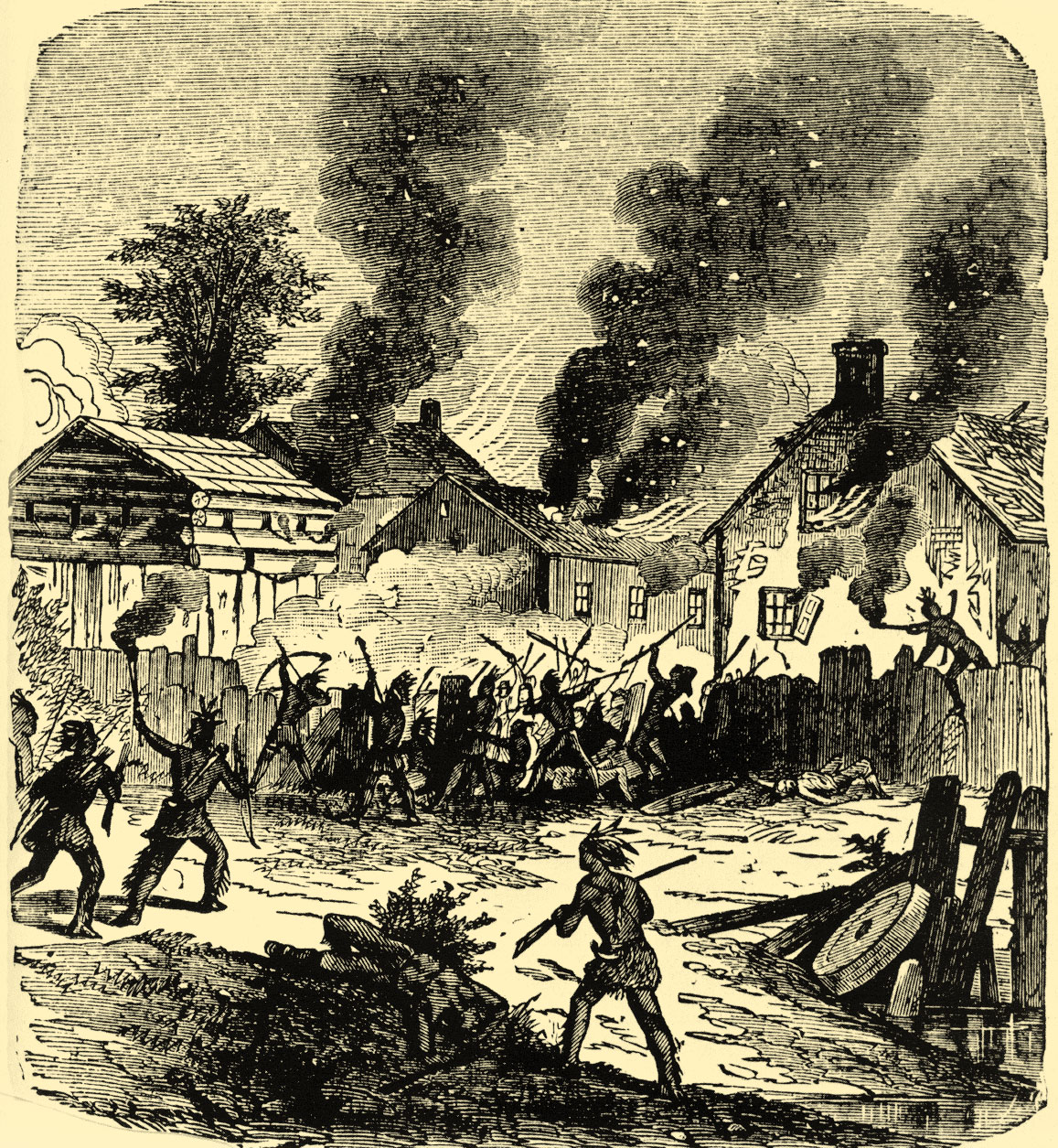
The Treaty of Casco was signed by American Indians and settlers after King Philip's War.

The Treaty of Casco (1678) was a treaty that brought to a close the war between the Indigenous Dawnland nations and the English settlers. There are no surviving copies of the treaty or its proceedings, so historians use a summary by Jeremy Belknap in his 1784 History of New Hampshire.

== Background ==
Most of Maine's English settlers were scattered among in settlements strung out along the coast or lower rivers. The Wabanaki north and east of the Kennebec River formed alliances with the French through the fur trade. By 1670, the Indigenous communities became increasingly frustrated with the settlers as a result of trade disputes, land encroachment, rum trading and free-roaming English livestock in their cornfields, which laid the foundation for future conflicts.

On 12 April 1678 the provincial government of New York, which controlled Maine between 1677 and 1686, signed the first Treaty of Casco with the Penobscot representatives, headed by Chief Madockawando. Under the terms of the treaty, English settlers paid rent to the Penobscots and were given back confiscated farm land, while the English agreed to respect the Penobscot land rights.

The treaty sought to re-establish the friendly relations between the Indigenous and settler communities that had characterized the northern settlements previous to the outbreak of King Philip's War in 1675. Based on the terms of the accord, all captives were to be surrendered without ransom. The treaty also recognized English property rights, but stipulated that the English should give the Indians one peck of corn annually for each family settled on Indian lands, with the exception of Maj. Phillips of Saco, a great proprietor, who was required to give a bushel for each Native American family. This land use tax symbolized continuing Abenaki sovereignty over Maine. The treaty also provided for closer government regulation of the fur trade. The Treaty included establishing Fort Charles at Pemaquid.

The English settlers refused to abide by the terms of the Treaty of Casco. Traders continued their old practices (including the sale of rum), while settlers placed fishing nets across the Saco River, preventing fish from migrating upriver to the Wabanaki villages, and livestock continued to trample through Indigenous cornfields. Negotiations and further treaty attempts, including the 1703 Treaty of Casco were ultimately unsuccessful and confrontations continued. This is said to have been the casus belli for the subsequent King William's War.

== Second treaty ==
The second Treaty of Casco (1703) was an unsuccessful attempt made by Governor Joseph Dudley of Massachusetts Bay Colony to prevent further Indian hostilities from breaking out along the northern frontier. War was already going on in Europe between England and France (see Queen Anne's War), while the eastern Dawnland nations were historically allies of New France and had a close relationship with the French Jesuits.

Governor Dudley appointed a meeting of the several chiefs and their tribes to confer with him and his councilors to reconcile whatever differences had arisen since the last treaty. They met in New Casco, Maine (present day Falmouth, Maine), 20 June 1703. The Wabanakik made the customary professions of peace, disavowing any conspiracy with the French to exterminate the English. They then presented the governor with a belt of wampum and ended the ceremony with an exchange of volleys.

The Treaty caused concern for the French, as it left them vulnerable in Acadia. Accordingly, Jacques-François de Monbeton de Brouillan, Governor of Acadia, urged the Governor of New France, Philippe de Rigaud, Marquis de Vaudreuil, to send a force to instigate hostilities between the Native Nations and New England. Vaudreuil was equally concerned about losing control of the Kennebec-Chaudiere river system, which led to Quebec City. He raised a force of Canadians and Haudenosaunee (Iroquois). In August 1703, this force, accompanied by a band of Abenakis, raided the New England frontier from Casco to Wells, killing or taking prisoner some 160 people. Further attacks were made during the autumn. The raids came as a complete surprise to New England. Governor Dudley responded by declaring war on the Abenakis, and offering £40 in scalp money.

== See also ==
- List of treaties
