= Jean-Vincent d'Abbadie de Saint-Castin =

French military officer (1652–1707)

Saint-Castin
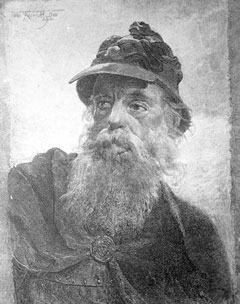
- Will H Lowe: Baron De St Castin, 1881
- Born: 1652; Escout, Béarn, Kingdom of France
- Died: 1707 (aged 54–55)
- Military career
- Allegiance: Kingdom of France, Abenaki
- Conflicts: Raid on Penobscot (1674); King Philip's War (1675–1676): French and Iroquois Wars; King William's War: Battle of Fort Loyal (1690); Siege of Pemaquid (1696)
- Other work: representative

Signature
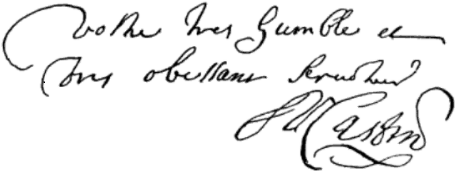

Jean-Vincent d'Abbadie, Baron de Saint-Castin (French pronunciation: [ʒɑ̃ vɛ̃sɑ̃ dabadi də sɛ̃ kastɛ̃]; 1652–1707) was a French military officer serving in Acadia and an Abenaki chief. He is the father of two prominent sons who were also military leaders in Acadia: Bernard-Anselme and Joseph. He is the namesake of Castine, Maine. He died at Pau, France, in 1707.

== Early life ==
Saint-Castin was born at Escout, Béarn, France, to Jean-Jacques d'Abbadie and Isabeau de Béarn-Bonasse, the youngest of three sons. Little is known of his early years other than he lost his mother in infancy and his father before his teens. He left for Canada at the age of thirteen as an ensign in the army, as was suitable for the youngest son of a noble.

He was likely part of Alexandre de Prouville's campaign against the Iroquois in 1666 although his name does not appear in surviving records until 1670 when he was part of the repossession of Acadia by the French. In the Penobscot River area he gained his knowledge of the Penobscot and was eventually adopted into a local tribe.

In 1674, along with the governor of Acadia, Castin was taken to Boston as a prisoner in the Dutch-led conquest of Acadia, who renamed the colony New Holland. After he returned from Boston, Governor Frontenac gave Castin the task of allying the Abenaki with the French, which he did. Together they recaptured the former capital of Acadia, Fort Pentagouet the following year (1675) during the Northeast Coast campaign of King Philips War. He took this role seriously and, while he became the third Baron de Saint-Castin on the death of his elder brother that year, he appears to have devoted his time to becoming an Abenaki.

During King William's War, after Benjamin Church successfully defended a group of English settlers at Falmouth, Maine in the autumn of 1689, Castin returned to the village in May 1690 with over 400 soldiers and destroyed the village.

== Family ==
=== Allegations of polygamy ===
Saint-Castin seems to have married at least one and possibly two different daughters of Penobscot chief, Madokawando, as described by French Acadian Governor de Menneval, December 1, 1687: "...being in the forest with them, since 1665, and having with him two daughters of the chief of these [Indians] by whom he has many children." Menneval suggests polygamy and some recent historians have upheld this view, at least insofar as Saint-Castin having married more than one daughter of Madockawando.

Writing a brief account of Saint-Castin within a decade of Menneval's account, Baron de Lahonton makes a point of countering rumours that Saint-Castin was a polygamist: “He has several daughters, who are, all of them, married very handsomely to Frenchmen… He has never changed his wife, by which means he meant to give the savages to understand, that God does not love inconstant folks.” Lahanton's itinerary, as he recorded it, did not take him to the Penobscot region. If Lahonton met Saint-Castin in person, it would have been far from Saint-Castin's home (perhaps in Quebec). By the mid sixteen-nineties, Lahonton had returned to Europe and written his account. Thus the “several daughters” already married by this time would seem to precede Castin's marriage in Penobscot in 1684, said to have been blessed by a Jesuit missionary. The woman Saint-Castin married in 1684 may have been a teen bride named Pidianske or Pidiwamiska or Marie-Mathilde or one of the former may have been changed to the latter as a baptismal name, or these names may refer to at least “two distinct women.”

=== Earlier children ===
At least one of the “several daughters” referred to by Baron de Lahonton may have been born as early as 1671. This daughter or an unidentified sister may have married a Frenchman with the last name Meunier.

=== Later children ===
Two sons became scions of the Saint-Castin name:, Bernard-Anselm (c. 1689 per Canada Biog. in French) and Joseph (c. 1690). Another son named Jean-Pierre died in Quebec while still a minor. Two of Saint-Castin's daughters, Thérèse and Anastasie, are said to have married on the same day, 4 December 1707.

== Later life ==
In 1700, the governor of Massachusetts wrote to England describing a conversation with John Alden in which Alden characterized Saint-Castin as a friend and correspondent who was always eager to trade and "professes great kindness to the English and speaks English." Alden stated Saint-Castin had recently told him "he hoped he should shortly come under the King of England's government, for that he would much rather be a subject of England than a slave to France." Saint-Castin was also quoted as saying the border with New France should be the St. Croix River. A much later message, in 1750, from the Boston council to one of Castin's sons, seems to give some support the idea that Castin was friendly, or at least could be shrewd in matters relative to Boston, as it refers to Saint-Castin's "good affection to us."

In 1701, Saint-Castin returned to France to answer charges of disloyalty that stemmed directly from Alden's characterization, and also to secure his baronial inheritance in France through court lawsuits. He died in France in 1707.

At some point prior to departure, Saint-Castin seems to have buried a large treasure of silver coins on a bank of the Bagaduce River, but without telling family or friends. (Or, if he told someone, they were unable to locate or take advantage, for whatever reason.) The buried treasure was not discovered until Anglophone inhabitants of Penobscot stumbled upon it almost 150 years later.

== Descendants ==
In 1714, Saint-Castin's son, Bernard-Anselme sailed to France with his wife Marie-Charlotte Damours de Chauffours and daughter. He sought to prove his legitimacy and secure his inheritance and baronial title. He subsequently died in 1720 and his wife and children remained in France.

Continuity of the Saint-Castin name in the Penobscot region falls to Saint-Castin's son Joseph. Joseph is referred to simply as “Casteen” in correspondence from 1725. As late as 1750, Joseph was corresponding with Lt. Gov. Spencer Phips, the adopted son of the former governor—and sometimes-nemesis of Castin—William Phips.

On 4 September 1707, his daughter, Anastasie, married a descendant of Acadian governors, the namesake son of Alexandre Le Borgne de Belle-Isle and grandson of Emmanuel Le Borgne. That same day, another daughter, Marie-Thérèse, was wed to Philippe Mius d’Entremont, the namesake grandson of Philippe Mius d’Entremont. Anastasie was reported as living with her husband near Port-Royal (Annapolis) in 1725. Another daughter was said to still be living on Mount Desert Island in 1735.

American singer Beyoncé is possibly a descendant of Saint-Castin. In 2025, Tina Knowles, the mother of Beyonce, confirmed in the prelude of her autobiography Matriarch that Beyonce is a Saint-Castin descendant.

Ancestors of Jean-Vincent d'Abbadie de Saint-Castin

8. Jean-Pierre d'Abbadie (1537–1609)
4. Bertrand D'Abbadie (1582–1636)
9. Bernadine de Luger (1560–1588)
2. Jean Jacques D'Abbadie (1 Nov 1620 – Feb 1662)
5. Marie (DeBidou) de Bidou (1598)
1. Jean-Vincent D'Abbadie (1652–1707)
24. BÉARN-BONASSE (de), François
12. Henri de Béarn (1556)
50. SACAZE, Pedro
25. SACAZE (de), Marie
51. SORGIAN, Gracie
6. Jacques DeBearn (c. 1600 – c. 1666)
13. Jeanne de Belzunce (1585)
3. Isabeau DeBearn Bonasse (1628–1652)
7. Madeleine (De Laàs) DeBearn (c. 1608 – c. 1652)

== Legacy ==
- Henry Wadsworth Longfellow (1807–1882) poem "The Baron of St. Castine".
- Namesake of Castine, Maine
- Namesake of Castine Way, Dalhousie University
- The Chase of Saint-Castin and Other Stories of the French in the New World by Mary Hartwell Catherwood (historic fiction)
- The Wilderness Baron: The French Noble Who Became an Indian Chief in Early 17th Century Maine by Dorothy Black

== See also ==
- Castine Hoard

== Sources ==
- Robert Le Blant, Une Figure légendaire de l’histoire acadienne : Le baron de Saint-Castin (Dax: P. Pradeu, 1934)
- Pierre Daviault, Le Baron de Saint-Castin, chef abénaquis (Montréal: Éditions de l’AC-F, 1939);
- Aline S. Taylor, The French Baron of Pentagouet: Baron St. Castin and the Struggle for Empire in Early New England (Camden, Maine: Picton Press, 1998);
- Marjolaine Saint-Pierre, Saint-Castin : Baron français, chef amérindien, 1652–1707 (Sillery, Quebec: Septentrion, 1999).
- Stanwood, Owen. Unlikely Imperialist: The Baron of Saint-Castin and the Transformation of the Northeastern Borderlands. French Colonial History, Volume 5, 2004, pp. 43–61
- Saint Castin, New Dominion Monthly. 1869
