= Military history of the Wolastoqiyik =

Coordinates: 45°59′53″N 67°29′40″W

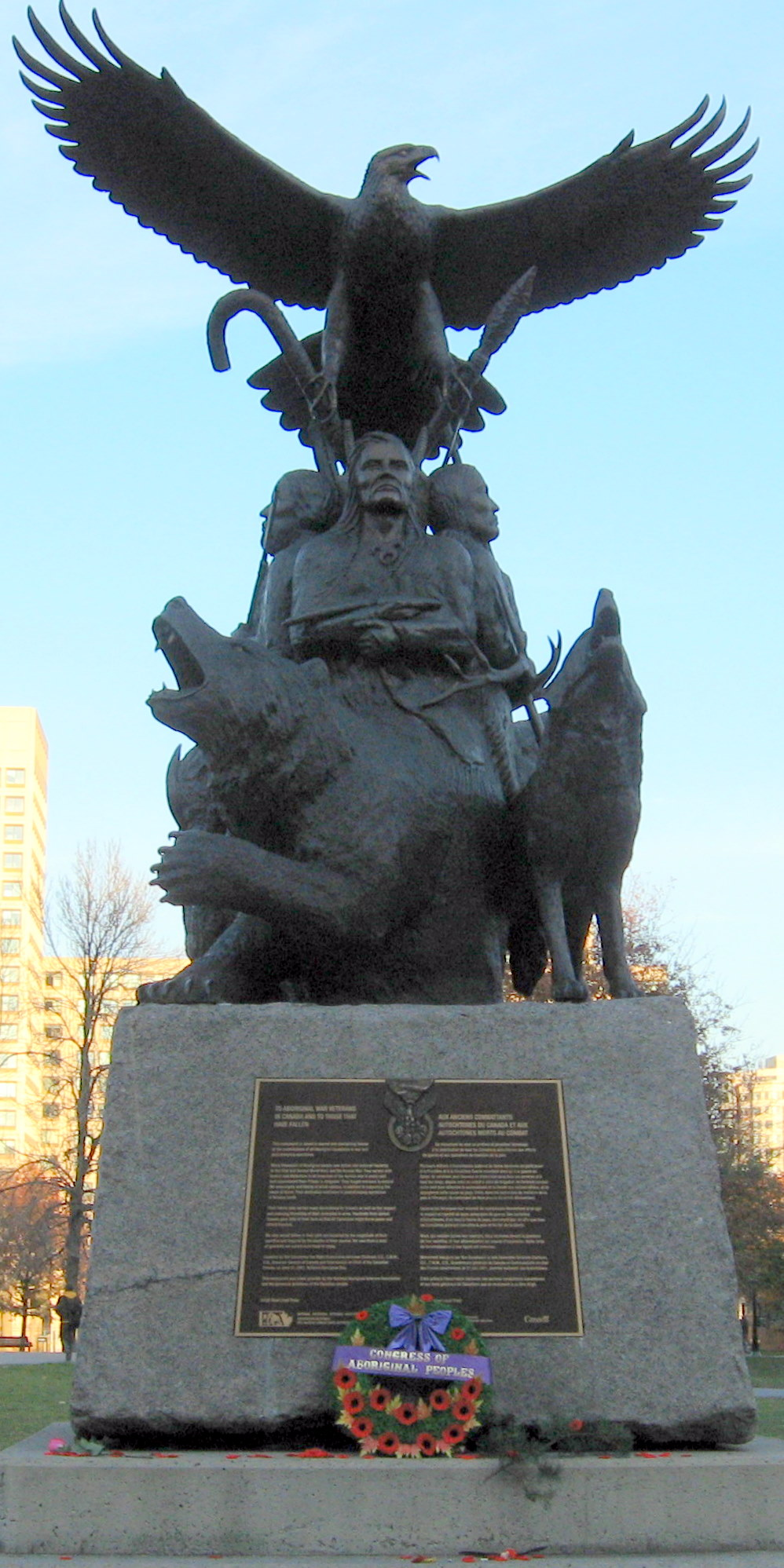
National Aboriginal Veterans Monument

The Wolastoqey militia was made up of warriors from the Wolastoqiyik of northeastern North America. Along with the Wabanaki Confederacy (particularly the Mi'kmaw militia), the French and Acadian militia, the Wolastoqiyik fought the British through six wars over a period of 75 years. They also mobilized against the British in the American Revolution. After confederation, Wolastoqey warriors eventually joined Canada's war efforts in World War I and World War II.

== 16th century ==
=== Battle at Bae de Bic ===
According to Jacques Cartier, the Battle at Bae de Bic happened in the spring of 1534, 100 Iroquois warriors massacred a group of 200 Mi'kmaq camped on Massacre Island in the St. Lawrence River. Bae de Bic was an annual gather place for the Mi'kmaq along the St. Lawrence. Mi'kmaw scouting parties notified the village that the Iroquois attack the evening before the morning attack. They evacuated 30 of the infirm and elderly and about 200 Mi'kmaq vacated their encampment on the shore and retreated to an island in the bay. They took cover in a cave on the island and covered the entrance with branches. The Iroquois arrived at the vacant village in the morning. Finding it vacated, they divided into search parties but failed to find the Mi'kmaq until the morning of the next day.

The Mi'kmaw warriors defended the tribe against the Iroquois assault. Initially, after many had been wounded on both sides, with the rising tide, the Mi'kmaq were able to repulse the assault and the Iroquois retreated to the mainland. The Mi'kmaq prepared a fortification on the island in preparation for the next assault at low tide. The Iroquois were again repulsed and treated to the mainland with the rising tide. By the following morning, the tide was again low and the Iroquois made their final approach. They had prepared arrows that carried fire which burned down the fortification and wiped out the Mi'kmaq. Twenty Iroquois were killed and thirty wounded in the battle. The Iroquois divided into two companies to return to their canoes on the Bouabouscache River.

=== Battle at Bouabouscache River ===
Just prior to Battle at Bae de Bic, the Iroquois warriors had left their canoes and hid their provisions on the Bouabousche River, which the Mi'kmaw scouts had discovered and recruited assistance from 25 Wolastoqi warriors. The Mi'kmaw and Wolastoqey militia ambushed the first company of Iroquois to arrive at the site. They killed ten and wounded five of the Iroquois warriors before the second company of Iroquois arrived and the Mi'kmaw/ Wolastoqey militia retreated to the woods unharmed.

Their canoes having been lost, 50 Iroquois, leaving twenty wounded behind, then regrouped to find their hidden provisions. Unable to find their supplies, at the end of the day they returned to the camp, the 20 wounded soldiers having been slaughtered by the Mi'kmaw/ Wolastoqey militia. The following morning, the 38 Iroquois warriors left their camp, killing twelve of their own wounded who would not be able to survive the long journey back to their village. 10 of the Mi'kmaq/ Wolastoqiyik stayed with the canoes and provisions while the remaining 15 pursued the Iroquois. The Mi'kmaw/ Wolastoqey militia pursued the Iroquois for three days, killing eleven of the wounded Iroquois stragglers.

=== Battle at Riviere Trois Pistoles ===
Shortly after the Battle at Bouabouscache River, the retreating Iroquois set up camp on the Riviere Trois Pistoles to build canoes to return to their village. An Iroquois hunting party was sent to hunt for food. The Mi'kmaw/ Wolastoqey militia killed the hunting party. The Iroquois went to find their missing hunting party and were ambushed by the Mi'kmaw/ Wolastoqey militia. They killed nine of the Iroquois, leaving 29 warriors who retreated to their camp on Riviere Trois Pistoles. The Mi'kmaw/ Wolastoqey militia divided into two companies and attacked the remaining Iroquois warriors. The battle left 3 Wolastoqey warriors dead and many others wounded. The Mi'kmaw/ Wolastoqey militia was victorious, however, killing all but six of the Iroquois, whom they took prisoner and later tortured and killed.

== King William's War ==
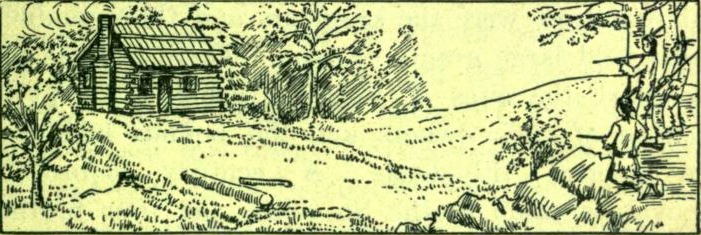
Wolastoqiyik and Mi'kmaq "attack on the [Maine] settlement" (c. 1690)

=== Siege of Pemaquid (1689) ===
The Wolastoqiyik from Fort Meductic participated in the Siege of Pemaquid (1689) Mehtawtik - Fin du chemin or End of the Path. The siege was a successful attack by a large band of Abenaki Indians from Forts Penobscot and Meductic on the English fort at Pemaquid, then the easternmost outpost of colonial Massachusetts (present-day Bristol, Maine). Possibly organized by the French-Abenaki leader Jean-Vincent d'Abbadie de Saint-Castin, the Indian force surrounded the fort, captured or killed most of the settlers outside it, and compelled its small garrison to surrender. On 4 August, they burned the fort and the nearby settlement of Jamestown down. One of the captives the Wolastoqiyik took back to their main village Meductic on the Saint John River was John Gyles. Gyles' brother James was also captured by the Penobscot and taken to Fort Penobscot (present-day Castine, Maine) where he was tortured and burned alive at the stake.

=== Battle of Fort Loyal (1690) ===
During King William's War, the Battle of Fort Loyal (20 May 1690) involved Mi'kmaq and Wolastoqiyik from Fort Meductic in New Brunswick capturing and destroying an English settlement on the Falmouth neck (site of present-day Portland, Maine), then part of the Massachusetts Bay Colony.

The earliest garrison at Falmouth was Fort Loyal (1678) in what was then the center of town, the foot of India Street. In May 1690, four hundred to five hundred French and Indian troops under the command of Hertel Portneuf and St. Castin attacked the settlement. Grossly outnumbered, the settlers held out for four days before surrendering. Eventually two hundred were murdered and left in a large heap by the site of the fort. When a fresh Indian war broke out in 1716, authorities decided to demolish the fort and evacuate the city rather than risk another catastrophe.

James Alexander was taken captive along with 100 other prisoners. Alexander was taken back to the Wolastoqey headquarters on the Saint John River at Meductic, New Brunswick. "James Alexander, a Jersey man," was, with John Gyles, tortured at an Indian village on the St. John River. In the spring of 1691, two families of Mi'kmaq, who had lost friends by some English fishermen, came these many miles to avenge themselves on the captives. They were reported to have yelled and danced around their victims; tossed and threw them; held them by the hair and beat them - sometimes with an axe - and did this all day, compelling them also to dance and sing, until at night they were thrown out exhausted. Alexander, after a second torture, ran to the woods, but hunger drove him back to his tormentors. His fate is unknown.

In 1693–1694, there swept over eastern Maine and New Brunswick a disease that proved very fatal to the Natives. Many of the warriors, including the chief of the Wolastoqiyik, died.

After the defeat in the Battle of Port Royal, Governor Joseph de Villebon moved the capital of Acadia to Fort Nashwaak on the St. John River for defensive purposes, and to better coordinate military attacks on New England with the natives at Meductic.

=== Raid on Oyster River ===
The Raid on Oyster River (also known as the Oyster River Massacre) happened during King William's War on 18 July 1694. In 1693, the English at Boston had entered into peace and trade negotiations with the Abenaki tribes in eastern Massachusetts. The French at Quebec under Governor Frontenac wished to disrupt the negotiations and sent Claude-Sébastien de Villieu in the fall of 1693 into present-day Maine, with orders to "place himself at the head of the Acadian Indians and lead them against the English." Villieu spent the winter at Fort Nashwaak (see siege of Fort Nashwaak). The Indian bands of the region were in general disagreement whether to attack the English or not, but after discussions by Villieu and cajoling by the Indians' priest Fr. Thury (and with support from Fr. Bigot), they went on the offensive.

The English settlement of Oyster River (present-day Durham, New Hampshire) was attacked by Villieu with about 250 Abenaki, composed of two main groups from Penobscot and the Norridgewock under command of their sagamore, Bomazeen (or Bomoseen). A number of Wolastoqiyik from Medoctec, led by Assacumbuit, took part in the attack. The Indian force was divided into two groups to attack the settlement, which was laid out on both sides of the Oyster River. Villieu led the Pentagoet and the Meductic/Nashwaaks. The attack commenced at daybreak, with the small forts quickly falling to the attackers. In all, 104 inhabitants were killed and 27 taken captive, with half the dwellings, including the garrisons, pillaged and burned to the ground. Crops were destroyed and livestock killed, causing famine and destitution for survivors.

=== Siege of Pemaquid (1696) ===
New France, led by Pierre Le Moyne d'Iberville, along with the Wolastoqey and Mi'kmaw militias fought a naval battle in the Bay of Fundy before moving on to raid Bristol, Maine again. In the lead up to this battle in Fundy Bay, on 5 July, 140 natives (Mi'kmaw and Wolastoqey), with Jacques Testard de Montigny and Chevalier, from their location of Manawoganish island, ambushed the crews of four English vessels. Some of the English were coming ashore in a long boat to get firewood. A native killed five of the nine men in the boat. The Mi'kmaq burned the vessel under the direction of Father Florentine (missionary to the Mi'kmaq at Chignectou).

=== Siege of Fort Nashwaak (1696) ===
The Wolastoqiyik from Meductic were also involved in protecting the Acadian capital Fort Nashwaak (present-day Fredericton, New Brunswick) from a New England attack. In the siege of Fort Nashwaak, Colonel Benjamin Church was the leader of the New England force of 400 men. The siege lasted two days, between 18 and 20 October 1696, and formed part of a larger expedition by Church against a number of other Acadian communities. Aware of the pending attack, on the 11 October, Governor Villebon made a request to Father Simon-Gérard de La Place to gather Wolastoqey militia from Meductic to defend the fort from an attack. On 16 October, Father Simon-Gérard and Acadian Sieur de Clignancourt of Aukpacque led 36 Wolastoqey militia members to Nashwaak to defend Fort Nashawaak. On 18 October, Church and his troops arrived opposite the fort, landed three cannons and assembled earthworks on the south bank of the Nashwaak River. Pierre Maisonnat dit Baptiste was there to defend the capital. Baptiste joined the Wolastoqiyik from Meductic for the duration of the siege. There was a fierce exchange of gunfire for two days, with the advantage going to the better sited French guns. The New Englanders were defeated, having suffered eight killed and seventeen wounded. The French lost one killed and two wounded.

In response to Church's failed siege, Acadian Rene d'Amour of Aukpacque and Father Simon-Gérard accompanied an expedition of the Wolastoqey militia (who joined Louis de Buade de Frontenac's expedition), which, although one of the largest gatherings of natives ever assembled in Acadia, did not, after all, accomplish very much.

== Father Rale's War ==
Father Rale's War was the first and only time Wabanaki would fight New Englanders and the British on their own terms and for their own reasons and not principally to defend French imperial interests. In response to Wabanaki hostilities toward territorial expansion, the governor of Nova Scotia, Richard Phillips, built a fort in traditional Mi'kmaw territory at Canso in 1720, and Massachusetts Governor Samuel Shute built forts on traditional Abenaki territory around the mouth of the Kennebec River: Fort George at Brunswick (1715); St. George's Fort at Thomaston (1720); and Fort Richmond (1721) at Richmond. The French claimed the same territory by building churches in the Abenaki villages of Norridgewock (on the Kennebec River) and Medoctec (on the St. John River, four miles upriver from present-day Meductic.

Dummer's treaty, made in Boston in 1726, afforded a momentary peace to the tribes of Acadia. Three chiefs and about twenty-six warriors from Medoctec went to Annapolis Royal, in May 1728, to ratify this treaty.

== King George's War ==
During King George's War, the Wolastoqiyik and Mi'kmaq sought revenge for the Ranger John Gorham's killing of Mi'kmaw families during the siege of Annapolis Royal (1744). During the siege of Annapolis Royal (1745) the Mi'kmaq and Wolastoqiyik took prisoner William Pote and some of Gorham's (Mohawk) Rangers. Among other places, Pote was taken to the Wolastoqey village of Aukpaque on the Saint John River. While at the village, Mi'kmaq from Nova Scotia arrived and on July 6, 1745, tortured him and a Mohawk ranger from Gorham's company named Jacob, as retribution for the killing of their family members by Gorham. On July 10, Pote witnessed another act of revenge when the Mi'kmaq tortured a Mohawk ranger from Gorham's company at Meductic.

In 1749, before the outbreak of Father Le Loutre's War, a deputation of Wolastoqiyik, including the chief of Medoctec, went to Halifax and renewed the treaty.

== French and Indian War ==
By the end of the 17th century, Meductic had a Jesuit mission and was incorporated into a French seigneury. The mission changed the landscape of Meductic, and by 1760 the Wolastoqiyik, who left to settle in other communities, abandoned the village.

After the close of the war, Meductic continued to decline. In 1767, Father Charles Fransois Baillie entered into his register: "The last Indian at Medoctec having died, I cause the bell and other articles to be transported to Ekpahaugh [Aukpaque]." (The bell eventually made it to the church of St. Ann at Kingsclear but was damaged by lightning in 1904. The bell was melted down into smaller bells. One is at St. Ann at Kingsclear and another at the Acadian Museum, University of Moncton.) By the time the Loyalists arrived in 1783, the chapel and fort were still standing.

== American Revolution ==
=== Maugerville Rebellion ===
During the American Revolution, in 1776, George Washington sent a letter to the Wolastoqiyik of the Saint John River asking for their support in their contest with Britain. Led by Chief Ambroise Saint Aubin, the Wolastoqiyik immediately began to plunder the British in the community of Maugerville, New Brunswick, burning some of their homes and taking others prisoner back to New England. (Shortly after, the rebellion continued at the nearby Battle of Fort Cumberland.) In 1779, Maugerville was raided again by Wolastoqiyik working with John Allan in Machias, Maine. A vessel was captured and two or three residents' homes were plundered. In response, a blockhouse was built at the mouth of Oromocto River named Fort Hughes (named after the Lt. Governor of NS Sir Richard Hughes).

=== St. John River expedition ===
During the St. John River expedition, American Patriot Col. John Allan's untiring efforts to gain the friendship and support of the Indians during the four weeks he had been at Aukpaque were somewhat successful. There was a significant exodus of Wolastoqiyik from the region to join the American forces at Machias. On Sunday, 13 July 1777, a party of between 400 and 500 men, women, and children, embarked in 128 canoes from the Old Fort Meduetic (8 miles below Woodstock) for Machias. The party arrived at a very opportune moment for the Americans and afforded material assistance in the defence of that post during the attack made by Sir George Collier from 13 to 15 August. The British did only minimal damage to the place, and the services of the Indians on the occasion earned for them the thanks of the council of Massachusetts.

== See also ==
- Military history of the Miꞌkmaq people
- Military history of the Acadians
- History of New Brunswick
