= Charles La Tourasse =

Canadian politician

Charles La Tourasse (1630–38 – 9 October 1696) was a sergeant in the French garrison at the time of the Battle of Port Royal.

Tourasse was born in France. William Phips placed him at the head of a council of locals (that notably included Alexandre Le Borgne de Belle-Isle) to govern the colony in his absence. Tourasse's tenure in authority ended with Joseph Robineau de Villebon's arrival, but Tourasse remained in command of Port Royal. Latourasse was killed by Benjamin Church in the Siege of Fort Nashwaak in Nova Scotia, around 9 October 1696, but the date is not firmly established.
