= Siege of Fort Nashwaak =

Action of King William's War

Coordinates: 45°57′48.9″N 66°38′35.2″W

Siege of Fort Nashwaak (1696)
- Part of King William's War
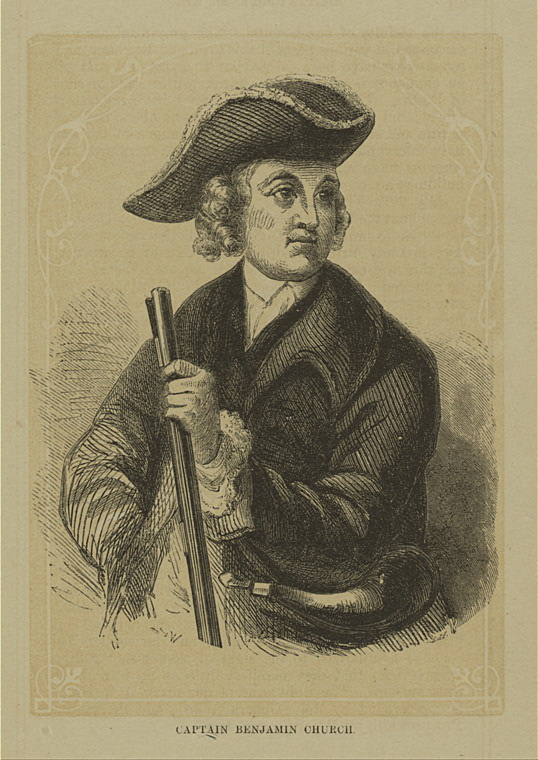
- Colonel Benjamin Church: Father of American ranging
Date	October 18–20, 1696
Location	Nashwaak, Acadia (present-day Fredericton, New Brunswick)
Result	French and Indian victory

Belligerents
France; Mi'kmaq; Acadians	New England

Commanders and leaders
Governor Villebon; Pierre Maisonnat dit Baptiste; Simon-Gérard de La Place; Rene Damours; Mathieu Damours; Charles La Tourasse †	Benjamin Church; John Hathorne

Strength
100	400 New England and native troops,

Casualties and losses
One killed and two wounded	Conflicting reports: British: 8 killed and 17 wounded; French report 20–25 killed many more wounded

The siege of Fort Nashwaak occurred during King William's War when New England forces from Boston attacked the capital of Acadia, Fort Nashwaak, at present-day Fredericton, New Brunswick. The siege was in retaliation for the French and Indian Siege of Pemaquid (1696) (at present-day Bristol, Maine) in the English Province of Massachusetts Bay. Colonel John Hathorne and Major Benjamin Church were the leaders of the New England force of 400 men. The siege lasted two days, between October 18–20, 1696, and formed part of a larger expedition by Church against a number of other Acadian communities.

== Historical context ==
During King William's War - the first of the four French and Indian Wars - French and Indians were victorious in the Siege of Pemaquid (1696) (present day Bristol, Maine) earlier that year. In the Siege of Pemaquid, the French and Indians had destroyed Fort William Henry, which the English colonial militia leader Benjamin Church himself assisted in erecting. In response to the defeat, the following month Benjamin Church led a devastating raid on Chignecto and then laid siege to the capital of Acadia, Fort Nashwaak in 1696.

Fort Nashwaak was a four-sided log palisade erected by Governor Villebon in 1691–92, who had decided to relocate the capital from Fort Jemseg as he felt a setting further up river would be safer from attack. Called by Villebon Fort St. Joseph, it was located on the north bank of the Nashwaak River at its junction with the Saint John River. The site offered the additional strategic benefits to Villebon of being situated near the Maliseet capital of Meductic and of being on a traditional portage route.

== Saint John River ==
First informed on October 1 by Sieur Chevalier that an English brig had entered the harbour at Saint John, Villebon sent Sieur Neuvillette, on October 5 with seven men, to reconnoiter the lower confines of the river and to carry supplies to Sieur Chevalier. On October 9, Neuvillette sent word back to Fort Nashwaak that six English vessels had entered the harbour at Saint John and landed two hundred English and Indian troops after successfully attacking Sieur Chevalier. On October 12, Neuvillette fell back to Fort Nashwaak and on the way picked up seven or eight French soldiers rescued by the Indians at Fort Nerepis (later known as Fort Boishebert) which was under attack by the English forces. The English continued their cautious approach and on October 16 were spotted by Sieur Neuvillette a short distance below Jemseg.

Governor Villebon having been alerted, had prepared his defences. Several days earlier, on October 11, Governor Villebon, made a request to Father Simon-Gérard de La Place to gather Maliseet militia from Meductic to defend the fort from an attack. On October 16, Father Simon and Acadian Sieur de Clignancourt led 36 Maliseet militia members to Nashwaak to defend Fort Nashawaak. In further preparation to defend his position, Villebon cleared his field of fire by dismantling a house, hid surplus powder in hidden caches, and assigned his men to their positions.

== Siege ==
On October 18 the English troops arrived opposite the fort, landed three cannons (two being used with some effect with the third unable to function effectively as it had been positioned too close, taking heavy musket fire from Villebon's forces) and assembled earthworks on the south bank of the Nashwaak River. Baptiste was there to defend the capital, having arrived at the Fort on Oct 17 with ten Saint John River Acadian settlers. Baptiste joined the Maliseet from Meductic for the duration of the siege. There was a fierce exchange of cannon fire for two days, with the advantage going to the better sited French guns. In addition to the opposing cannonades, Sr. Clignancourt and Sr. Baptiste with the Mi'kmaq allies confronted a force of English allied Indians advancing along the Nashwaak River.

On the second day of the siege at about noon M. de Falaise arrived from Quebec and immediately placed his arms against the English. The French were able to knock out one English cannon and slow the English fire of the last cannon due to continuous fire from the fort. The New Englanders were defeated (having suffered 8 killed and 17 wounded) and evacuated their position, retreating down the river. The French harassed the English retreat, keeping up musket fire and making them believe the Indians were following them. The French lost one killed and two wounded including Mathieu d'Amours.

== Aftermath ==
In response to Church's failed siege, Acadian Rene d'Amour of Aukpacque and Father Simon-Gérard accompanied an expedition of the Maliseet militia, which, although one of the largest gatherings of natives ever assembled in Acadia, did not, after all, accomplish very much.

By withdrawing from the Siege of Fort Nashwaak, the British gave up two small boats. Baptiste used them to head to Grand Pre. While in Grand Pre he armed the vessels and recruited Acadian crew members to make a descent on the coast of New England. In March 1697 Baptiste had captured eight English fishing vessels within three leagues of Casco Bay. Bapiste was injured three times in the raid, however, he was able to capture the vessels and took many prisoners. Two New England privateer ships arrived at the scene but Baptiste was able to beat them back and safely return to Grand Pre with his prizes.

Church threatened the Acadians at Chignecto before leaving that he would return if more New Englanders suffered. He did return to raid Chignecto again during Queen Anne's War in a campaign against Acadia that also included the Raid on Grand Pre. Two years later the capital of Acadia moved briefly to Saint John and then returned to Port Royal, Nova Scotia.

== See also ==
- Military history of the Maliseet people
- Military history of New Brunswick
- Military history of Nova Scotia
