= Simon-Gérard de La Place =

French priest

Simon-Gérard de La Place (1657–1 January 1699) (Note: de La Place was baptised Jean de la Place on 16 August 1657 at Rouen. He was the second child of 18 of Pierre de La Place and Marie Le Couteux. He is sometimes referred to, incorrectly, as Simon Girard de La Place.) was a 17th-century French priest and missionary who served in Acadia, the French province in what is modern north-eastern Canada. He participated in King William's War against English-led forces in Acadia.

== Missionary ==
La Place was baptised with the name Jean at Rouen in Normandy in August 1657 and joined the Recollets in south-west France between 1673 and 1675. He was ordained in September 1679 at Sens in Yonne, taking the name Simon-Gérard on joining the order. He was appointed as a missionary to New France and landed at Quebec on 25 August 1683, initially staying at the Convent of Notre-Dame des Anges. At some point after 1688, (Note: Some sources have La Place first at Meductic in 1687 or 1688, some in 1689, although it is believed that he left for Anticosti Island in 1689. He certainly returned to Meductic in the summer of 1693.) La Place was sent to Meductic in what is now New Brunswick as a missionary to the Maliseet First Nation. He was the first known missionary in the area of the Saint John River.

La Place was considered a skilled missionary, described by contemporaries as a "very conscientious man, who only concerns himself with the affairs of his mission" and as a man who "might be relied on, he being a very honest man". He is frequently mentioned in the writings of John Gyles in favourable terms. Gyles, who had been captured by the Maliseet and credited La Place with convincing his captors to keep him alive, described La Place as "a gentleman of a humane, generous disposition".

== Role in King William's War ==
After initially having little to do with the events of the King William's War, La Place began to take an active role in 1696, coordinating the movements of Maliseet warriors. During the same year he took part in the French-led expedition against English forces at Pemaquid as chaplain to 150 Maliseet fighters, leading a group of 50 warriors during the successful capture of the English fort. After the battle he travelled to Fort Nashwaak, the capital of Acadia. After learning of an English-led expedition to besiege Fort Nashwaak, Governor Villebon sent La Place to gather Maliseet fighters to help defend the fort. After between 30 and 36 fighters were led to Nashwaak, La Place was at the fort during the Siege of Fort Nashwaak in October and then spent the winter of 1696–97 as acting chaplain at the capital before accompanying a raiding party of First Nations fighters against English settlements in New England.

== Death ==
During late 1698 La Place fell out of favour with Villebon after he complained about the behaviour of two of the Governor's brothers who he considered were engaged in relationships with young First Nation women. Villebon asked for La Place to be replaced, but the Recollet became unwell after the siege and died on 1 January 1699 aged 41. His body was taken to Quebec, where it was met by 4,000 mourners led by Marquis de la Roche-Mesgouez, the Lieutenant General of New France, and buried in a Recollet church in the city.

Two of Simon-Gérard's brothers, Eustache and Louis-Hyacinthe de La Place, also joined the Recollets. (Note: Eustache was born Louis de La Place and was the fifth child of the family.) Louis-Hyacinthe was provincial commissioner of Quebec between 1710 and 1720. (Note: Louis-Hyacinthe de La Place was born at Rouen in February 1673, the 14th child of the family, and baptised as Jean-Claude de La Place. He joined the Recollet order in 1691 and died at Versailles in 1737 aged 64.)
