= John Gyles =

American soldier and interpreter

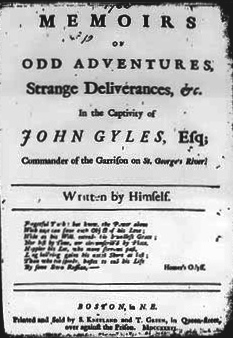
John Gyles Memoirs (1736)

John Gyles (c.1680 at Pemaquid, Maine—1755 at Roxbury, Boston) was an interpreter and soldier, most known for his account of his experiences with the Maliseet tribes at their headquarters at Meductic, on the Saint John River.

== King William's War ==
During King William's War, in 1689, when he was nine years of age, he was living with his family at Fort Charles. On 2 August, while labouring with his father Thomas near the new fort, he was taken prisoner by Maliseets in the Siege of Pemaquid (1689). His father was killed, one brother James was taken by the Penobscot, and only one brother escaped. John was conveyed up the Penobscot River, across portages to the Chiputneticook Lakes, and on to the main Maliseet village Meductic.

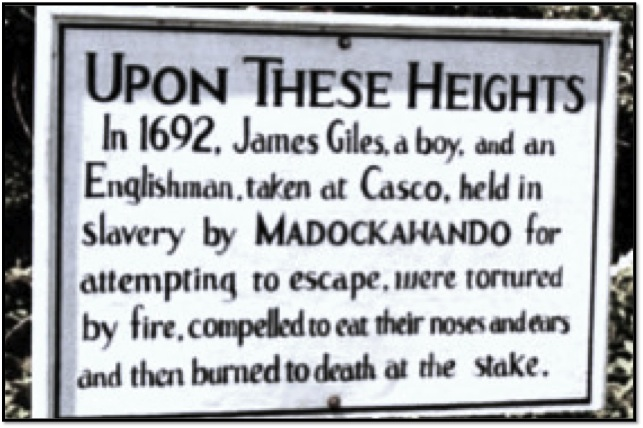
Sign at site of death of John Gyles' brother, Dyce Head Lighthouse Rd., Castine, Maine

For six years, Gyles was a slave to the Maliseets. He was forced to serve as drudge to one of the many small hunting parties that moved as far north as Gaspésie and endured harsh treatment.

His fortunes greatly improved in the summer of 1695 when he was sold to Louis D'Amours de Chauffours, who had a seigneury at Jemseg. John hunted and traded for D'Amours and worked in his store. In October 1696, the English came up the Saint John River to attack the capital of Acadia in the Siege of Fort Nashwaak (1696). D'Amours was in France at the time, but Gyles helped to save his master's house from destruction. He posted on the door a statement, written by D'Amours' wife, that English captives had been treated kindly there. After the Treaty of Ryswick, Gyles was delivered to the captain of an English vessel at the mouth of the Saint John and sailed for Boston, where he arrived on 19 June 1698.

== Queen Anne's War ==
Gyles' knowledge of and fluency in the Indian dialects of Acadia made him invaluable to the governing authorities of New England when war broke out again in 1701. During Queen Anne's War, he was with March in the Northeast Coast Campaign (1703). He served as an interpreter under many flags of truce, sailed with Major Benjamin Church in 1704, and fought with Colonel John March at the Siege of Port Royal (1707).

== Dummer's War ==
Most of his later life was given to military service and liaison with the Indians. In 1715 he helped construct Fort George at Brunswick; which was attacked in 1722. He remained to command the fort throughout Dummer's War, until 1725. He finished his military career as commander of the New England garrison on Fort St. George (Thomaston, Maine).

He married his first wife, Ruth True, in 1703 and his second, Hannah Heath in 1722.

== Legacy ==
In 1736 Gyles published his memoirs of his adventures. First printed in Boston in 1736, it was reprinted in 1853 and in 1875, and used as the basis for a modern adaptation of the memoirs by Stuart Trueman in 1966.

Gyles Cove, north of Hillman in York County, New Brunswick was named for him.

The memoirs are considered a precursor to the frontier romances of James Fenimore Cooper, William Gilmore Simms, and Robert Montgomery Bird.

A play was produced about his life called John Gyles: an Indian Experience by Theatre New Brunswick's Young Company in 1978.

== See also ==
- Captivity Narratives - Nova Scotia
