= Joseph Aubery =

French Jesuit missionary (1673-1755)

Joseph Aubery (born at Gisors in the Province of Normandy, 10 May 1673; died at Saint-François, New France, 2 July 1755 was a French Jesuit missionary in Canada. Chateaubriand reproduces the life-story of Father Aubery in the character of the missionary in his Atala.

== Life ==
Joseph Aubery was born 10 May 1673 at Gisors in Normandy. At the age of seventeen he entered the Society of Jesus, and for four years studied in Paris. He arrived in Canada in 1694 and completed his studies at Quebec where he was also instructor for five years, and where he was ordained in September 1699. He studied the Abenaki language at the Sault de la Chaudière mission. An unpublished French-Abenaki dictionary came to light in the twentieth century.

Assigned to the Abenaki mission, he re-established in 1701 the mission at Medoctec. It was on the Saint John River, at Hay's Creek, and appears to have been abandoned by the Franciscans about a year earlier. The mission was named for Francis de Sales.

In 1709 he was given charge of the Abenaki reduction at St. François. Aubery helped negotiate between the English and the Indians the Treaty of Casco in June 1727, obtaining better terms than those offered the year before. He remained at the St. Francis mission for nearly half a century.

== Works ==
He wrote several memorials in opposition to the claims of the English in Acadia, and sent them to the French Government, urging that the boundary between the French and English possessions should be determined by mutual agreement. To these memorials he added a map, giving the boundaries as defined by the treaty of Utrecht. His plan, however, was little regarded. These documents were preserved in the Paris archives. Other manuscripts, with the mission registers, were destroyed by fire in 1759.

== Sources ==
- "Joseph Aubery". Dictionary of Canadian Biography (online ed.). University of Toronto Press. 1979–2016.
