= Pierre Maisonnat dit Baptiste =

French privateer in Acadia (1663–1714)

Pierre Maisonnat dit Baptiste (born in Bergerac, France 1663, died in Acadia after August 1714) was a French privateer famous for the success he had against New England merchant shipping and fishing interests during King William's War and Queen Anne's War. Baptiste's crew members were primarily Acadians.

== King William's War ==
=== Battle of Port Royal (1690) ===
During King William's War, Baptiste fought in the Battle of Port Royal (1690). On May 9, 1690 English forces under Sir William Phipps attacked the capital of Acadia of Port Royal with a fleet of seven vessels and 700 men. Baptiste was among only 85 men defending an unfinished fortification at Port Royal. After spending 12 days pillaging Port Royal, Phipps' troops pillaged the rest of Acadia, including Castine, La Hève, Chedabucto and the settlements at the head of the Bay of Fundy. Baptiste was taken prisoner along with other Acadians but shortly after escaped.

Upon Baptiste's return to Acadia, Governor Joseph Robineau de Villebon commissioned him to protect Acadian interests as a privateer. Baptiste set off to prey on the busy and dangerous shipping lanes off Boston Harbour. On his first mission, he took eight ships, including a brigantine within sight of Boston. He received much praise from the Governor of New France Comte de Frontenac.

As a result of his success, Baptiste was given command of a fast warship named Bonne. In early June 1694, Baptist arrived at Cape Sable and scattered the New England fishing fleet, taking five vessels into Fort Jemseg on the Saint John River.

He followed up this initiative in July 1694 by returning to Boston and sank a few vessels that were too small to be worthwhile prizes, while capturing three that were. In 1694, over a three-month period, he captured 10 vessels. Six months later, January 1695, he returned to Saint John River with more prizes that he had captured. Fear of Baptiste is reported to have kept 400 New England fishing vessels tied up guarding their coasts. All the English settlers fled from coastal Maine to safety further south.

On May 24, 1695, returning from Boston with more prizes, Baptiste ran into an English war ship. Baptiste ran his vessel aground and fought. Cannon fire raged throughout the day, the English ship was crippling Bonne. Having lost the ship Bonne, Baptiste went ashore and walked to Villebon at Fort Nashwaak on the Saint John River.

=== Battle at Baie des Espagnols (1695) ===
In May 1695, Baptiste came across an English frigate at Baie des Espagnols (Sydney, Cape Breton) and immediately engaged it in battle. The English frigate overwhelmed Baptiste's vessel forcing him to run it aground and then abandon it.

=== Raid on Pemaquid (1696) ===
In the summer of 1696, Baptiste led Pierre Le Moyne d'Iberville's expedition out of Acadia to attack strongholds on the New England coast. After having captured two frigates at the mouth of the Saint John River, the first target was the vitally important port at Pemaquid (present day Bristol, Maine). The port was protected by Fort William Henry (also known as Fort Pemaquid). Baptiste and the expedition soundly destroyed the fort and dismantled it. Acadia became a source of torment for the settlers of New England.

=== Siege of Fort Nashwaak (1696) ===
Within weeks of the attack on Pemaquid, the New Englanders struck back. In 1696 an expedition under command of Colonel John Hathorn and accompanied by Major Benjamin Church set out to destroy the capital of Acadia Fort Nashwaak (present day Fredericton, New Brunswick; See Fort Nashwaak), then Acadia's capital. Villebon had been alerted and prepared his defences. On October 18 the New England troops arrived opposite the fort, landed three cannons and assembled earthworks on the south bank of the Nashwaak River. Baptiste was there to defend the capital. Baptiste joined the Indians and put himself at their head for the duration of the siege. There was a fierce exchange of fire for two days, with the advantage going to the better sited French guns. The New Englanders were defeated, having suffered 8 killed and 17 wounded. The French lost one killed and two wounded.

=== Raid on Casco Bay, Maine (1697) ===
By withdrawing from the Siege of Fort Nashwaak, the British gave up two small boats. Baptiste used them to head to Grand Pre. While in Grand Pré he armed the vessels and recruited Acadian crew members to make a descent on the coast of New England. In March 1697 Baptiste had captured eight English fishing vessels within three leagues of Casco Bay. Bapiste was injured three times in the raid, however, he was able to capture the vessels and took many prisoners. Two New England privateer ships arrived at the scene but Baptiste was able to beat them back and safely return to Grand Pré with his prizes.

In May 1697, Villebon again sent Baptiste to raid the New England ports. For a second time Baptiste was captured and imprisoned in Boston for over a year. Despite the official end of King William's War with the Treaty of Ryswick, the New Englanders were reluctant to release Baptiste. The European war ended in 1697 with the Treaty of Ryswick, but continued in New England for two more years.

Upon his release, in December 1698, Baptiste returned to Port Royal. Villebon made him captain of a small coast guard vessel and captain of the Port Royal militia. Baptiste was protecting Acadian fishing interests off of Acadia when he was captured in 1702 and again imprisoned in Boston on the eve of Queen Anne's War.

== Queen Anne's War ==
During Queen Anne's War, Queen Anne is reported to have ordered that no prisoners were to be exchanged and that Baptiste was to be hanged, because he was an officer of the garrison of Port Royal who had been made prisoner during peacetime, and who had then failed to recover his freedom, on the ground of his being a pirate. On hearing this, Governor of Plaisance (Placentia), Newfoundland Jacques-François de Monbeton de Brouillan sent an express messenger to Boston, to declare to the governor that he would retaliate if Baptiste was killed. This saved Baptiste's life.

Baptiste was kept in strict seclusion on Boston's Castle Island until 1706. New France and Acadia made significant diplomatic efforts to get him back, insisting that he be released as part of a prisoner exchange involving captives taken by French and Indian raiders in the 1704 Raid on Deerfield. Difficulties in obtaining Baptiste's release also lead to the delay in the return of another prominent prisoner, Acadian Noël Doiron.

=== Siege of Port Royal (1707) ===
Baptiste eventually returned to Acadia in 1706 and for the rest of Queen Anne's War served as port captain of the Acadian settlement of Beaubassin. He is reported to have served with distinction in the first Siege of Port Royal (1707).

He sailed along the coast between Port Royal and to the French capital of Newfoundland Plaisance (present day Placentia, Newfoundland and Labrador). In 1709 and 1711 he participated in the arming of privateers at Plaisance.

Because of his immense knowledge of the North Atlantic coasts, the Governor of Plaisance, Philippe Pastour de Costebelle consulted Baptiste on the site for the new settlement on Cape Breton Island, Louisbourg (1714).

== See also ==
- Military history of Nova Scotia
- Francois Guion
