= Siege of Pemaquid (1696) =

Action of King William's War

Coordinates: 43°54′24″N 69°30′54″W

- Part of King William's War
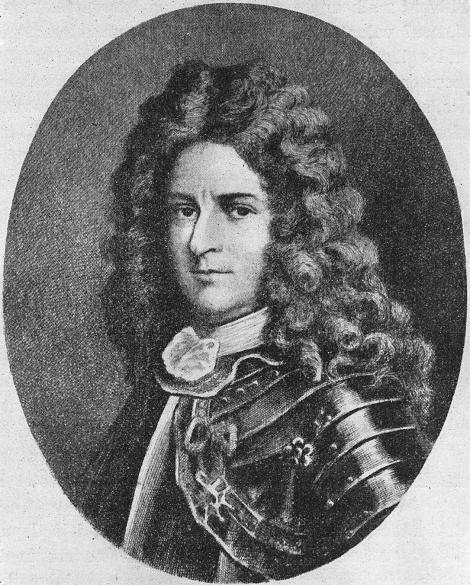
- Pierre Le Moyne d'Iberville
Date	August 14–15, 1696
Location	present-day Bristol, Maine
Result	French and Abenaki victory

Belligerents
New France; Abenaki; Mi'kmaq militia	New England

Commanders and leaders
Pierre Le Moyne d'Iberville; Baron de St Castin; Pierre Maisonnat dit Baptiste; Father Jean Baudoin; Simon-Pierre Denys de Bonaventure; Louis Damours; Simon-Gérard de La Place; Chief Aspinquid	Pasco Chubb

Strength
Some Marines, 100 Canadiens, 400 Abenaki (50 Mi'kmaq)	93 New England troops

Casualties and losses
Unknown	Unknown

The siege of Pemaquid occurred during King William's War when French and Native forces from New France attacked the English settlement at Pemaquid (present-day Bristol, Maine), a community on the border with Acadia. The siege was led by Pierre Le Moyne d'Iberville and Baron de St Castin between August 14–15, 1696. Commander of Fort William Henry, Captain Pasco Chubb, surrendered the fort. Iberville killed three of the soldiers and sent the other 92 back to Boston.

The victory at Pemaquid was one of the most significant the French had during the war. The siege resulted in a retaliatory raid by New England forces on Acadia.

== Historical context ==
During much of the seventeenth century, Pemaquid (present-day Bristol, Maine) was the most northern coastal settlement of New England, and Pentagouet (present-day Castine, Maine) was the most southern Acadian settlement, a colony of New France. During King William's War, the area became a battleground as the French and English fought to determine the boundaries of their empires. In 1689 Baron de St Castin and the Wabanaki Confederacy (Abenaki) captured and burned down Fort Charles, the wooden stockade fort at Pemaquid. They killed 200 British at the fort and surrounding area.

By 1692, the English regained control of the region, and Sir William Phipps ordered construction of Fort William Henry to replace Fort Charles (the original fort built in 1677 by order of Governor Andros). The English built Fort William Henry to protect the northern boundary of New England. The fort was the largest in New England. The Massachusetts government used one third of its budget to build the fort. The fort was built with stone and mortar. There were eighteen cannon mounted in the gun ports of six-foot thick walls that rose ten to twenty feet above the ground. The fort was rebuilt under the direction of Captain John March with the assistance of Benjamin Church.

The commander of the fort was Captain Pasco Chubb. He violated an assembly that was held under a flag of truce, by killing a number of the Abenaki chiefs who were present (including Chief Aspinquid). D'Iberville knew that he would require both a land-based cannon assault and war ships to conquer the fort. Led by Saint-Castin, the Abenaki Nation joined forces with D'Iberville at Pentagouet.

== Siege ==
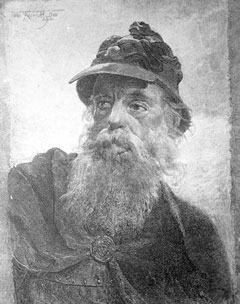
Baron de St Castin

On August 14, D'Iberville led a force of 500 in the siege of Fort William Henry. Five hundred warriors descended onto Fort William Henry in their canoes. The warriors surrounded the fort, thereby pinning the English inside. This strategy allowed D'Iberville to enter the harbor and unload his cannons. D'Iberville arrived with three French ships. They immediately began to lay siege to the fort. Captain Chubb refused to surrender. The assault went on until the afternoon of the next day. In the terms of his surrender, Chubb arranged for his men to be escorted to Boston and exchanged for French and Indian prisoners held there.

== Aftermath ==
D'Iberville and the natives continued on to the English colony of Newfoundland and raided many villages in the Avalon Peninsula Campaign. Major Church retaliated for the siege by going to Acadia and engaging in the Raid on Chignecto. Chubb was tracked down by the natives two years later in his home in Andover and was massacred along with his family.
