= Raid on Chignecto (1696) =

Raid during King William's War on Chignecto, Acadia

Coordinates: 45°55′N 64°10′W

- Part of King William's War
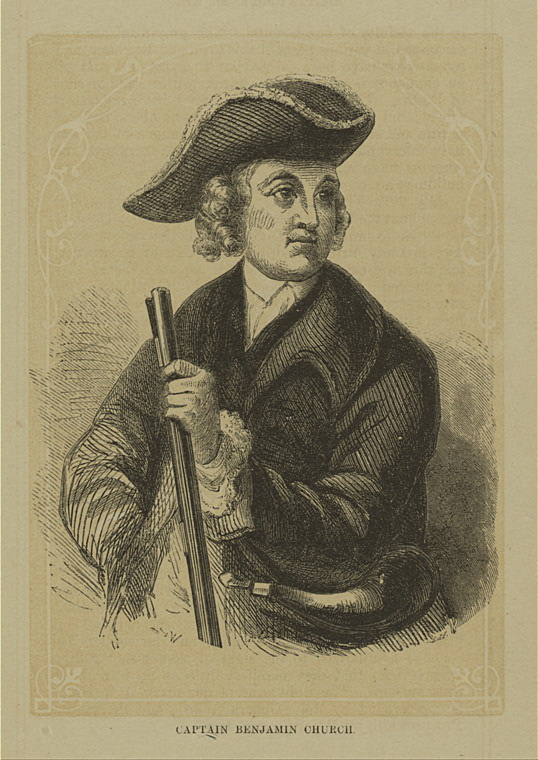
- Colonel Benjamin Church: Father of American ranging
Date	September 20–29, 1696
Location	Chignecto, Acadia
Result	New England victory

Belligerents
Mi'kmaq militia Acadian militia	New England

Commanders and leaders
Father Claude Trouve	Benjamin Church, John Gorham

Strength
Unknown Mi’kmaq and village residents	400 New England troops and native warriors,

Casualties and losses
Unknown	Unknown

The Raid on Chignecto occurred during King William's War when New England forces from Boston attacked the Isthmus of Chignecto, Acadia in present-day Nova Scotia. The raid was in retaliation for the French and Indian Siege of Pemaquid (1696) at present day Bristol, Maine. In the English Province of Massachusetts Bay. Colonel Benjamin Church was the leader of the New England force of 400 men. The raid lasted nine days, between September 20–29, 1696, and formed part of a larger expedition by Church against a number of other Acadian communities.

== Historical context ==
During King William's War – the first of the four French and Indian Wars – French and Natives were victorious in the Siege of Pemaquid (1696) (present day Bristol, Maine) earlier that year. In the Siege of Pemaquid, the French and natives had destroyed Fort William Henry, which the English colonial militia leader Benjamin Church himself assisted in erecting. The Acadians at Chignecto posted a proclamation heralding the success of French arms on their church door. In response to the defeat, the following month Benjamin Church led a devastating raid on the Isthmus of Chignecto at Beaubassin in 1696.

== The raid ==
Church and four hundred men (50 to 150 of whom were Indians, likely Iroquois) arrived offshore of Beaubassin on September 20. When they came ashore, the Acadians and Mi'kmaq opened fire on them. Church lost a lieutenant and several of his men. They managed to get ashore and surprise the Acadians. Many fled while one confronted Church with papers showing they had signed an oath of allegiance in 1690 to the English king. Church was unconvinced, especially after he discovered the proclamation heralding the French success at Pemaquid posted on the church door. He burned a number of buildings, killed inhabitants, looted their household goods, and slaughtered their livestock. Governor Villebon reported that "the English stayed at Beaubassin nine whole days without drawing any supplies from their vessels, and even those settlers to whom they had shown a pretence of mercy were left with empty houses and barns and nothing else except the clothes on their backs."

== Aftermath ==
On September 29, Church and his men proceeded to the mouth of the Saint John River. Church captured two Frenchmen here and learned from them of cannons buried nearby; these he unearthed and then proceeded towards Boston. At Passamaquoddy, Church's force was met by Colonel John Hathorn who took command of the entire force and proceeded to the Saint John River. They moved up the river to lay siege to the capital of Acadia Fort St. Joseph (Nashwaak) (present-day Fredericton, New Brunswick). The siege failed.

Church threatened the Chignecto Acadians before leaving that he would return if more New Englanders suffered. He did return to raid Chignecto again during Queen Anne's War in a campaign against Acadia that also included the Raid on Grand Pre.

== See also ==
- Military history of Nova Scotia
