= Meductic Indian Village / Fort Meductic =

Ancient Wolastoqey settlement

Coordinates: 46.026332°N 67.537323°W

Fort Meductic
- Near the confluence of the Eel River and Saint John River, in New Brunswick,
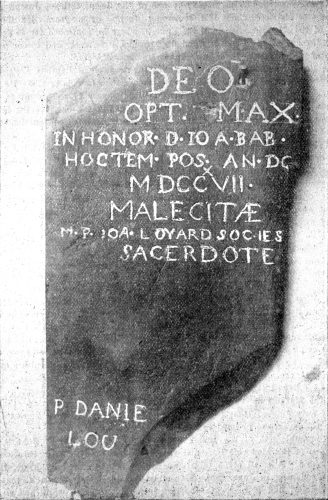
- Meductic Church Cornerstone (1717). Oldest Christian religious artifact in New Brunswick. Discovered 1890.

Site information
- Controlled by: Wolastoqiyik

Site history
- Built: before the 17th century, first fort in Acadia
- Battles/wars: Battle of Fort Loyal

National Historic Site of Canada
- Official name: Meductic Indian Village / Fort Meductic National Historic Site
- Designated: 1924

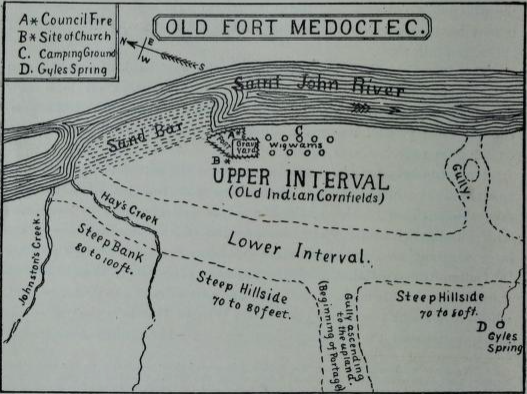
Fort Meductic, Saint John River, New Brunswick

Meductic Indian Village / Fort Meductic, also known as Medoctec or Mehtawtik ("The end of the path"), was a Wolastoqey settlement until the mid-eighteenth century, in New Brunswick, Canada. It was located near the confluence of the Eel River and Saint John River, four miles upriver from present-day Lakeland Ridges. The fortified village of Meductic was the principal settlement of the Wolastoqey First Nation from before the 17th century until the middle of the 18th, and it was an important fur trading centre. (The other two significant native villages in the region were the Abenaki village of Norridgewock (present-day Madison, Maine) on the Kennebec River and Penobscot (present-day Penobscot Indian Island Reservation) on the Penobscot River. Only during King George's War, after the French established Saint Anne (present-day Fredericton, New Brunswick), did the village Aukpaque, present-day Springhill, New Brunswick, become of equal importance to Meductic).

The village contained Fort Meductic, which the Wolastoqiyik had built before the arrival of the French to defend against Mohawk attacks. The Mohawk were one of the Five Nations of the Iroquois Confederacy, based in present-day New York, south of the St. Lawrence River and generally west of the Hudson River. This is reported to have been the first Fort in Acadia.

Father Joseph Aubery re-established the mission in 1701. During the lead up to Father Rale's War, to secure the French influence on the village, Priest Jean-Baptiste Loyard built the chapel Saint Jean Baptiste (1717). (The bell was given by King Louis XV.) Similarly, the French claimed territory on the Kennebec River by building a church in the Abenaki village of Norridgewock.

The Meductic village and fort location is a National Historic Site. A federal plaque from the Historic Sites and Monuments Board was placed on a cairn on Fort Meductic Road, near the site. [As of April 2020, the plaque was missing from the cairn.] Official recognition refers to the polygon around the archaeological remains.

Related to the site, the Meductic-Eel River Portage was designated a National Historic Event in 1943. It was part of the route between Acadia and New England, and used by France on expeditions against the English.

== See also ==
- Military history of the Maliseet people
