= Benjamin Church (ranger) =

Military officer and politician (1639–1718)

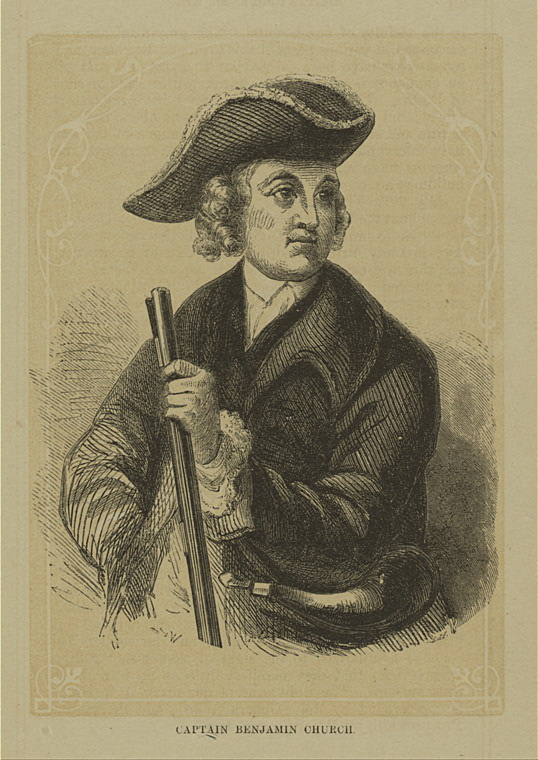
- A posthumous illustration of Church; the tricorne is inaccurate.
- Born: c. 1639; Plymouth, Plymouth Colony
- Died: 17 January 1718 (aged 78–79); Little Compton, Colony of Rhode Island
- Military career
- Allegiance: New England Colonies
- Branch: New England Militia
- Rank: Colonel
- Conflicts: King Philip's War; Great Swamp Fight; King William's War; Battle of Falmouth; Androscoggin River expedition; Raid on Bagaduce; Raid on Chignecto; Siege of Fort Nashwaak; Queen Anne's War; Raid on St. Stephen; Raid on Grand Pré; Raid on Chignecto

Colonel Benjamin Church (c. 1639 – January 17, 1718) was a military officer and politician from the New England Colonies who is best known for his role in innovative military tactics notably developing unconventional warfare. He is also known for commanding the first ranger units in North America. Born in the Plymouth Colony, Church was commissioned by Governor Josiah Winslow to establish a company of Rangers called after the outbreak of King Philip's War. Church participated in numerous conflicts which involved the New England Colonies. The force of New Englanders he led tracked down and killed Wampanoag sachem Metacomet, a major factor in ending the conflict.

During the French and Indian Wars, Church participated in asymmetric warfare against the French and their indigenous allies. He led troops to raid the French colony of Acadia during King William's War and Queen Anne's War. Starting his military career at the rank of captain, he was promoted to major and subsequently to the rank of colonel.

Church paid special care to outfitting, supplying and instructing his troops in ways inspired by indigenous methods of warfare and ways of living. He emphasized the adoption of indigenous techniques, which prioritized small, mobile and flexible units which used the countryside for cover, in lieu of massed frontal assaults by large formations. Church also pioneered the use of indigenous warriors as auxiliaries to bolster and educate his soldiers. In 1716, his memoirs, entitled Entertaining Passages relating to Philip's War, was published and is considered by some to constitute the first American military manual.

== Early life ==
Benjamin Church was born in the Plymouth Colony c. 1639, the son of Richard Church and Elizabeth Warren. The maternal grandson of Richard Warren, one of the passengers on the Mayflower, he was brought up according to colonial practices on the American frontier. Church married Alice Southworth on December 26, 1667 in Duxbury, Massachusetts. He resided for a period of time in Duxbury before moving to Bristol, Rhode Island. Church later moved to Little Compton, Rhode Island, where he and his wife were eventually buried. Her gravesite is marked by a historically significant gravestone known as a table grave.

== King Philip's War ==
During King Philip's War, Church was the principal military aide to Governor Josiah Winslow of Plymouth Colony. Commissioned by Winslow as a captain on July 24, 1675, he fought during King Philip's War (1675–1678) on the New England frontier against the Wampanoag, Nipmuck and Podunk tribes of Indians. He is best known during this time for commanding a company of Englishmen and Native Americans independently of the governor's direction. Church's men were the first colonial force to be successful in raiding the hostile Indians' camps in forests and swamps. During previous decades, colonists had been on the defense against the Natives, who knew their territory intimately. Relations were generally peaceful until 1675, but tensions had been growing as the colonists and their views of property encroached on Indian territory and hunting grounds.

Church was allowed to recruit Native Americans after he and other leaders realized that traditional European military tactics were ineffective in frontier warfare. He also persuaded many neutral or formerly hostile Indians to surrender and join his unit, where they operated skillfully as irregular troops. Some of these men had converted to Christianity in settlements before the war. They were known as Praying Indians. After being organized by Church, these troops tracked hostile Indians into the forests and swamps, and conducted effective raids and ambushes on their camps. In the summer of 1675, Church spoke out against the colonial practice of enslaving Indians, describing the practice as "an action so hateful... that [I] opposed it to the loss of the goodwill and respect of some that before were good friends." However, Church was not opposed to the enslavement of Black people, owning Black slaves like many of his fellow colonists.

=== Great Swamp Fight ===
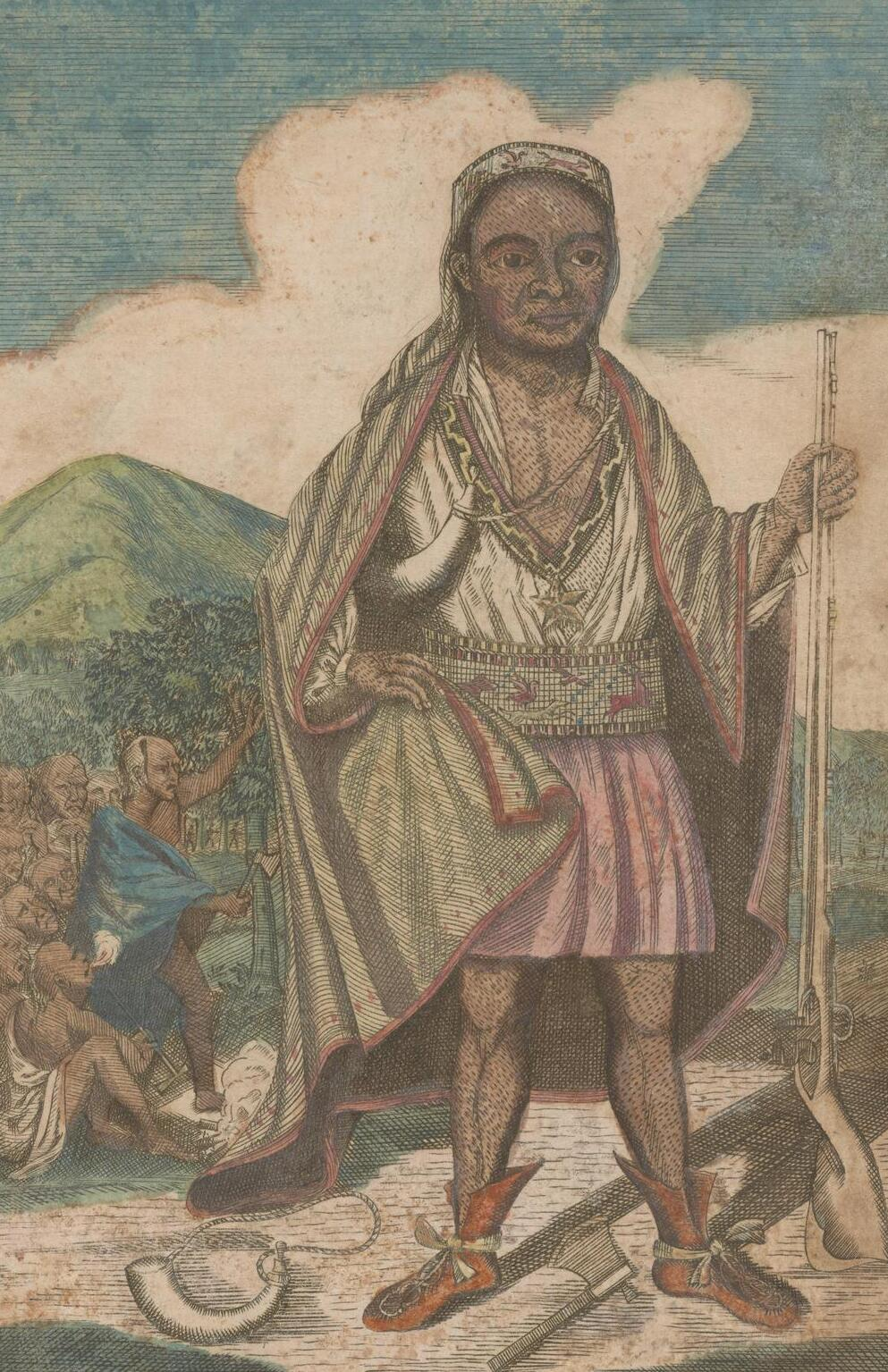
1772 portrait of Metacomet

During the Great Swamp Fight on December 19, 1675, Church was wounded while serving as an aide to Governor Winslow, the commander of the colonial forces in the battle. Forces of the colonies of Massachusetts, Plymouth and Connecticut killed an estimated 300 Narragansett warriors and an unknown number of women and children of the Narragansett Tribe. The surviving Narragansetts fled and remained in hiding for the remainder of the war. After the Great Swamp Fight, Church and the colonial army were 15 miles from their base in North Kingstown and had to endure a long march encumbered by dragging their dead and wounded and severe cold.

The war ended eight months later following an operation by Church's company on August 12, 1676. John Alderman, one of Church's Indian allies, killed King Philip (also known as Metacomet), leader of the Wampanoag tribe. Upon inspection of Philip's body, Church is quoted as saying "a doleful, great, naked, dirty beast." Metacomet's body, was in accordance with the standard punishment for treason, hung, drawn and quartered.

== King William's War ==
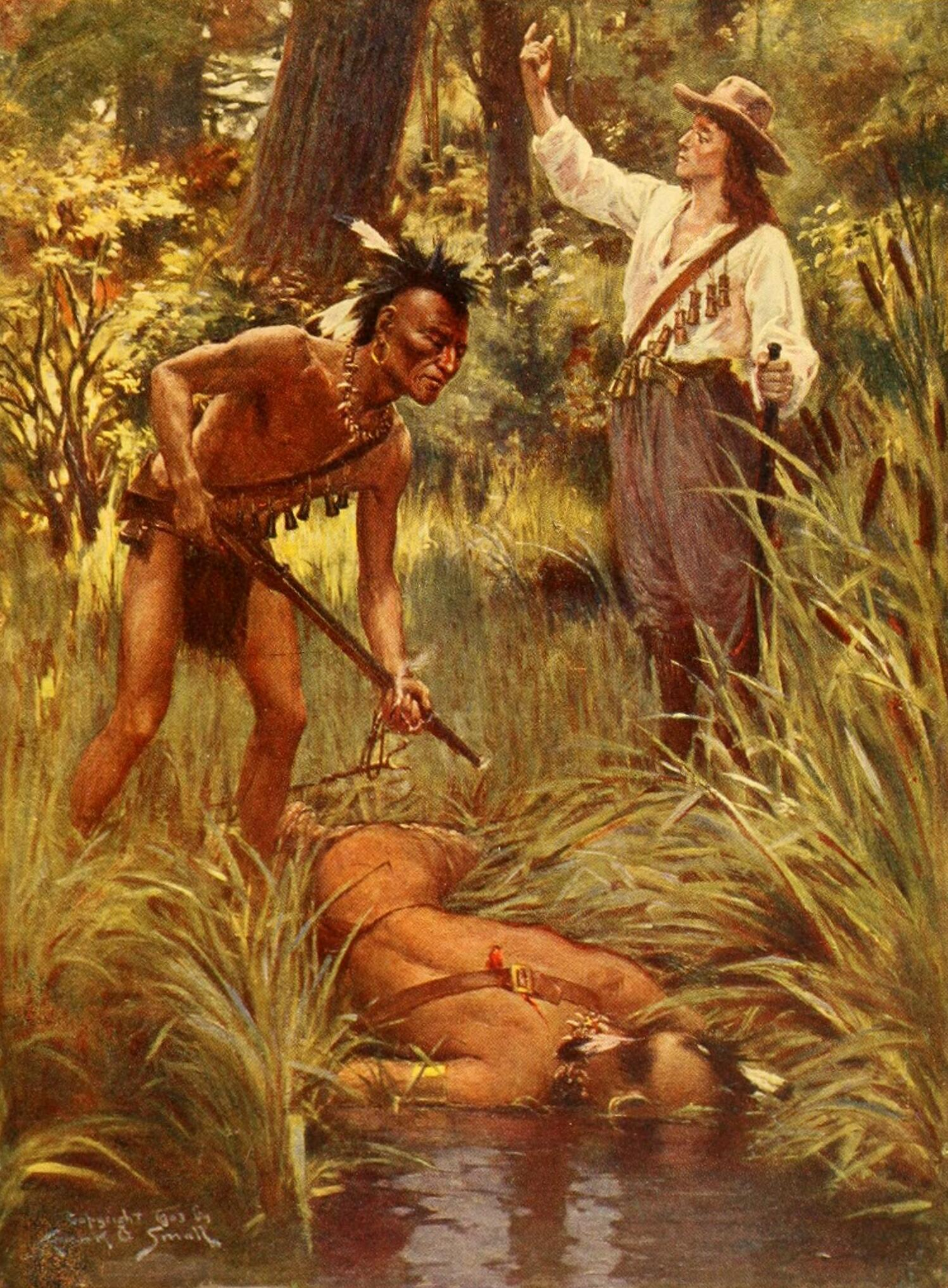
John Alderman and Church next to Metacomet's corpse

During King William's War (1688–1697), Church led four New England raiding parties into Acadia (which included most of Maine) against the ethnic French Acadians and hostile Native Americans, including the Abenaki. On the first expedition into Acadia, on September 21, 1689, Major Church (who was promoted to major and given command of the expedition by the Council of War of Plymouth Colony on September 6) and 250 troops defended a group of English settlers in the Deering Oaks at the Battle of Brackett's Wood. The British were trying to get established at Falmouth, Maine (present-day Portland, Maine). Although 21 of his men were killed, Church was successful and the hostile natives retreated.

Church returned to Boston, leaving the small group of English settlers unprotected. (The following spring, May 1690, over 400 French and native troops under the leadership of Castin returned to Falmouth and massacred all the settlers in the Battle of Fort Loyal. When Church returned to the village later that summer, he buried the dead.)

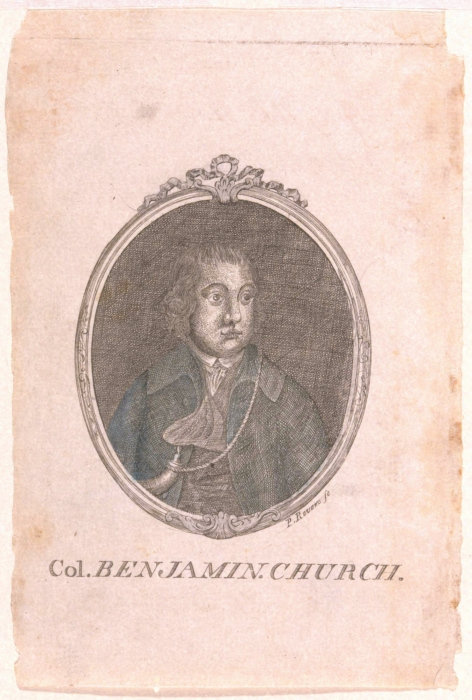
Engraved portrait by Paul Revere that was believed to be of Church. Yale University Art Gallery. The portrait has been identified as English poet Charles Churchill.

In Church's second expedition a year later, on September 11, 1690, he commanded 300 men at Casco Bay. His mission was to recapture Fort Pejpescot (present day Brunswick, Maine), which had been taken by natives. He went up the Androscoggin River to Fort Pejepscot. From there he traveled 40 miles up river to Livermore Falls, Maine, where he attacked an Androscoggin native village. Church's men shot three or four native men as they were retreating. Church discovered five English captives in the wigwams and proceeded to killed six or seven prisoners, and took nine prisoners. A few days later, in retaliation, the Androscoggin attacked Church at Cape Elizabeth on Purpooduc Point, killing seven of his men and wounding 24 others. On September 26, Church returned to Portsmouth, New Hampshire.

Church's third expedition during the war was in 1692, when he raided the Penobscot territory of (present-day Indian Island, Maine) with 450 men. Church and his men went on to raid Taconock (superseded by Winslow, Maine). Four years later, Major Church conducted a fourth expedition. He carried out the Siege of Fort Nashwaak (1696) (present-day Fredericton, New Brunswick), which was then the capital of Acadia, and the Raid on Chignecto (1696) in Acadia. He was described as weighing approximately 250 pounds, but personally led his troops. They killed the inhabitants of Chignecto, looting their household goods, burning their houses, and slaughtering the livestock.

== Queen Anne's War ==
During Queen Anne's War, Church went on his fifth and final expedition into Acadia. The Deerfield Massacre had taken place in western Massachusetts on February 29, 1704, believed conducted by Indians provoked by the French. In addition to killing many settlers, the Abenaki and allies took more than 100 captives overland to Montreal and the Mohawk village south of the river. The captives were often held for ransom by families and communities; some of the younger ones were adopted by Mohawk families.

On March 18, 1704 Church was commissioned as a colonel by Massachusetts Governor Joseph Dudley and placed in command of a force to raid French settlements in Acadia in retaliation for Deerfield. This expedition included the following actions: the Raid on Castine, Maine, Raid on St. Stephen, New Brunswick, Raid on Grand Pre, Raid on Pisiguit (present day Falmouth and Windsor), and the Raid on Chignecto.

Church meticulously planned the expedition. He specified the design of whaleboats to be used in the raids and what kind of hatchets his soldiers were to carry. Church took John Gyles, formerly held as a captive by the Maliseet, as his translator. Church took prisoners and claimed to have left only five houses standing in Acadia. In the Raid of Pisiguit (1704), he took the leader Noel Doiron as prisoner.

== Tactics and war doctrine ==
While Church left no formal writings on military doctrine, his memoirs provided considerable detail about his practices. Through the study of his military experiences, scholars have summarized his practices according to the following principles:

1. Planning each operation in advance, not leaving anything to chance.
2. Ensuring that soldiers under his command were properly trained, fed, and equipped.
3. Building alliances with potential allies (i.e. Native Americans), who may have been overlooked or mistrusted by other commanders.
4. Using stealth and surprise to tactical advantage.
5. Understanding how a tactical operation fits in with strategic objectives.
6. Leading by example and from the front.
7. Maintaining communications with higher and lower echelons.

== Later life ==
Church was elected to public office as the first representative of Bristol to the Plymouth Colony legislature, serving between 1682 and 1684.

Church died at Little Compton in 1718 and was buried in the Little Compton Common cemetery.

== Legacy ==
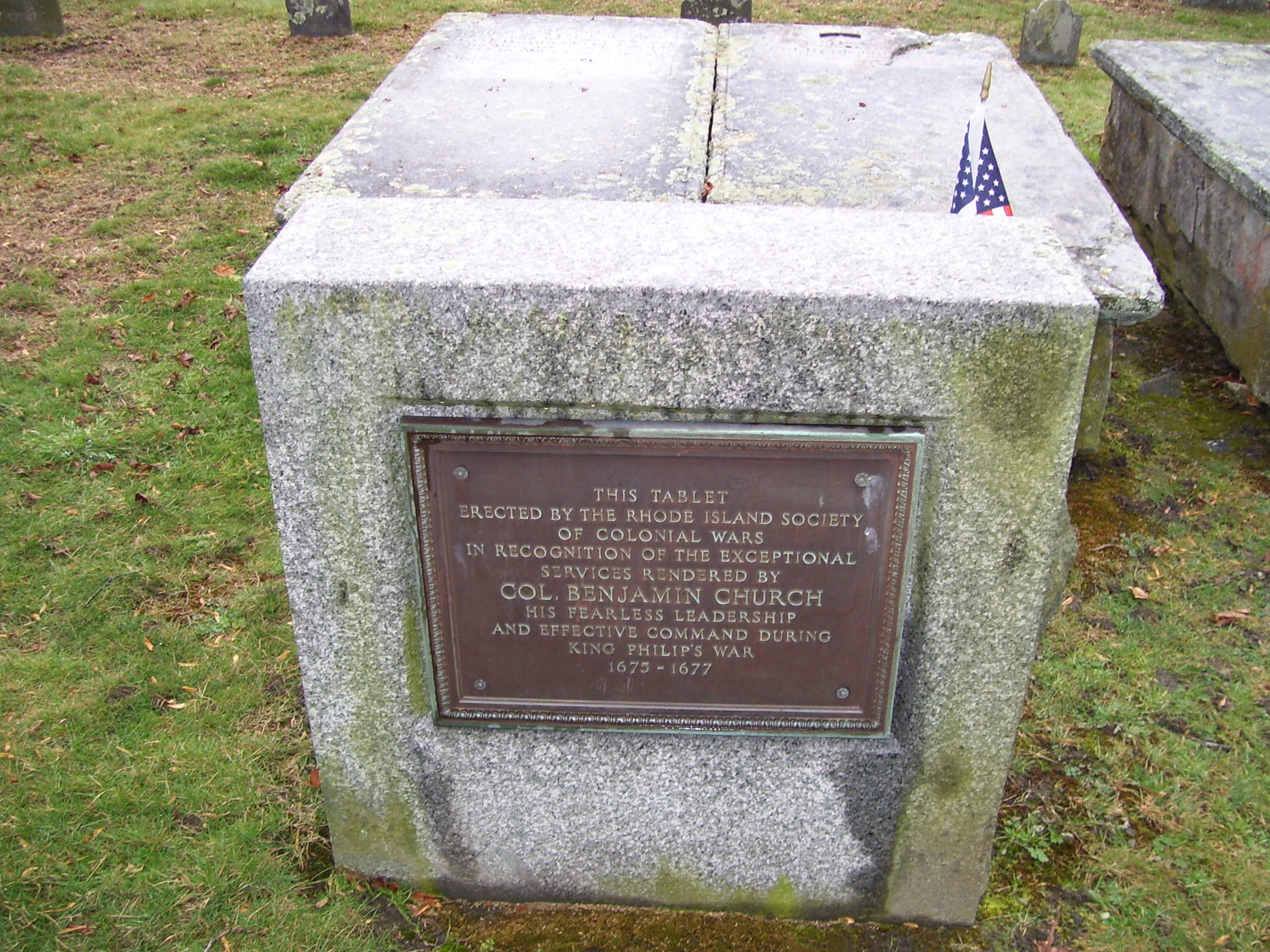
Church's grave in Little Compton Common

Church kept notes on his tactics and operations in 1675-1676. His work was eventually published in 1716 as Entertaining Passages relating to Philip's War. Church was the great-grandfather of Dr. Benjamin Church, the first "Surgeon General" (though that title came later) of the Continental Army. Dr. Church, thought to have been a staunch Whig, was later arrested by General George Washington as a suspected spy for British General Thomas Gage.

Rogers Rangers and Gorham's Rangers were militia developed according to the tradition begun by Church.

In 1992, in honor of his innovative tactical methods, Church was inducted into the U.S. Army Ranger Hall of Fame. A bronze Ranger Tab was affixed to his gravestone to mark this.

The main character in the movie The Patriot (2000) is loosely based on Church (as well as other historical figures) and references the guerrilla tactics Church used in previous engagements. The movie features Mel Gibson starring as Benjamin Martin. Benjamin Church died 57 years before the American Revolutionary War started in 1775.

The Rhode Island Society of Colonial Wars placed a plaque near Colonel Church's grave in honor of his leadership and bravery during King Philip's War.

== See also ==
- Military history of Nova Scotia

== Primary sources ==
- Wakefield, Robert (2011). Mayflower Families Through Five Generations, Volume Eighteen, Part 2, Second Edition. Plymouth, MA: General Society of Mayflower Descendants. pp. 266–267. ISBN 978-0-930270-20-9.
- Church, Benjamin, as told to Thomas Church, The History of Philip's War, Commonly Called The Great Indian War of 1675 and 1676, edited by Samuel G. Drake,(Exeter, NH: J & B Williams, 1829); Facsimile Reprint by Heritage Books, Bowie, Maryland, 1989.
- The history of King Philip's War; also of expeditions against the French and Indians in its Eastern parts of New England, in the years 1689, 1692, i696 AND 1704. With some account of the divine providence towards Col. Benjamin Church. By Benjamin Church, Thomas Church, Samuel Gardner Drake
- Church, Thomas. The History of the Great Indian War

== Secondary sources ==
- Beattie, Daniel J. (1986). “The Adaptation of the British Army to Wilderness Warfare, 1755-1763”, Adapting to Conditions: War and Society in the Eighteenth Century, ed. Maarten Ultee (University of Alabama Press), 56-83.
- Chet, Guy. “The Literary and Military Career of Benjamin Church: Change or Continuity in Early American Warfare,” Historical Journal of Massachusetts 35:2 (Summer 2007): 105-112
- Chet, Guy (2003). Conquering the American Wilderness: The Triumph of European Warfare in the Colonial Northeast. University of Massachusetts Press.
- Drake, Samuel. The Border Wars of New England, commonly called King William's and Queen Anne's Wars. 1910. Drake's book
- Faragher, John Mack, A Great and Noble Scheme New York; W. W. Norton & Company, 2005. ISBN 0-393-05135-8
- Philip Gould. (1996). Reinventing Benjamin Church: Virtue, Citizenship and the History of King Philip's War in Early National America. Journal of the Early Republic, Vol. 16, No. 4 (Winter, 1996), pp. 645–657
- Grenier, John. The First Way of War: American War Making on the Frontier. (Cambridge: Cambridge University Press. 2005).
- Pargellis, Stanley McCrory. “Braddock’s Defeat”, American Historical Review 41 (1936): 253-269.
- Pargellis, Stanley McCrory (1933). Lord Loudoun in North America. Yale University Press.
- Philbrick, Nathaniel, Mayflower: A Story of Courage, Community, and War. New York: Viking Penguin, 2006. ISBN 0-670-03760-5
- Zelner, Kyle F. A Rabble in Arms: Massachusetts Towns and Militiamen during King Philip's War (New York: New York University Press, 2009) ISBN 978-0814797341
