= Peace by Chocolate =

Syrian-Canadian owned chocolaterie

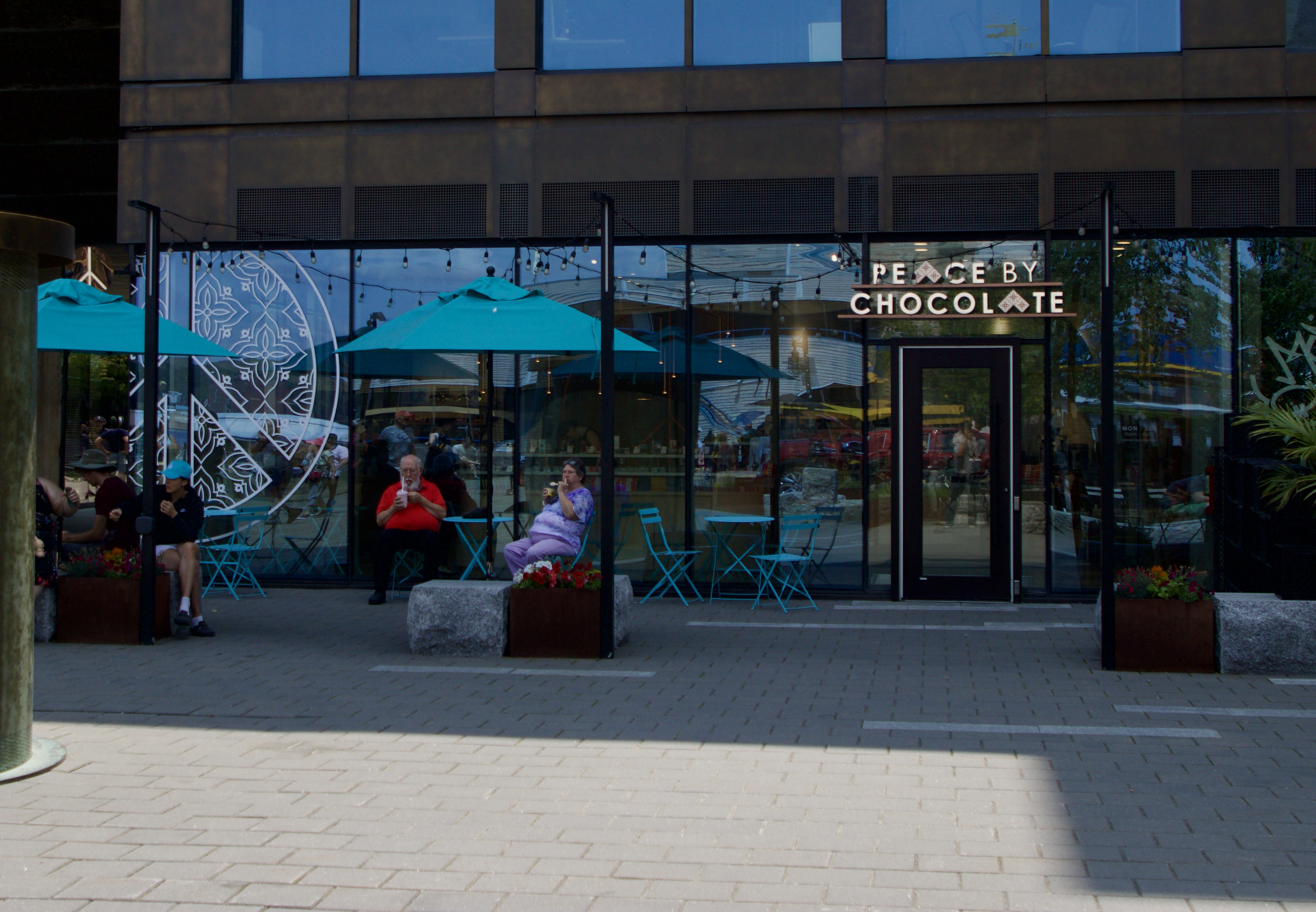
- Industry: Confectionery production
- Founded: 2016
- Founder: Tareq Hadhad
- Headquarters: Antigonish, Nova Scotia, Canada
- Area served: Worldwide
- Products: Food (Chocolate)
- Website: peacebychocolate.ca

Peace by Chocolate is a chocolate company based in Antigonish, Nova Scotia, Canada. The company was founded in 2016 by the Hadhad family, after moving to Canada as Syrian refugees.

== History ==
After the Syrian civil war, Tareq Hadhad received a sponsorship from Antigonish, Nova Scotia, in 2015 which led to the rest of the family following in 2016. Upon arriving in Canada, Tareq's father Issam Hadhad, who had previously opened a factory and two shops in Damascus, began making chocolate out of his kitchen. The family wanted to increase production and reached out for financial assistance. After explaining that "borrowing money from a bank is not part of our culture" they received an interest-free loan from the community. They raised over $25,000 in a GoFundMe campaign. Peace By Chocolate has also received over $400,000 in assistance from government sources, such as Atlantic Canada Opportunities Agency.

In 2018, Peace by Chocolate started the organization Peace on Earth Society, which receives 3-5% of all company returns. The company considers the society to be an "early step towards one day creating a registered not-for-profit." By September 2023, the company had put $552,000 into the Peace on Earth Society. On March 5, 2021, the company opened a storefront along the Halifax Waterfront.

== Recognition ==
Peace by Chocolate's story has been cited by the Liberal Party of Canada. Specifically, in Cabinet Minister Sean Fraser's campaign and one of Prime Minister Justin Trudeau's speeches at the United Nations.

Tareq Hadhad was appointed to Invest Nova Scotia's board of directors in September 2017. In September 2020, he won a National Entrepreneurship Award for his positive impact as a new Canadian, and was one of the recipients of the Top 25 Canadian Immigrant Awards of 2020.

In March 2023, during United States President Joe Biden’s trip to Ottawa, Green Party leader Elizabeth May gave him a chocolate bar from Peace by Chocolate as a gift.

== In popular culture ==
Jon Tattrie wrote a book about the Hadhad company in 2020. A film adaptation of the family's story, also called Peace by Chocolate, premiered at the Tribeca Film Festival in 2021.

In 2022, Tareq Hadhad was named as a panelist on Canada Reads, advocating for Omar El Akkad's novel What Strange Paradise.
