= Tattrie =

Tattrie is a surname. Notable people with the surname include:

- Jon Tattrie (fl. 1999), Canadian writer and journalist
- Newton Tattrie (1931–2013), known professionally as Geeto Mongol, Canadian professional wrestler
