= Military history of the Mi'kmaq =

Militias of Mi'kmaq

The military history of the Mi'kmaq consisted primarily of Mi'kmaq warriors (smáknisk) who participated in wars against the English (the British after 1707) independently as well as in coordination with the Acadian militia and French royal forces. (Note: Many of the Acadians and Miꞌkmaq people were Métis. For information on Métis Acadians see:) The Mi'kmaq militias remained an effective force for over 75 years before the Halifax Treaties were signed (1760–1761). In the nineteenth century, the Mi'kmaq "boasted" that, in their contest with the British, the Mi'kmaq "killed more men than they lost". In 1753, Charles Morris stated that the Mi'kmaq have the advantage of "no settlement or place of abode, but wandering from place to place in unknown and, therefore, inaccessible woods, is so great that it has hitherto rendered all attempts to surprise them ineffectual". Leadership on both sides of the conflict employed standard colonial warfare, which included scalping non-combatants (e.g., families). After some engagements against the British during the American Revolutionary War, the militias were dormant throughout the nineteenth century, while the Mi'kmaq people used diplomatic efforts to have the local authorities honour the treaties. After confederation, Mi'kmaq warriors eventually joined Canada's war efforts in World War I and World War II. The most well-known colonial leaders of these militias were Chief (Sakamaw) Jean-Baptiste Cope and Chief Étienne Bâtard.

== 16th century ==
=== Battle at Bae de Bic ===
According to Jacques Cartier, the Battle at Bae de Bic happened in the spring of 1534, 100 Iroquois warriors massacred a group of 200 Mi'kmaq camped on Massacre Island in the St. Lawrence River. Bae de Bic was an annual gathering place for the Mi'kmaq along the St. Lawrence. Mi'kmaq scouting parties notified the village of the Iroquois attack the evening before the morning attack. They evacuated 30 of the infirm and elderly and about 200 Mi'kmaq left their encampment on the shore and retreated to an island in the bay. They took cover in a cave on the island and covered the entrance with branches. The Iroquois arrived at the village in the morning. Finding it vacated, they divided into search parties but failed to find the Mi'kmaq until the morning of the next day.

The Mi'kmaq warriors defended the tribe against the first Iroquois assault. Initially, after many had been wounded on both sides, with the rising tide, the Mi'kmaq were able to repulse the assault and the Iroquois retreated to the mainland. The Mi'kmaq prepared a fortification on the island in preparation for the next assault at low tide. The Iroquois were again repulsed and retreated to the mainland with the rising tide. By the following morning, the tide was again low and the Iroquois made their final approach. They had prepared arrows that carried fire which burned down the fortification and wiped out the Mi'kmaq. Twenty Iroquois were killed and thirty wounded in the battle. The Iroquois divided into two companies to return to their canoes on the Bouabouscache River.

=== Battle at Bouabouscache River ===
Just prior to Battle at Bae de Bic, the Iroquois warriors had left their canoes and hid their provisions on the Bouabousche River, which the Mi'kmaq scouts had discovered and recruited assistance from 25 Maliseet warriors. The Mi'kmaq and Maliseet militia ambushed the first company of Iroquois to arrive at the site. They killed ten and wounded five of the Iroquois warriors before the second company of Iroquois arrived and the Mi'kmaq/Maliseet militia retreated to the woods unharmed.

The Mi'kmaq/Maliseet militia had stolen most of the Iroquois canoes. Leaving twenty wounded behind at the site, 50 Iroquois went to find their hidden provisions. Unable to find their supplies, at the end of the day they returned to the camp, finding that the 20 wounded soldiers that had stayed behind had been slaughtered by the Mi'kmaq/Maliseet militia. The following morning, the 38 Iroquois warriors left their camp, killing twelve of their own wounded who would not be able to survive the long journey back to their village. Ten of the Mi'kmaq/Maliseet stayed with the stolen canoes and provisions while the remaining 15 pursued the Iroquois. The Mi'kmaq/Maliseet militia pursued the Iroquois for three days, killing eleven of the wounded Iroquois stragglers.

=== Battle at Riviere Trois Pistoles ===
Shortly after the Battle at Bouabouscache River, the retreating Iroquois set up camp on the Riviere Trois Pistoles to build canoes to return to their village. An Iroquois hunting party was sent to hunt for food. The Mi'kmaq/Maliseet militia killed the hunting party. The Iroquois went to find their missing hunting party and were ambushed by the Mi'kmaq/Maliseet militia. They killed nine of the Iroquois, leaving 29 warriors who retreated to their camp on Riviere Trois Pistoles. The Mi'kmaq/Maliseet militia divided into two companies and attacked the remaining Iroquois warriors. The battle left 3 Maliseet warriors dead and many others wounded. The Mi'kmaq/Maliseet militia was victorious, however, killing all but six of the Iroquois, whom they took prisoner and later tortured and killed.

=== Kwedech–Mi'kmaq War ===
Tradition indicates that there was war in the 16th century between the Kwedech (the St. Lawrence Iroquois) and the Mi'kmaq. The great Mi'kmaq chief Ulgimoo led his people. The conflict was eventually settled through a peace treaty after the Mi'kmaq were successful in removing the Kwedech out of the Maritimes.

== 17th century ==
A subgroup of Mi'kmaq who lived in New England were known as Tarrantines. The Tarrantines sent 300 warriors to kill Nanepashemet and his wife in 1619 at Mystic Fort. The remaining family had been sent off to safe haven. Nanapashemet's death ended the Massachusetts Federation.

=== Tarrantine War ===
Before 1620, the Penobscot-Tarrantine War (1614–1615) (Tarrantine being the New England term for Mi'kmaq) happened in current day Maine, in which the Pawtucket Tribe supported the former. This led later to retaliatory raids by the Tarrantines on the Pawtucket and Agawam (Ipswich) Tribes.

In 1633, Tarrantines raided the camp of Chief Masconomet at Agawam in Essex County.

=== King Philip's War ===
The first documented warfare between the Mi'kmaq and the British was during the First Abenaki War (the Maine/Acadia theatre of King Philip's War), which was the Battle of Port La Tour (1677). In the wake of King Philip's War, the Mi'kmaq became members of the Wapnáki (Wabanaki Confederacy), an alliance with four other Algonquian-language nations: the Abenaki, Penobscot, Passamaquoddy, and Maliseet. (Note: The allied tribes occupied the territory which the French named Acadia. The tribes ranged from present-day northern and eastern New England in the United States to the Maritime Provinces of Canada. At the time of contact with the French (late 16th century), they were expanding from their maritime base westward along the Gaspé Peninsula/St. Lawrence River at the expense of Iroquoian-speaking tribes. The Míkmaq name for this peninsula was Kespek (meaning "last-acquired").)

The Wabanaki Confederacy allied with French colonists in Acadia. Over a period of seventy-five years, during six wars in Mi'kma'ki (Acadia and Nova Scotia), the Mi'kmaq fought to keep the British from taking over the region. The first war where there is evidence of widespread participation of the Mi'kmaq militias was King William's War.

=== King William's War ===
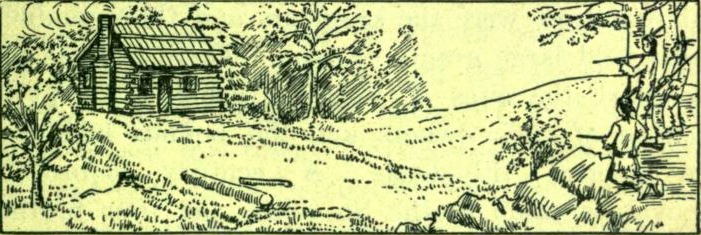
Maliseet and Mi'kmaq "attack on the [Maine] settlement" (c. 1690)

During King William's War, the Mi'kmaq militia participated in defending against the British migration toward Mi'kmaki. They fought, with the support of their Wabanaki and French allies, the British along the Kennebec River in southern Maine which was the natural boundary between Acadia and New England. Toward this end, the Mi'kmaq militia and the Maliseet operated from their headquarters at Meductic on the Saint John River. They joined the New France expedition against present-day Bristol, Maine (the siege of Pemaquid), Salmon Falls and present-day Portland, Maine. Mi'kmaq tortured the British prisoners taken during these conflicts and the Battle of Fort Loyal. In response, the New Englanders retaliated by attacking Port Royal and present-day Guysborough. In 1692, Mi'kmaq from across the region participated in the Raid on Wells. In 1694, the Maliseet participated in the Raid on Oyster River at present-day Durham, New Hampshire.

Two years later, New France, led by Pierre Le Moyne d'Iberville, returned and fought a naval battle in the Bay of Fundy before moving on to raid Bristol, Maine again. In the lead up to this battle in Fundy Bay, on 5 July, 140 natives (Mi'kmaq and Maliseet), with Jacques Testard de Montigny and Chevalier, from their location of Manawoganish island, ambushed the crews of four English vessels. Some of the English were coming ashore in a long boat to get firewood. A native killed five of the nine men in the boat. The Mi'kmaq burned the vessel under the direction of Father Florentine (missionary to the Micmacs at Chignectou).

In retaliation for the siege of Pemaquid that followed, the New Englanders, led by Benjamin Church, engaged in a Raid on Chignecto and the siege of the capital of Acadia at Fort Nashwaak. After the siege of Pemaquid, d'Iberville led a force of 124 Canadians, Acadians, Mi'kmaq, and Abenaki in the Avalon Peninsula Campaign. They destroyed almost every English settlement in Newfoundland, over 100 English were killed, many times that number captured, and almost 500 deported to England or France.

== 18th century ==
=== Queen Anne's War ===
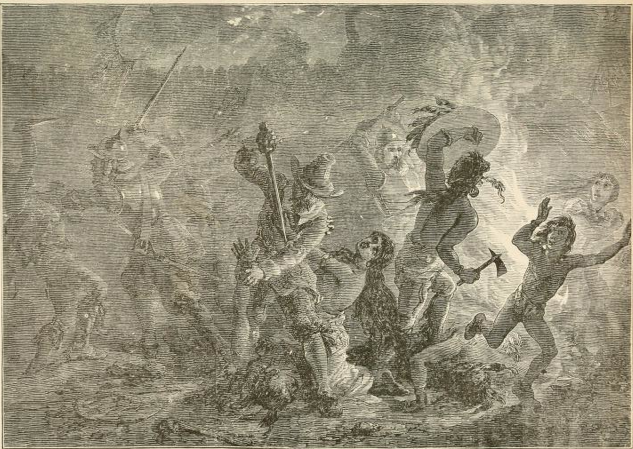
Raid on Grand Pré (1704)

During Queen Anne's War, the Mi'kmaq militias participated again in defending Mi'kmaki against the migration of the British into the region. Again, they made numerous raids along the Acadia/ New England border. They made numerous raids on New England settlements along the border in the Northeast Coast Campaign. In retaliation for the Mi'kmaq militia raids (and the Raid on Deerfield), Major Benjamin Church went on his fifth and final expedition to Acadia. He raided present-day Castine, Maine and then continued on by conducting raids against Grand Pre, Pisiquid and Chignecto. In the summer of 1705, Mi'kmaq killed a fisherman gathering "wood off Cape Sables." A few years later, defeated in the siege of Pemaquid, Captain March made an unsuccessful siege on the Capital of Acadia, Port Royal (1707). The New Englanders were successful with the siege of Port Royal, while the Wabanaki Confederacy were successful in the nearby Battle of Bloody Creek in 1711.

During Queen Anne's War, the Conquest of Acadia (1710) was confirmed by the Treaty of Utrecht of 1713. Acadia was defined as mainland-Nova Scotia by the French. Present-day New Brunswick and most of Maine remained contested territory, while New England conceded Île St Jean and Île Royale; present-day Prince Edward Island and Cape Breton respectively, as French territory. On the latter island, the French established a fortress at Louisbourg to guard the sea approaches to Quebec. In 1712, the Mi'kmaq captured over twenty New England fishing vessels off the coast of Nova Scotia.

In 1715, the Mi'kmaq were told that the British now claimed their ancient territory by the Treaty of Utrecht, in which the Mi'kmaq were not involved. They formally complained to the French commander at Louisbourg about the French king transferring the sovereignty of their nation when he did not possess it. They were only then informed that the French had claimed legal possession of their country for a century, on account of laws decreed by kings in Europe.

Native people saw no reason to accept British pretensions to rule Nova Scotia. There was an attempt by the British after the war to settle outside of Mi'kmaq accommodation of the British trading posts at Canso and Annapolis. On 14 May 1715, New England naval commander Cyprian Southack attempted to create a permanent fishing station at a place he named "Cape Roseway" (now known as Shelburne). Shortly after he established himself, in July 1715, the Mi'kmaq raided the station and burned it to the ground. In July 1715, two of the Boston merchants who had had their fishing vessels seized off Cape Sable by the Mi'kmaq under renegade Joseph Mius reported that "the Indians say the Lands are theirs and they can make Warr and peace when they please...." In response, Southack led a raid on Canso, Nova Scotia (1718) and encouraged Governor Phillips to fortify Canso.

=== Father Rale's War ===
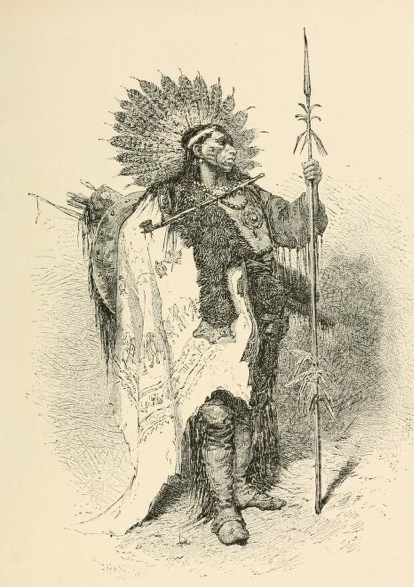
A Mi'kmaq chief

During the escalation that preceded Father Rale's War (1722–1725), some Mi'kmaq raided Fort William Augustus at Canso, Nova Scotia (1720). Under potential siege, in May 1722, Lieutenant Governor John Doucett took 22 Miꞌkmaq hostage at Annapolis Royal to prevent the capital from being attacked. In July 1722, the Abenaki and Mi'kmaq created a blockade of Annapolis Royal, with the intent of starving the capital. The natives captured 18 fishing vessels and prisoners from present-day Yarmouth to Canso. They also seized prisoners and vessels from the Bay of Fundy.

As a result of the escalating conflict, Massachusetts Governor Samuel Shute officially declared war on 22 July 1722. The first battle of Father Rale's War happened in the Nova Scotia theatre. (Note: The Nova Scotia theatre of the Dummer War is named the "Miꞌkmaq–Maliseet War" by John Grenier.) In response to the blockade of Annapolis Royal, at the end of July 1722, New England launched a campaign to end the blockade and retrieve over 86 New England prisoners taken by the natives. One of these operations resulted in the Battle at Jeddore.

==== Raid on Georgetown ====
On 10 September 1722, in conjunction with Father Rale at Norridgewock, 400 or 500 St. Francis (Odanak, Quebec) and Miꞌkmaq fell upon Georgetown (present-day Arrowsic, Maine). Captain Penhallow discharged musketry from a small guard, wounding three of the Indians and killing another. This defense gave the inhabitants of the village time to retreat into the fort. In full possession of the undefended village, the Indians killed fifty head of cattle and set fire to twenty-six houses outside the fort. The Indians then assaulted the fort, killing one New Englander. Georgetown was burned.

That night Colonel Walton and Captain Harman arrived with thirty men, to which were joined about forty men from the fort under Captains Penhallow and Temple. The combined force of seventy men attacked the natives but were overwhelmed by their numbers. The New Englanders then retreated back into the fort. Viewing further attacks on the fort as useless, the Indians eventually retired up the river.

During their return to Norridgewock the natives attacked Fort Richmond. Fort Richmond was attacked in a three-hour siege. Houses were burned and cattle slain, but the fort held. Brunswick and other settlements near the mouth of the Kennebec were burned.

The next was a raid on Canso in 1723.

During the 1724 Northeast Coast campaign, assisted by the Mi'kmaq from Cape Sable Island, the natives also engaged in a naval campaign. In just a few weeks, they had captured 22 vessels, killing 22 New Englanders and taking more prisoner. They also made an unsuccessful siege of St. George's Fort in Thomaston, Maine.

In early July 1724, a militia of sixty Mi'kmaq and Maliseet raided Annapolis Royal. They killed and scalped a sergeant and a private, wounded four more soldiers, and terrorized the village. They also burned houses and took prisoners. The British responded by executing one of the Mi'kmaq hostages on the same spot the sergeant was killed. They also burned three Acadian houses in retaliation.

As a result of the raid, three blockhouses were built to protect the town. The Acadian church was moved closer to the fort so that it could be more easily monitored.

In 1725, sixty Abenaki and Mi'kmaq launched another attack on Canso, destroying two houses and killing six people.

The treaty that ended the war marked a significant shift in European relations with the Mi'kmaq and Maliseet. For the first time a European empire formally acknowledged that its dominion over Nova Scotia would have to be negotiated with the region's indigenous inhabitants. The treaty was invoked as recently as 1999 in the Donald Marshall case.

=== King George's War ===
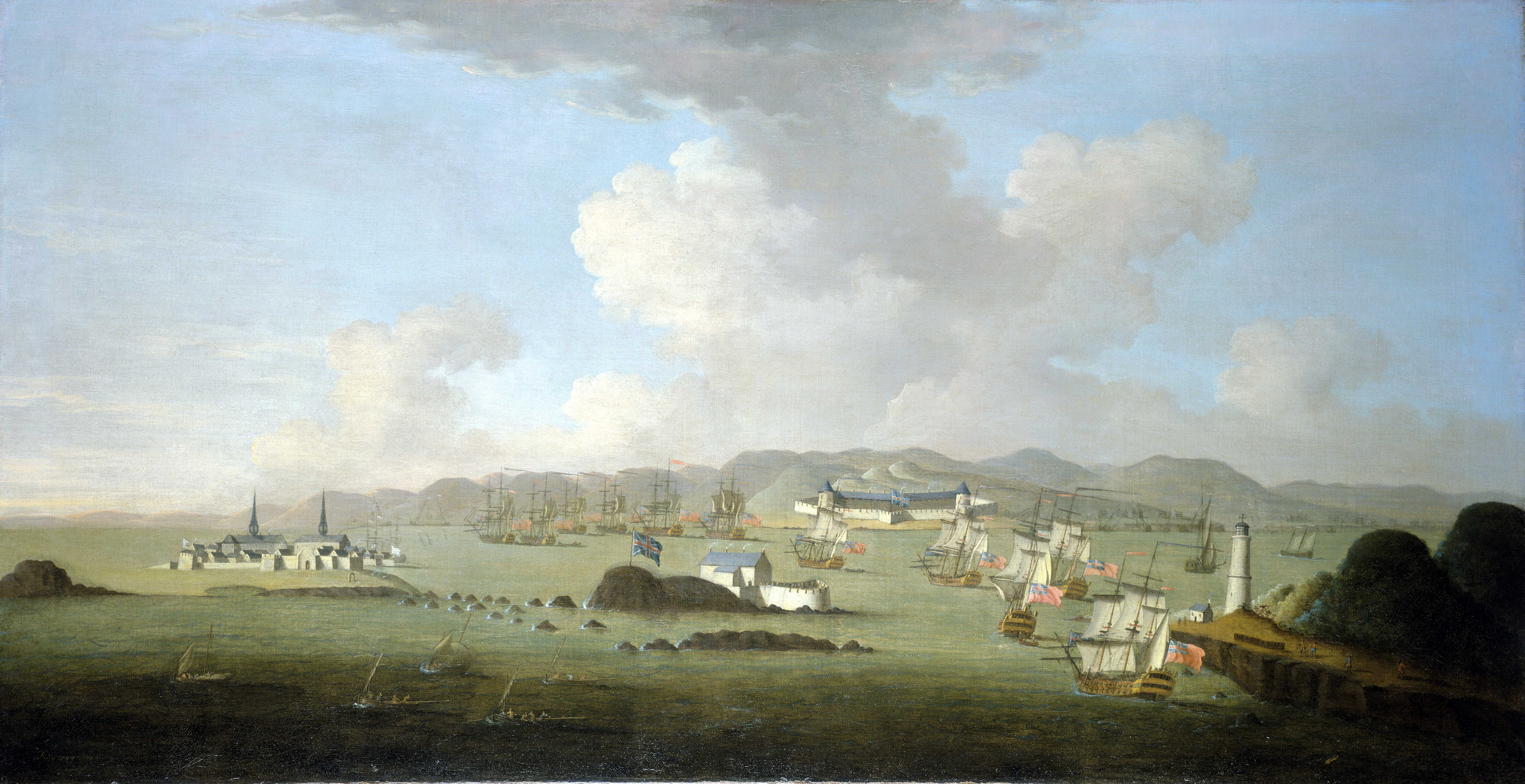
Siege of Louisbourg (1745) by Peter Monamy

News of war declarations reached the French fortress at Louisbourg first, on 3 May 1744, and the forces there wasted little time in beginning hostilities, which would become known as King George's War. Within a week of the arrival of the news of war a military expedition to Canso was agreed upon, and on 23 May, a flotilla left Louisbourg harbour. In this same month British Captain David Donahue of the Resolution took prisoner the chief of the Mi'kmaq people of Île-Royale Jacques Pandanuques with his family to Boston and killed him. Donahue used the same strategy of posing as a French ship to entrap Chief Pandanuques as he does in the Naval battle off Tatamagouche, after which Donahue was tortured and killed by the Mi'kmaq.

Concerned about their overland supply lines to Quebec and seeking revenge for the death of their chief, the Mi'kmaq and French first raided the British fishing port of Canso on 23 May. In response, Governor Shirley of Massachusetts declared war against the Mi'kmaq and put a bounty out for their scalps. The Mi'kmaq and French then organized an attack on Annapolis Royal, then the capital of Nova Scotia. However, French forces were delayed in departing Louisbourg, and their Mi'kmaq and Maliseet allies decided to attack on their own in early July. Annapolis had received news of the war declaration, and was somewhat prepared when the Indians began besieging Fort Anne. Lacking heavy weapons, the Indians withdrew after a few days. Then, in mid-August, a larger French force arrived before Fort Anne, but was also unable to mount an effective attack or siege against the garrison, which was relieved by the New England company of Gorham's Rangers. Gorham led his native rangers in a surprise raid on a nearby Mi'kmaq encampment. They killed and mutilated the bodies of women and children. The Mi'kmaq withdrew and Duvivier was forced to retreat back to Grand Pre on October 5.

During the siege of Annapolis Royal, the Mi'kmaq and Maliseet took prisoner William Pote and some of Gorham's Rangers. Pote was taken to the Maliseet village Aukpaque on the Saint John River. While at the village, Mi'kmaq from Nova Scotia arrived and, on 6 July 6 1745, tortured him and a Mohawk ranger from Gorham's company named Jacob, as retribution for the killing of their family members by Ranger John Gorham during the Siege of Annapolis Royal (1744). On July 10, Pote witnessed another act of revenge when the Mi'kmaq tortured a Mohawk ranger from Gorham's company at Meductic.

==== Naval battle off Tatamagouche ====
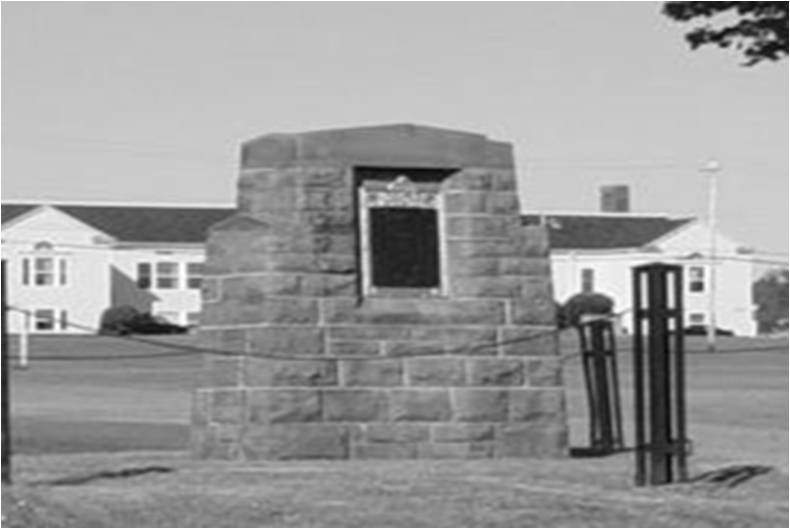
Naval Battle off Tatamagouche

Many Mi'kmaq warriors and French Officer Paul Marin de la Malgue were thwarted from helping to protect Louisbourg by Captain Donahew, who defeated them in the naval battle off Tatamagouche (and had earlier killed the Mi'kmaq chief of Cape Breton). In 1745, British colonial forces conducted the siege of Port Toulouse (St. Peter's) and then captured Fortress Louisbourg after a siege of six weeks. Weeks after the fall of Louisbourg, Donahew and Fones again engaged Marin, who was now nearing the Strait of Canso. Donahew and 11 of his men put ashore and were immediately surrounded by 300 Indians. The captain and five of his men were slain and the remaining six were taken prisoner. The Indians were said to have cut open Donahew's chest, sucked his blood, then eaten parts of him and his five companions. This tale significantly heightened the sense of gloom and frustration settling over the fortress. On July 19, the 12-gun provincial cruiser of Donavan's the Resolution sailed slowly into the harbour with her colours flying at half-mast. The horrifying tale of the fate of her captain, David Donahew, and five crew members spread rapidly through the fortress. Miꞌkmaw fighters remained outside Louisbourg, striking at those who went for firewood or food.

In response to the siege of Louisbourg, Mi'kmaq warriors engage in the Northeast Coast campaign. The Campaign began when, on 19 July, Mi'kmaq from Nova Scotia, Maliseet and some from St. Francois attacked Fort St. George (Thomaston) and New Castle. They set fire to numerous buildings; killed cattle and took one villager captive. They also killed a person at Saco.

In 1745, Mi'kmaq killed seven English crew at LaHave, Nova Scotia and brought their scalps to Sieur Marin. The English did not dry any fish on the east coast of Acadia for fear of being killed by the Mi'kmaq. By the end of 1745, French reports were clear that, "the English have been deterred from forming any settlement in Acadia solely by the dread of these Indians" and that the French see themselves under native "protection".

France launched a major expedition to recover Acadia in 1746. Beset by storms, disease, and finally the death of its commander, the Duc d'Anville, it returned to France in tatters without reaching its objective. The disease of the crew, in turn, spread throughout the Mi'kmaq tribes killing hundreds. (Note: Beamish Murdoch wrote that the French were the cause of the epidemic. In contrast, Father Malliard claims that the epidemic was the result of the Mi'kmaq purchasing infected trade goods from New England colonists.)

==== Newfoundland ====
In response to the Newfoundland campaign, the following year the Mi'kmaq militia from Île-Royale raiding various British outposts in Newfoundland in August 1745. They attacked several British houses, taking 23 prisoners. The following spring the Mi'kmaq began to take 12 of the prisoners to a rendezvous point close to St. John's, en route to Quebec. The British prisoners managed to kill their Mi'kmaq captors at the rendezvous site near St. John. Two days later, another group of Mi'kmaq took the remaining 11 British prisoners to the same rendezvous point. Discovering the fate of the Mi'kmaq captors, the other Mi'kmaq killed the remaining 11 British prisoners.

=== Father Le Loutre's War ===
Despite the British Conquest of Acadia in 1710, Nova Scotia remained primarily occupied by Catholic Acadians and Mi'kmaq. To prevent the establishment of Protestant settlements in the region, Mi'kmaq raided the early British settlements of present-day Shelburne (1715) and Canso (1720). A generation later, Father Le Loutre's War began when Edward Cornwallis arrived to establish Halifax with 13 transports on June 21, 1749. (Note: The framework Father Le Loutre's War is developed by John Grenier in his books The Far Reaches of Empire. War in Nova Scotia, 1710–1760. and The First Way of War: American War Making on the Frontier, 1607–1814. He outlines his rational for naming these conflicts as Father Le Loutre's War) The Mi'kmaq viewed the establishment of Halifax as a violating of a treaty they had signed with British colonial authorities in 1726 after Father Rale's War. The British quickly began to build other settlements. To guard against Mi'kmaq, Acadian, and French attacks on the new Protestant settlements, British fortifications were erected in Halifax (Citadel Hill) (1749), Bedford (Fort Sackville) (1749), Dartmouth (1750), Lunenburg (1753) and Lawrencetown (1754). There were numerous Miꞌkmaw and Acadian raids on these villages such as the Raid on Dartmouth (1751).

Within 18 months of establishing Halifax, the British also took firm control of peninsula Nova Scotia by building fortifications in all the major Acadian communities: present-day Windsor (Fort Edward); Grand Pre (Fort Vieux Logis) and Chignecto (Fort Lawrence). (A British fort already existed at the other major Acadian centre of Annapolis Royal, Nova Scotia. Cobequid remained without a fort.) There were numerous Mi'kmaq and Acadian raids on these fortifications.

==== Raid on Dartmouth ====
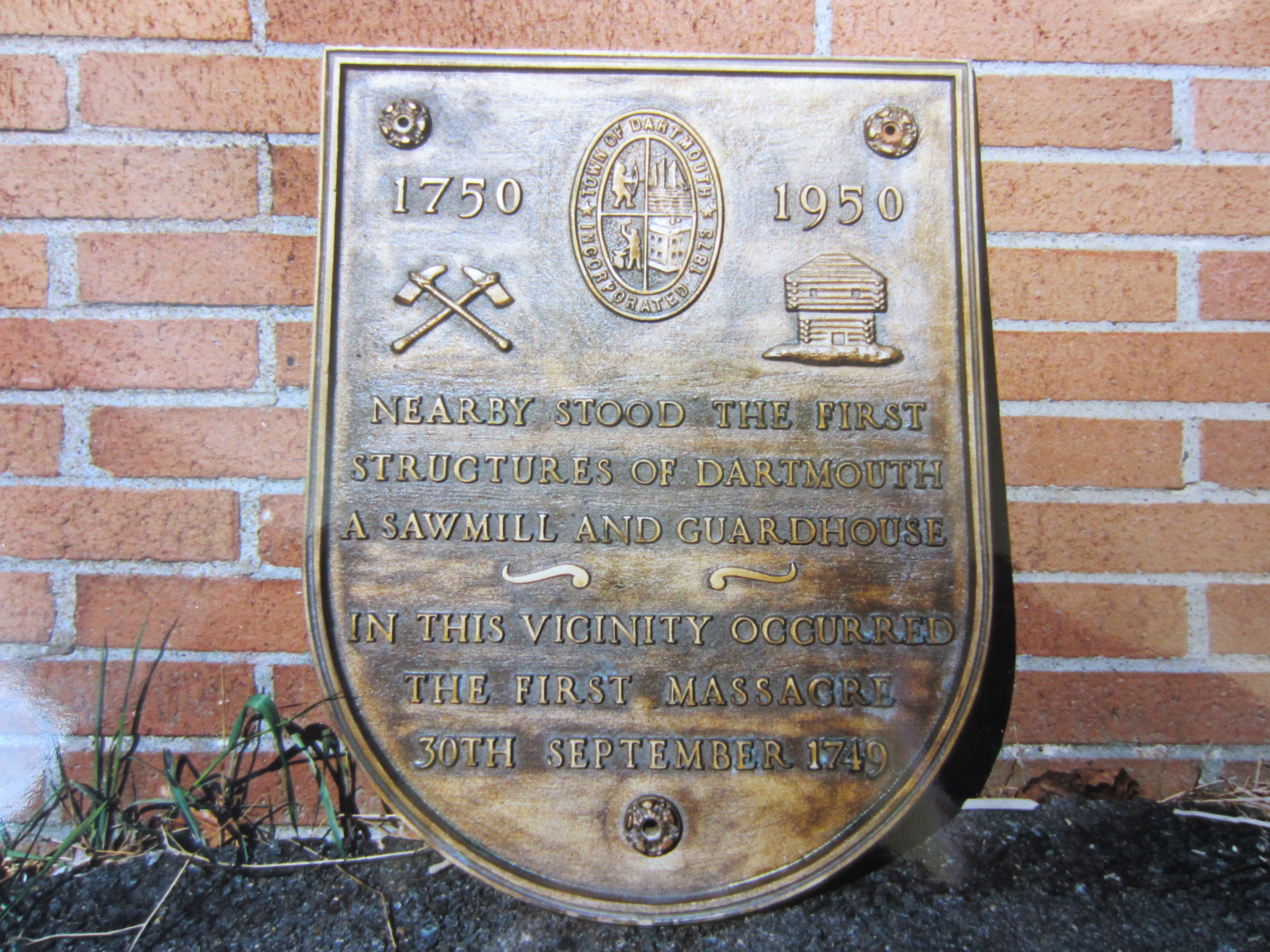
Plaque to Raid on Dartmouth (1749) and the blockhouse that was built in response (1750), Dartmouth Heritage Museum

On 24 September 1749, the Mi'kmaq formally declared their hostility to the British plans for Halifax without more formal negotiations. On 30 September 1749, about forty Mi'kmaq attacked six men, who were under the command of Major Gilman, who were in Dartmouth, Nova Scotia cutting trees near a saw mill. Four of them were killed on the spot, one was taken prisoner and one escaped. (Note: For the primary sources that document the Raids on Dartmouth see:) Two of the men were scalped and the heads of the others were cut off. Major Gilman and others in his party escaped and gave the alarm. A detachment of rangers was sent after the raiding party and cut off the heads of two Mi'kmaq and scalped one. This raid was the first of eight against Dartmouth during the war.

==== Siege of Grand Pre ====
Two months later, on 27 November 1749, 300 Mi'kmaq, Maliseet, and Acadians attacked Fort Vieux Logis, recently established by the British in the Acadian community of Grand Pre. The fort was under the command of Captain Handfield. The Native and Acadian militia killed the sentries (guards) who were firing on them. The Natives then captured Lieutenant John Hamilton and eighteen soldiers under his command, while surveying the fort's environs. After the British soldiers were captured, the native and Acadian militias made several attempts over the next week to lay siege to the fort before breaking off the engagement. Gorham's Rangers was sent to relieve the fort. When he arrived, the militia had already departed with the prisoners. The prisoners spent several years in captivity before being ransomed. There was no fighting over the winter months, which was common in frontier warfare.

==== Battle at St. Croix ====
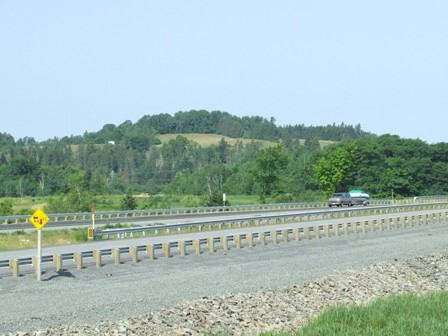
"Battle Hill", St. Croix, Nova Scotia

The following spring, on 18 March 1750, John Gorham and his Rangers left Fort Sackville (at present day Bedford, Nova Scotia), under orders from Governor Cornwallis, to march to Piziquid (present day Windsor, Nova Scotia). Gorham's mission was to establish a blockhouse at Piziquid, which became Fort Edward, and to seize the property of Acadians who had participated in the Siege of Grand Pre.

Arriving at about noon on 20 March at the Acadian village of Five Houses beside the St. Croix River, Gorham and his men found all the houses deserted. Seeing a group of Mi'kmaq hiding in the bushes on the opposite shore, the Rangers opened fire. The skirmish deteriorated into a siege, with Gorham's men taking refuge in a sawmill and two of the houses. During the fighting, the Rangers suffered three wounded, including Gorham, who sustained a bullet in the thigh. As the fighting intensified, a request was sent back to Fort Sackville for reinforcements.

Responding to the call for assistance on 22 March, Governor Cornwallis ordered Captain William Clapham's and Captain St. Loe's Regiments, equipped with two field guns, to join Gorham at Piziquid. The additional troops and artillery turned the tide for Gorham and forced the Mi'kmaq to withdraw.

Gorham proceeded to present-day Windsor and forced Acadians to dismantle their church—Notre Dame de l'Assomption—so that Fort Edward could be built in its place.

==== Raids on Halifax ====
Soldiers of the 29th Foot guarding Halifax, Nova Scotia against Miꞌkmaw raids

There were four raids on Halifax during the war. The first raid happened in October 1750, while in the woods on peninsular Halifax, Mi'kmaq scalped two British people and took six prisoner: Cornwallis' gardener, his son were tortured and scalped. The Mi'kmaq buried the son while the gardener's body was left behind and the other six persons were taken prisoner to Grand Pre for five months. Another author, Thomas Akins, puts the month of this raid in July and writes that there were six British attacked, two were scalped and four were taken prisoner and never seen again. Shortly after this raid, Cornwallis learned that the Mi'kmaq had received payment from the French at Chignecto for five prisoners taken at Halifax as well as prisoners taken earlier at Dartmouth and Grand Pre.

In 1751, there were two attacks on blockhouses surrounding Halifax. Mi'kmaq attacked the North Blockhouse (located at the north end of Joseph Howe Drive) and killed the men on guard. Mi'kmaq also attacked near the South Blockhouse (located at the south end of Joseph Howe Drive), at a sawmill on a stream flowing out of Chocolate Lake into the Northwest Arm. They killed two men.

==== Raids on Dartmouth ====
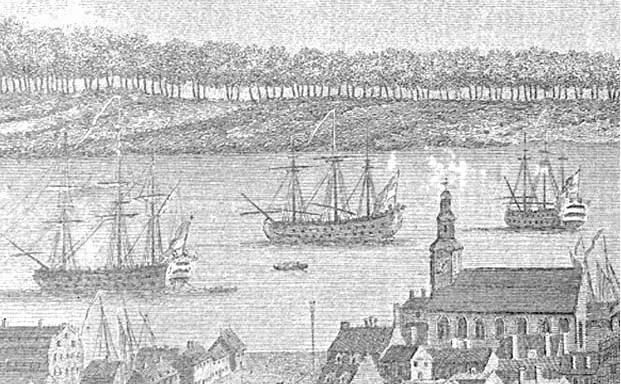
British erect a wooden palisade along Dartmouth in response to the Raid, opposite side of the harbour from the Great Pontack (Lower left corner), present-day Historic Properties

There were six raids on Dartmouth during this time period. In July 1750, the Mi'kmaq killed and scalped 7 men who were at work in Dartmouth.

In August 1750, 353 people arrived on the Alderney and began the town of Dartmouth. The town was laid out in the autumn of that year. The following month, on September 30, 1750, Dartmouth was attacked again by the Mi'kmaq and five more residents were killed. In October 1750 a group of about eight men went out "to take their diversion; and as they were fowling, they were attacked by the Indians, who took the whole prisoners; scalped ... [one] with a large knife, which they wear for that purpose, and threw him into the sea ..."

The following spring, on March 26, 1751, the Mi'kmaq attacked again, killing fifteen settlers and wounding seven, three of which would later die of their wounds. They took six captives, and the regulars who pursued the Mi'kmaq fell into an ambush in which they lost a sergeant killed. Two days later, on March 28, 1751, Mi'kmaq abducted another three settlers.

Two months later, on 13 May 1751, Broussard led sixty Mi'kmaq and Acadians to attack Dartmouth again, in what would be known as the "Dartmouth Massacre". Broussard and the others killed twenty settlers—mutilating men, women, children and babies—and took more prisoner. (Note: Cornwallis' official report mentioned that four settlers were killed and six soldiers taken prisoner. (Governor Cornwallis to Board of Trade, letter, June 24, 1751.) John Wilson reported that fifteen people were killed immediately, seven were wounded, three of whom would die in hospital; six were carried away and never seen again".) A sergeant was also killed and his body mutilated. They destroyed the buildings. Captain William Clapham and sixty soldiers were on duty and fired from the blockhouse. The British killed six Mi'kmaq warriors, but were only able to retrieve one scalp that they took to Halifax. Those at a camp at Dartmouth Cove, led by John Wisdom, assisted the settlers. Upon returning to their camp the next day they found the Mi'kmaq had also raided their camp and taken a prisoner. All the settlers were scalped by the Mi'kmaq. The British took what remained of the bodies to Halifax for burial in the Old Burying Ground. Douglas William Trider list the 34 people who were buried in Halifax between 13 May – 15 June 1751; four of whom were soldiers.

In 1752, the Mi'kmaq attacks on the British along the coast, both east and west of Halifax, were frequent. Those who were engaged in the fisheries were compelled to stay on land because they were the primary targets. In early July, New Englanders killed and scalped two Mi'kmaq girls and one boy off the coast of Cape Sable (Port La Tour, Nova Scotia). In August, at St. Peter's, Nova Scotia, Mi'kmaq seized two schooners—the Friendship from Halifax and the Dolphin from New England—along with 21 prisoners who were captured and ransomed.

On 14 September 1752, Governor Peregrine Hopson and the Nova Scotia Council negotiated the 1752 Peace Treaty with Jean-Baptiste Cope. (The treaty was signed officially on 22 November 1752.) Cope was unsuccessful in getting support for the treaty from other Mi'kmaq leaders. Cope burned the treaty six months after he signed it. Despite the collapse of peace on the eastern shore, the British did not formally renounce the Treaty of 1752 until 1756.

==== Attack at Mocodome (Country Harbour) ====
On 21 February 1753, nine Mi'kmaq from Nartigouneche (present-day Antigonish, Nova Scotia) in canoes attacked a British vessel at Country Harbour, Nova Scotia. The vessel was from Canso, Nova Scotia and had a crew of four. The Mi'kmaq fired on them and drove them toward the shore. Other natives joined in and boarded the schooner, forcing them to run their vessel into an inlet. The Mi'kmaq killed and scalped two of the British and took two others captive. After seven weeks in captivity, on 8 April, the two British prisoners killed six Mi'kmaq and managed to escape. Stephen Patterson reports the attack happened on the coast between Country Harbour and Tor Bay. Whitehead reports the location was a little harbour to the westward of Torbay, "Martingo", "port of Mocodome". Beamish Murdoch in An History of Nova-Scotia, or Acadie, Volume 1 identifies Mocodome as present-day "Country Harbour". The Mi'kmaq claimed the British schooner was accidentally shipwrecked and some of the crew drowned. They also indicated that two men died of illness while the other killed the six Mi'kmaq despite their hospitality. The French officials did not believe the Mi'kmaq account of events. The Mi'kmaq account of this attack was that the two English died of natural causes and the other two killed six of the Mi'kmaq for their scalps.

==== Attack at Jeddore ====
In response, on the night of 21 April, under the leadership of Chief Jean-Baptiste Cope and the Mi'kmaq attacked another British schooner in a battle at sea off Jeddore, Nova Scotia. On board were nine British men and one Acadian (Casteel), who was the pilot. The Mi'kmaq killed and scalped the British and let the Acadian off at Port Toulouse, where the Mi'kmaq sank the schooner after looting it. In August 1752, the Mi'kmaq at Saint Peter's seized the schooners Friendship of Halifax and Dolphin of New England and took 21 prisoners who they held for ransom.

==== Raid on Halifax ====
In late September 1752, Mi'kmaq scalped a man they had caught outside the Palisade of Fort Sackville. In 1753, when Lawrence became governor, the Mi'kmaq attacked again upon the sawmills near the South Blockhouse on the Northwest Arm, where they killed three British. The Mi'kmaq made three attempts to retrieve the bodies for their scalps. On the otherside of the harbour in Dartmouth, in 1753, there were reported only to be five families, all of whom refused to farm for fear of being attacked if they left the confines of the picketed fence around the village.

In May 1753, Natives scalped two British soldiers at Fort Lawrence. Throughout 1753, French authorities on Cape Breton Island were paying Mi'kmaq warriors for the scalps of the British.

==== Raid on Lawrencetown ====
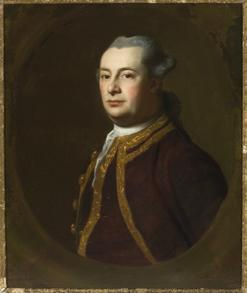
Michael Francklin taken captive by Miꞌkmaq (1754)

In 1754, the British unilaterally established Lawrencetown. In late April 1754, Beausoleil and a large band of Mi'kmaq and Acadians left Chignecto for Lawrencetown. They arrived in mid-May and in the night opened fire on the village. Beausoleil killed and scalped four British settlers and two soldiers. By August, as the raids continued, the residents and soldiers were withdrawn to Halifax. By June 1757, the settlers had to be withdrawn completely again from the settlement of Lawrencetown because the number of Native raids eventually prevented settlers from leaving their houses.

Prominent Halifax business person Michael Francklin was captured by a Mi'kmaq raiding party in 1754 and held captive for three months.

=== French and Indian War ===
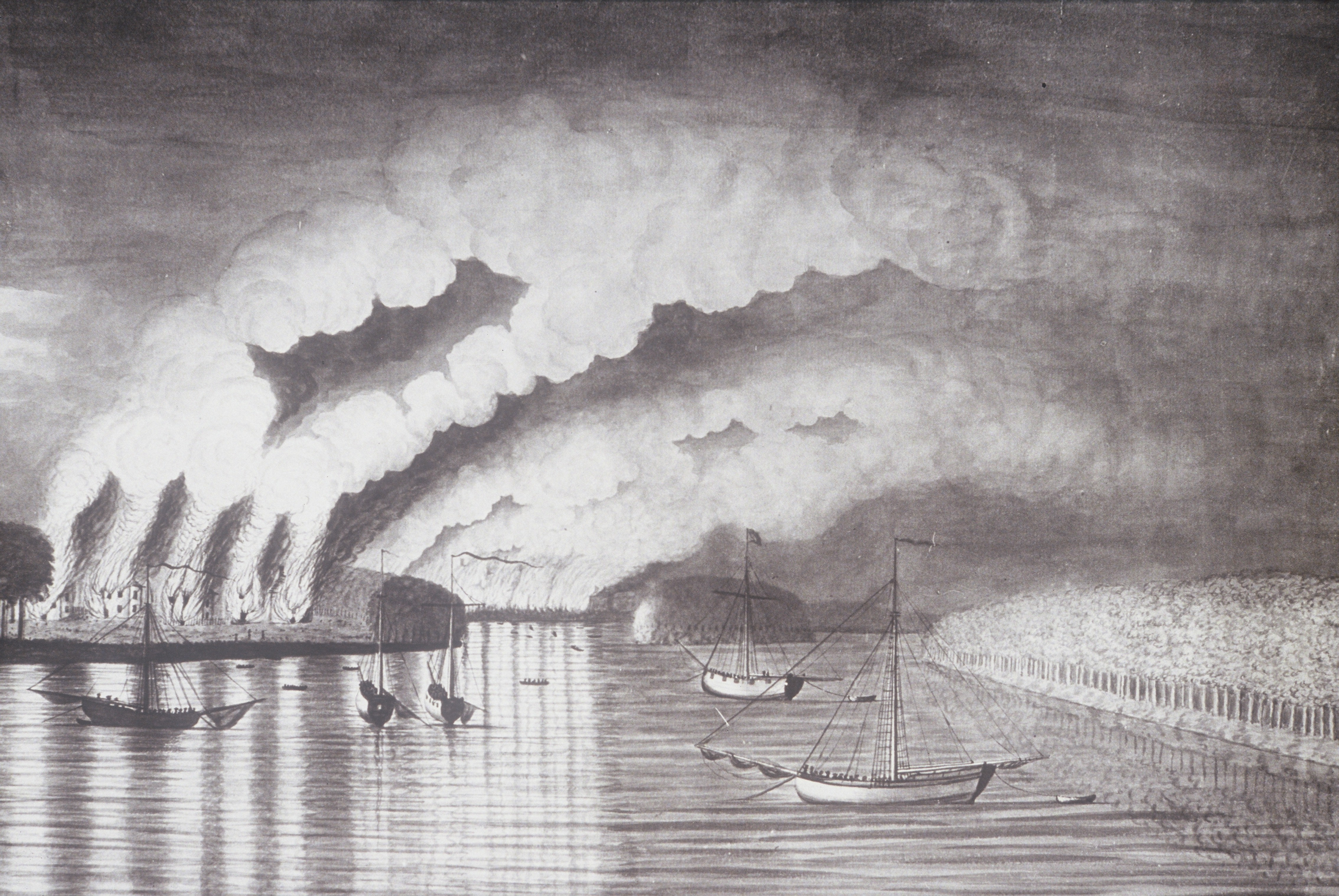
St. John River Campaign: A View of the Plundering and Burning of the City of Grimross (present day Arcadia, New Brunswick) by Thomas Davies in 1758. This is the only contemporaneous image of the Expulsion of the Acadians.

The final colonial war was the French and Indian War. The British conquest of Acadia happened in 1710. Over the next forty-five years the Acadians refused to sign an unconditional oath of allegiance to Britain. During this time period Acadians participated in various militia operations against the British and maintained vital supply lines to the French Fortress of Louisbourg and Fort Beausejour.

During the French and Indian War, the British sought to neutralize any military threat Acadians and Mi'kmaq militias posed within Nova Scotia but particularly to the northern New England border in Maine. The British wanted to prevent future attacks from the Wabanaki Confederacy, French and Acadians on the northern New England border. (There was a long history of these attacks from Acadia—see the Northeast Coast Campaigns 1688, 1703, 1723, 1724, 1745, 1746, 1747.) The British saw the Acadians' allegiance to the French and the Wabanaki Confederacy as a military threat. Father Le Loutre's War had created the conditions for total war; British civilians had not been spared and, as Governor Charles Lawrence and the Nova Scotia Council saw it, Acadian civilians had provided intelligence, sanctuary, and logistical support while others had fought against the British.

Within Acadia, the British also wanted to interrupt the vital supply lines Acadians provided to Louisbourg by deporting Acadians from Acadia. Defeating Louisbourg, would also mean defeating the ally which provided the Mi'kmaq ammunition to fight.

The British began the Expulsion of the Acadians with the Bay of Fundy Campaign (1755). Over the next nine years over 12,000 Acadians were removed from Nova Scotia. The Acadians were scattered across the Atlantic, in the Thirteen Colonies, Louisiana, Quebec, Britain, and France. Very few eventually returned to Nova Scotia. During the various campaigns of the expulsion, the Acadian and Native resistance to the British intensified.

During the expulsion, French Officer Charles Deschamps de Boishébert led the Mi'kmaq and the Acadians in a guerrilla war against the British. According to Louisbourg account books, by late 1756, the French had regularly dispensed supplies to 700 Natives. From 1756 to the fall of Louisbourg in 1758, the French made regular payments to Chief Jean-Baptiste Cope and other natives for British scalps.

==== Raids on Annapolis (Fort Anne) ====
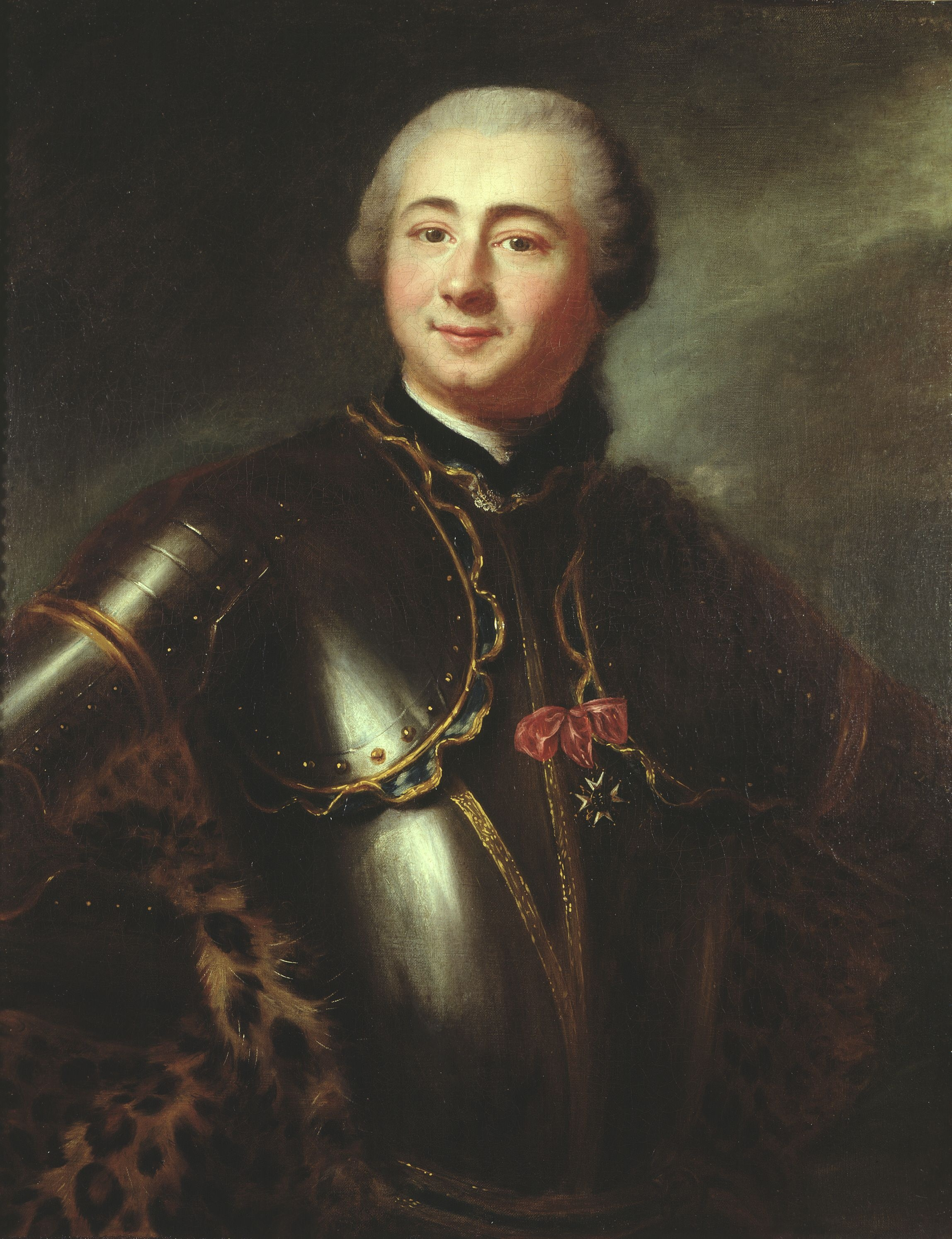
Charles Deschamps de Boishébert et de Raffetot

The Acadians and Mi'kmaq fought in the Annapolis region. They were victorious in the Battle of Bloody Creek. Acadians being deported from Annapolis Royal, Nova Scotia on the ship Pembroke rebelled against the British crew. After fighting off an attack by another British vessel on 9 February 1756, the Acadians took 8 British prisoners to Quebec.

In December 1757, while cutting firewood near Fort Anne, the Mi'kmaq warriors captured John Weatherspoon and carried him away to the mouth of the Miramichi River. From there he was eventually sold or traded to the French and taken to Quebec, where he was held until late in 1759 and the Battle of the Plains of Abraham, when General Wolfe's forces prevailed.

About 50 or 60 Acadians who escaped the initial deportation are reported to have made their way to the Cape Sable region (which included south western Nova Scotia). From there, they participated in numerous raids on Lunenburg, Nova Scotia.

Oral history indicates that a Samuel Rogers led a massacre against a Mi'kmaq village at Rogers Point (present-day Point Prim), Digby in the autumn of 1759. (Note: Isaiah W. Wilson (1900) recorded this account in his book Geography and History of Digby County.) Daniel N. Paul (2006) and Jon Tattrie (2013) have repeated the account as historical fact. Paul has described it as the "Last overt act of genocide committed by the English against Nova Scotia's Mi'kmaq".

The story is said to have originated from someone who participated in the raid under the leadership of Samuel Rogers. The oral history indicates that Rogers was an active member of the famous Rogers' Rangers and of equal stature to George Scott. This Samuel Rogers is also said to be the same one who was later a member of the House of Assembly of Nova Scotia for Sackville (present-day Sackville, New Brunswick).

These descriptions of Samuel Rogers leave the credibility of the story in serious doubt. Samuel Rogers and this expedition could not have been related to Rogers' Rangers because there were no Rogers' Rangers in Nova Scotia in the autumn of 1759. There were only four companies of Rogers' Rangers to ever fight in the colony and they departed on 6 June 1759 and were never in the western region of the colony. As well, had there been a military officer of equal stature to George Scott in the colony, certainly there would be official records that support his existence, when there is not.

The Samuel Rogers of the oral tradition could not be the same Samuel Rogers who was later a member of the House of Assembly in 1775 (who was famous for becoming a leader in the siege of Fort Cumberland). This Samuel Rogers was never connected to Rogers' Rangers and he died in 1831. Had he lived until he was age 90, he would have only been age 18 when he reached George Scott's stature and led the charge on the village.

==== Raids on Piziquid (Fort Edward) ====
In the April 1757, a band of Acadian and Mi'kmaq raided a warehouse near Fort Edward, killing thirteen British soldiers. After loading with what provisions they could carry, they set fire to the building. A few days later, the same partisans also raided Fort Cumberland. Because of the strength of the Acadian militia and Mi'kmaq militia, British officer John Knox wrote that "In the year 1757 we were said to be Masters of the province of Nova Scotia, or Acadia, which, however, was only an imaginary possession … " He continues to state that the situation in the province was so precarious for the British that the "troops and inhabitants" at Fort Edward, Fort Sackville and Lunenburg "could not be reputed in any other light than as prisoners."

==== Raids on Chignecto (Fort Cumberland) ====
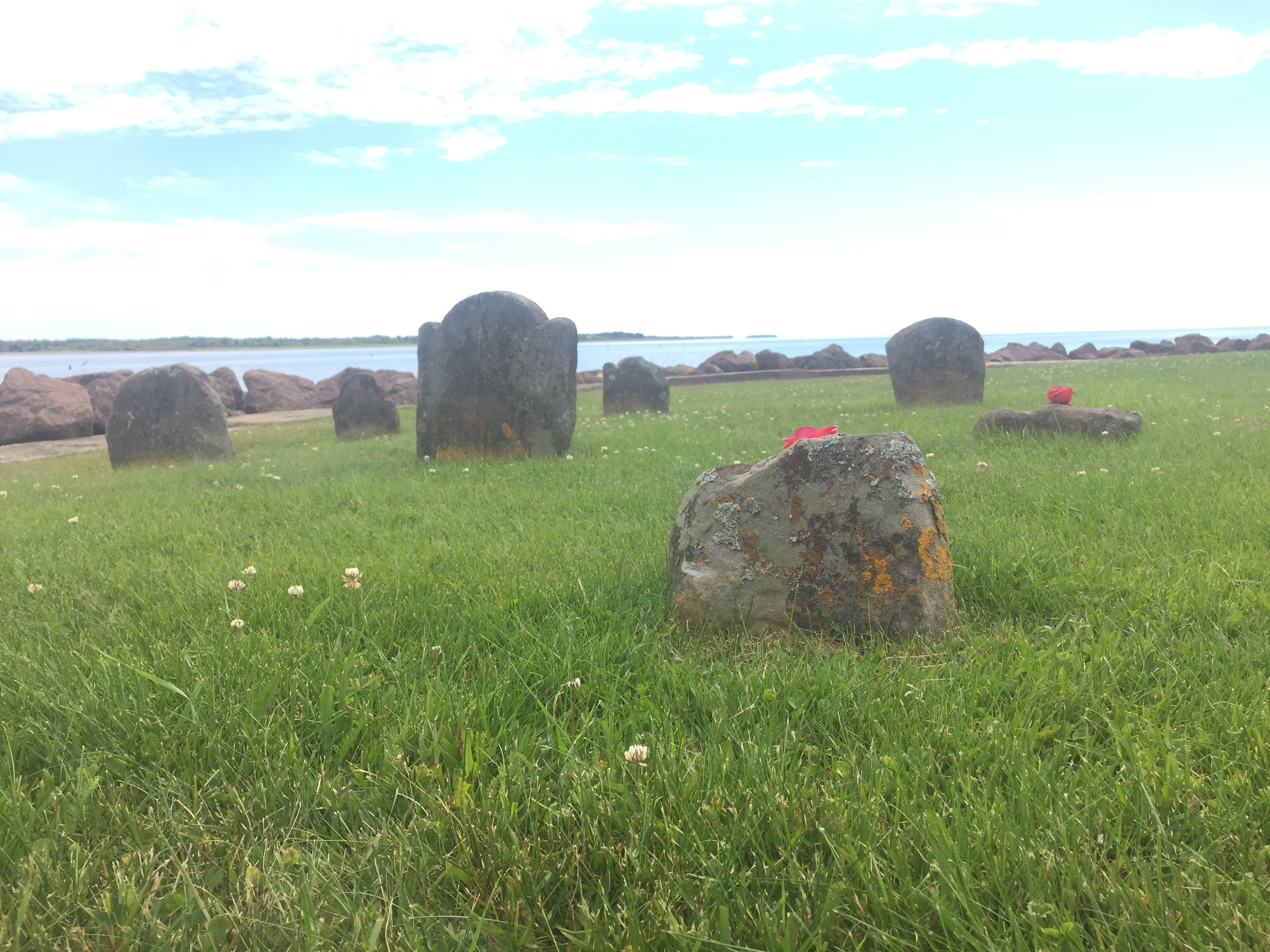
British Gravestones from the Miꞌkmaw Raid on Fort Monckton (1756) - oldest known British military gravestones in Canada

The Acadians and Mi'kmaq also resisted in the Chignecto region. They were victorious in the Battle of Petitcodiac (1755). In the spring of 1756, a wood-gathering party from Fort Monckton (former Fort Gaspareaux), was ambushed and nine were scalped. In the April 1757, after raiding Fort Edward, the same band of Acadian and Mi'kmaq partisans raided Fort Cumberland, killing and scalping two men and taking two prisoners. On 20 July 1757, Mi'kmaq killed 23 and captured two of Gorham's rangers outside Fort Cumberland near present-day Jolicure, New Brunswick. In March 1758, forty Acadian and Mi'kmaq attacked a schooner at Fort Cumberland and killed its master and two sailors. In the winter of 1759, the Mi'kmaq ambushed five British soldiers on patrol while they were crossing a bridge near Fort Cumberland. They were ritually scalped and their bodies mutilated as was common in frontier warfare. During the night of 4 April 1759, using canoes, a force of Acadians and French captured the transport. At dawn they attacked the ship Moncton and chased it for five hours down the Bay of Fundy. Although the Moncton escaped, its crew suffered one killed and two wounded.

Others resisted during the St. John River Campaign and the Petitcodiac River Campaign.

==== Raids on Lawrencetown ====
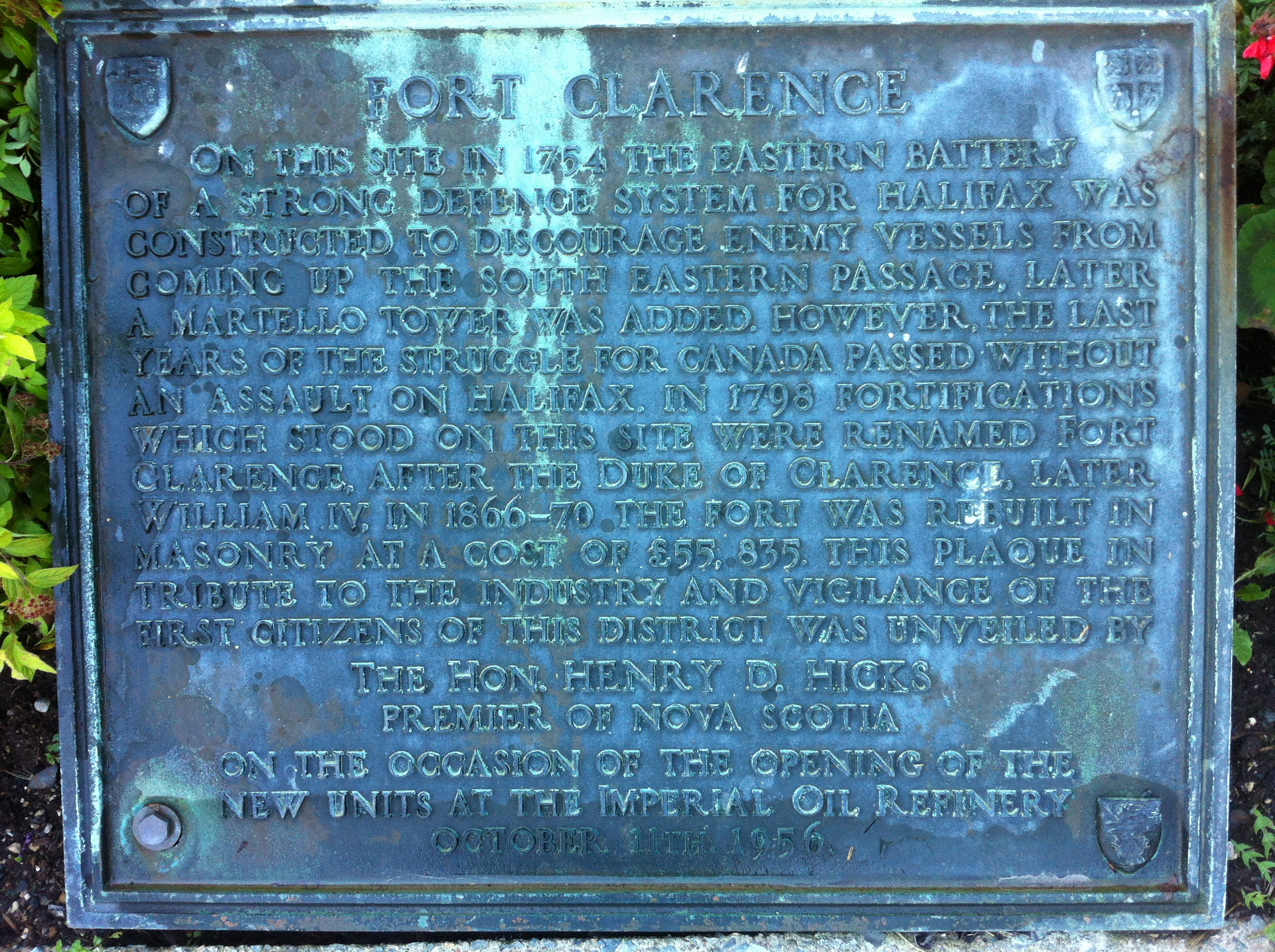
Eastern Battery Plaque, Dartmouth, Nova Scotia

By June 1757, the settlers had to be withdrawn completely from the settlement of Lawrencetown (established 1754) because the number of Indian raids eventually prevented settlers from leaving their houses. On 30 July 1757, Mi'kmaq fighters killed three Roger's Rangers at Lawrencetown.

In nearby Dartmouth, Nova Scotia, in the spring of 1759, there was another Mi'kmaq attack on Eastern Battery, in which five soldiers were killed.

==== Raids on Maine ====
In present-day Maine, the Mi'kmaq and the Maliseet raided numerous New England villages. At the end of April 1755, they raided Gorham, Maine, killing two men and a family. Next they appeared in New Boston (Gray) and through the neighbouring towns destroying the plantations. On 13 May, they raided Frankfort (Dresden), where two men were killed and a house burned. The same day they raided Sheepscot (Newcastle), and took five prisoners. Two were killed in North Yarmouth on May 29 and one taken captive. They shot one person at Teconnet. They took prisoners at Fort Halifax; two prisoners taken at Fort Shirley (Dresden). They took two captive at New Gloucester as they worked on the local fort.

On 13 August 1758, Boishebert left Miramichi, New Brunswick with 400 soldiers, including Acadians which he led from Port Toulouse. They marched to Fort St George (Thomaston, Maine) and Munduncook (Friendship, Maine). While the former siege was unsuccessful, in the latter raid on Munduncook, they wounded eight British settlers and killed others. This was Boishébert's last Acadian expedition. From there, Boishebert and the Acadians went to Quebec and fought in the Battle of Quebec (1759).

==== Raids on Lunenburg ====
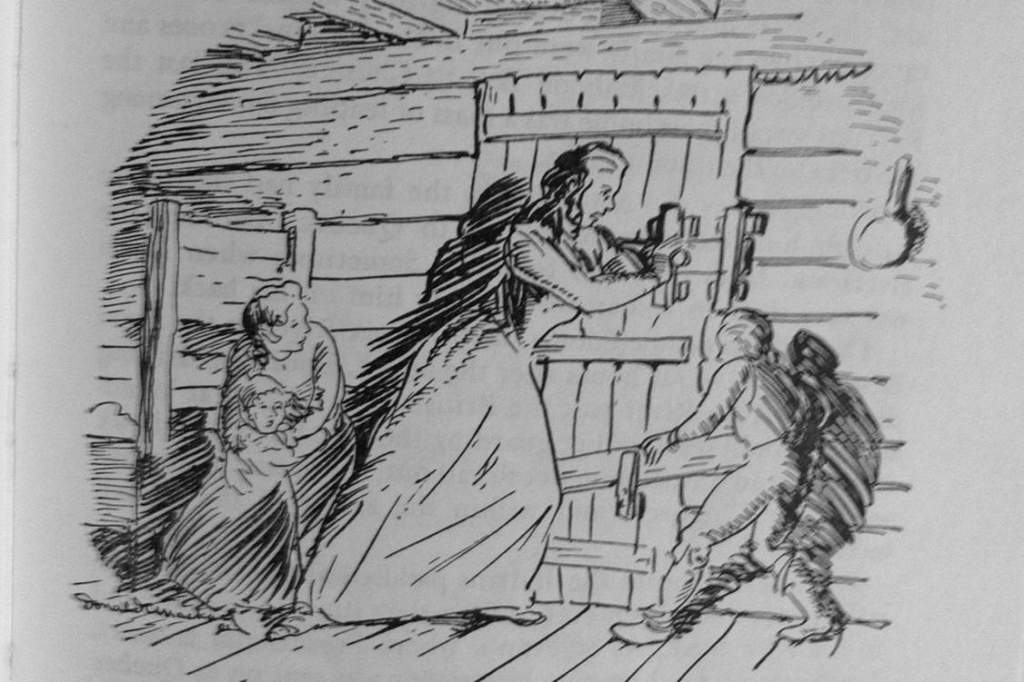
Raid on Lunenburg (1756) by Donald A. Mackay

The Acadians and Mi'kmaq raided the Lunenburg settlement nine times over a three-year period during the war. Boishebert ordered the first Raid on Lunenburg. In response to the raid, a week later, on 14 May 1756, Governor of Nova Scotia Charles Lawrence put a bounty on Mi'kmaq scalps. Following the raid of 1756, in 1757, there was a raid on Lunenburg in which six people from the Brissang family were killed. The following year, the Lunenburg Campaign (1758) began with a raid on the Lunenburg Peninsula at the Northwest Range (present-day Blockhouse, Nova Scotia) when five people were killed from the Ochs and Roder families. By the end of May 1758, most of those on the Lunenburg Peninsula abandoned their farms and retreated to the protection of the fortifications around the town of Lunenburg, losing the season for sowing their grain. For those that did not leave their farms for the town, the number of raids intensified.

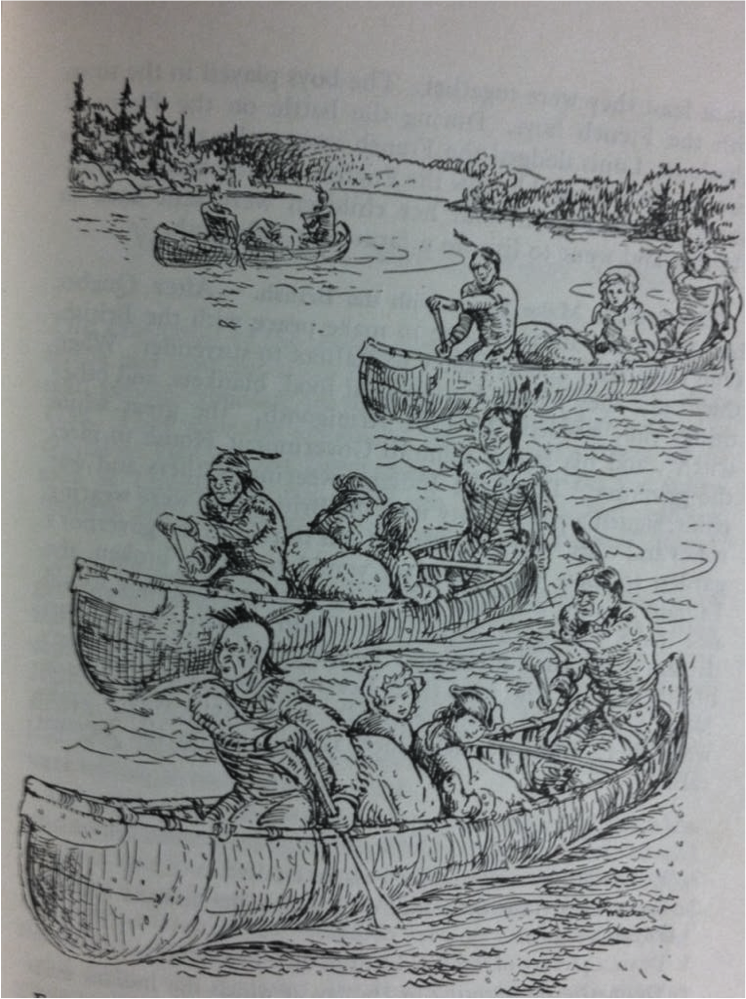
Mi'kmaq take Marie Anne Payzant (far right) captive with her children

During the summer of 1758, there were four raids on the Lunenburg Peninsula. On 13 July 1758, one person on the LaHave River at Dayspring was killed and another seriously wounded by a member of the Labrador family. The next raid happened at Mahone Bay, Nova Scotia on 24 August 1758, when eight Mi'kmaq attacked the family homes of Lay and Brant. While they killed three people in the raid, the Mi'kmaq were unsuccessful in taking their scalps, which was the common practice for payment from the French. Two days, later, two soldiers were killed in a raid on the blockhouse at LaHave, Nova Scotia. Almost two weeks later, on 11 September, a child was killed in a raid on the Northwest Range. Another raid happened on 27 March 1759, in which three members of the Oxner family were killed. The last raid happened on 20 April 1759. The Mi'kmaq killed four settlers at Lunenburg who were members of the Trippeau and Crighton families.

==== Raids on Halifax ====
On 2 April 1756, Mi'kmaq received payment from the Governor of Quebec for 12 British scalps taken at Halifax. Acadian Pierre Gautier, son of Joseph-Nicolas Gautier, led Mi'kmaq warriors from Louisbourg on three raids against Halifax in 1757. In each raid, Gautier took prisoners or scalps or both. The last raid happened in September and Gautier went with four Mi'kmaq and killed and scalped two British men at the foot of Citadel Hill. (Pierre went on to participate in the Battle of Restigouche.)

Arriving on the provincial vessel King George, four companies of Rogers' Rangers (500 rangers) were at Dartmouth from 8 April to 28 May, awaiting the siege of Louisbourg. While there they scoured the woods to stop raids on the capital. Despite the presence of the Rangers, in April the Miꞌkmaq returned 7 prisoners and 16 scalps to Louisbourg.

In July 1759, Mi'kmaq and Acadians kill five British in Dartmouth, opposite McNabb's Island.

==== Siege of Louisbourg (1758) ====
Acadian militias participated in the defense of Louisbourg in 1757 and 1758. In preparation of a British assault on Louisbourg in 1757, all the tribes of the Wabanaki Confederacy were present including Acadian militia. Without any result from their efforts, the number of Mi'kmaq and Acadians who showed the following year were much lower. The precedent for such a decline in numbers was set in the two attacks that happened in the siege of Annapolis, the Mi'kmaq and Acadians appearing in much less numbers for the second assault after the first one had failed.

New Englanders came ashore at Pointe Platee (Flat Point) during the siege of 1745. In 1757 and again in 1758, the Natives and Acadian militias were stationed at the potential landing beaches of Pointe Platee and one further away Anse d la Cormorandiere (Kennington Cove).

In the siege of Louisbourg, Acadian and Mi'kmaq militias began to arrive in Louisboug around 7 May 1758. By the end of the month 118 Acadians arrived and about 30 Mi'kmaq from Ile St. Jean and the Miramichi. Boishebert arrived in June with 70 more Acadia militia members from Isle Saint-Jean and 60 Mi'kmaq militia. On 2 June, The British vessels arrived and the militias went to their defensive positions on the shore. The 200 British vessels waited for six days, until the weather conditions were right, before they attacked on June 8. Four companies of Rogers' Rangers under the command of George Scott were the first to come ashore in advance of James Wolfe. The British came ashore at Anse de la Cormorandiere and "continuous fire was poured upon the invaders". The Mi'kmaq and Acadian militias fought the Rangers until the latter were supported by Scott and James Wolfe, which led to the militias retreat. Seventy of the militia were captured and 50 others scalped. The Mi'kmaq and Acadian militias killed 100 British, some of whom were wounded and drowned. On June 16, 50 Mi'kmaq returned to the cove and took 5 seaman captive, firing at the other British marines.

On 15 July, Boishebert arrived with Acadian and Mi'kmaq militias and attacked Captain Sutherland and the Rogers' Rangers posted at Northeast harbour. When Scott and Wolfe's reinforcements arrived, 100 Rangers from McCurdey and Brewer's Companies were sent to track them down. They only captured one Mi'kmaq. (From here the Rangers went on to conduct the St. John River campaign, in part, hoping to capture Boishebert.)

==== Battle at St. Aspinquid's Chapel ====
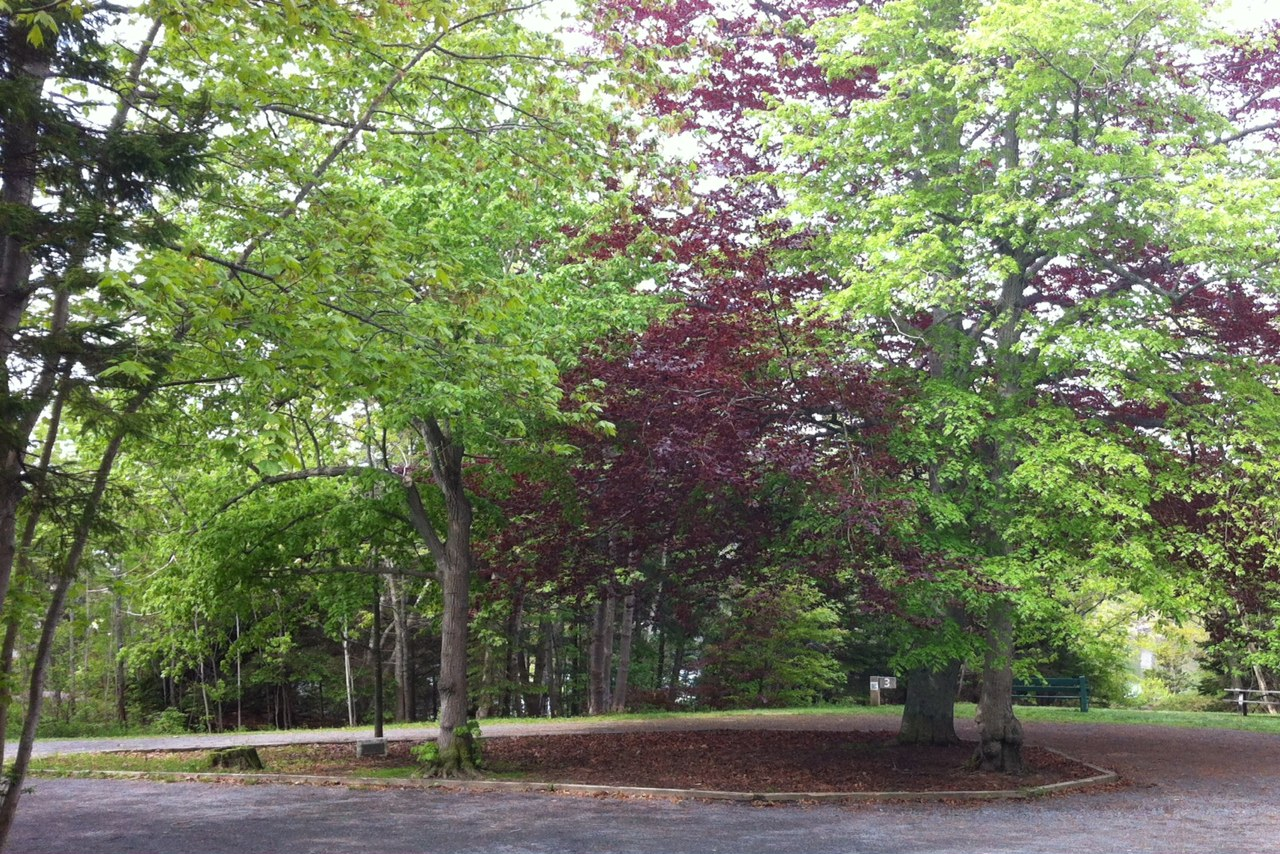
Site of the battle at St. Aspinquid's Chapel (Chain Rock Battery, Point Pleasant Park, Nova Scotia)

Tradition indicates that at St. Aspinquid's Chapel in Point Pleasant Park, Halifax, Lahave Chief Paul Laurent and a party of eleven invited Shubenacadie Chief Jean-Baptiste Cope and five others to St. Aspinquid's Chapel to negotiate peace with the British. (Note: Awalt bases his account on stories from 17 separate Miꞌkmaq accounts from 11 different locations in Nova Scotia. This oral tradition was also recorded by Harry Piers from elders who heard the story in the 19th century.) Chief Paul Laurent had just arrived in Halifax after surrendering to the British at Fort Cumberland on 29 February 1760. In early March 1760, the two parties met and engaged in armed conflict. (Note: None of the oral accounts give the exact date of the battle. Awalt is left to speculate about the date of the battle, which he asserts might be in May 1758 just before siege of Louisbourg. The evidence contradicts this assertion and suggests that the date was more likely March 1760. The two main players of the conflict - Paul Laurent and Jean-Baptiste Cope - both could not have been in Halifax in 1758 as indicated. Laurent was not seeking peace in 1758. Throughout the war Laurent fought the British and did not surrender until 29 February 1760 at Fort Cumberland. The only evidence of Chief Paul being in Halifax after 1755 is when he travels there over the following weeks to sign a peace treaty on March 10, 1760. (See March 10, 1750. Chief Paul and Governor Lawrence. Andrew Browns Manuscripts. British Museum. Further, Cope could not have died before the Siege of Louisbourg because French Officer Chevalier de Johnstone indicated that he saw Cope at Miramichi after the Siege of Louisbourg when Johnstone was en route to Quebec.) Chief Larent's party killed Cope and two others, while Chief Cope's party killed five of the British supporters. Shortly after Cope's death, Mi'kmaq chiefs signed a peace treaty in Halifax on 10 March 1760. Chief Laurent signed on behalf of the Lahave tribe and a new chief, Claude Rene, signed on behalf of the Shubenacadie tribe. (Note: Daniel N. Paul erroneously asserts that "the record shows Cope was still alive in the 1760s, which indicates he may have lived to a ripe old age", The last record of Cope is by Johnstone (1758). The Chief of the Shebenacadie was replaced in 1760, indicating that Cope was dead.) (Note: Paul Laurent's biographer Michael Johnston notes that another chief from La Heve signed another treaty with the English on 9 Nov. 1761.) (During this time of surrender and treaty making, tensions among the various factions who were allied against the British were evident. For example, a few months after the death of Cope, the Mi'kmaq militia and Acadian militias made the rare decisions to continue to fight in the Battle of Restigouche despite losing the support of the French priests who were encouraging surrender.) (Note: Chief Joseph Labrador of Lunenburg supported Chief Cope. He survived the battle and continued his raids on British settlers.)

==== Battle of Restigouche ====
An Acadian militia and Mi'kmaq militia, totalling 1500 militia, organized in the Battle of Restigouche. The Acadians arrived in about 20 schooners and small boats. Along with the French, they continued up river to draw the British fleet closer to the Acadian community of Pointe-à-la-Batterie, where they were ready to launch a surprise attack on the English. The Acadians sunk a number of their vessels to create a blockade, upon which the Acadian and Mi'kmaq fired at the ships. On 27 of June, the British succeeded in maneuvering just beyond the chain of sunken ships. Once the British were range of the battery, they fired on the battery. This skirmish lasted all night and was repeated with various breaks from 28 June to 3 July, when the British overwhelmed Pointe à la Batterie, burning 150 to 200 buildings which made up the Acadian village community at Pointe à la Batterie.

The militias retreated and re-grouped with the French frigate Machault. They sunk more schooners to create another blockade. They created two new batteries, one on the South shore at Pointe de la Mission (today Listuguj, Quebec), and one on the North shore at Pointe aux Sauvages (today Campbellton, New Brunswick). They created blockade with schooners at Pointe aux Sauvages. On July 7, British commander Byron spent the day getting rid of the battery at Pointe aux Sauvages and later returned to the task of destroying the Machault. By the morning of July 8, the Scarborough and the Repulse were in range of the blockade and face to face with the Machault. The British made two attempts to defeat the batteries and the militias held out. On the third attempt, they were successful.

=== Halifax Treaties ===
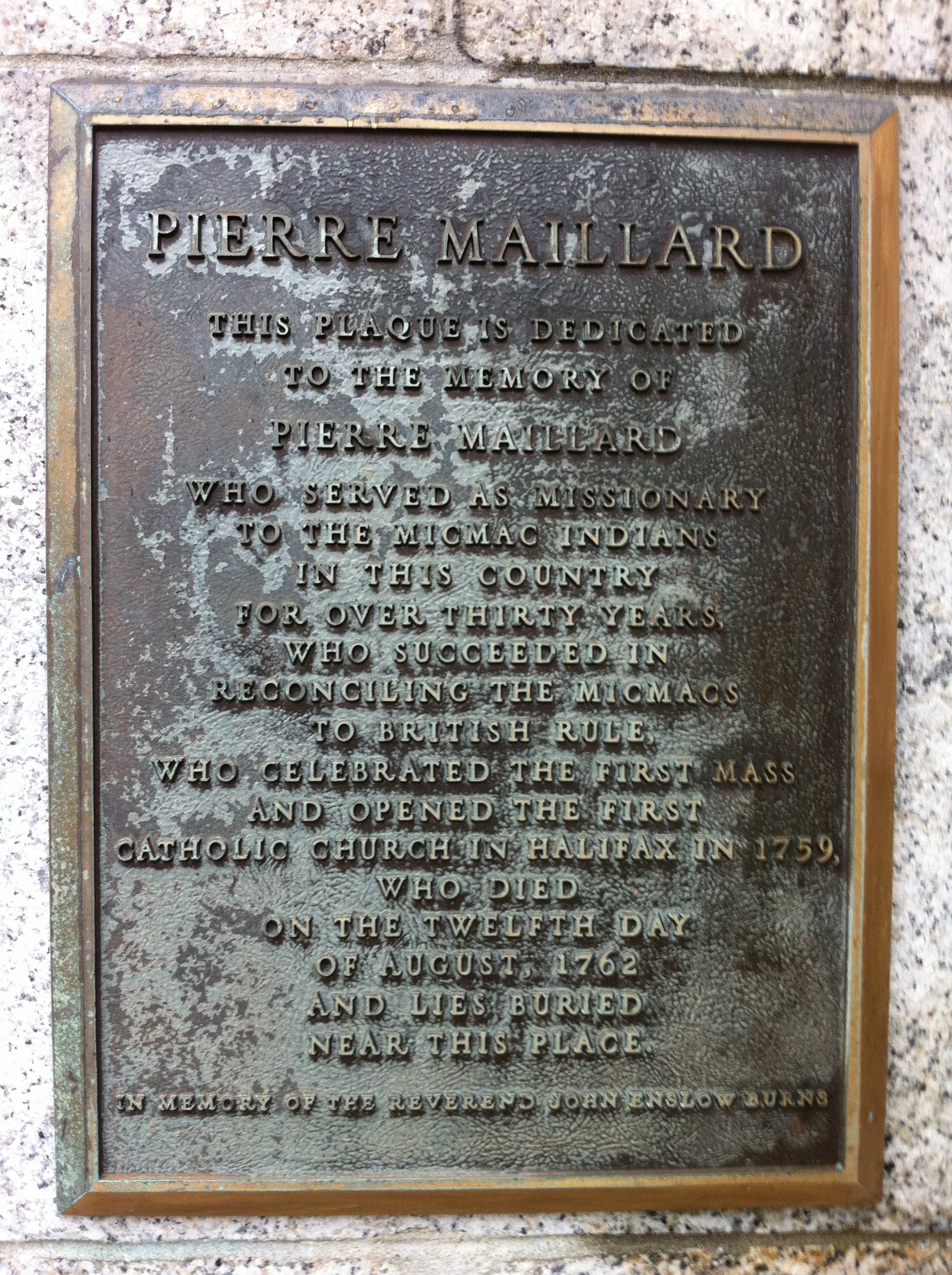
Pierre Maillard, Negotiator for the Miꞌkmaq, Plaque, St. Mary's Basilica (Halifax), Nova Scotia (He is reported to be buried on the grounds of St. Paul's Church (Halifax))

The Mi'kmaq signed a series of peace and friendship treaties with Great Britain. The first was after Father Rale's War (1725). The nation historically consisted of seven districts, which was later expanded to eight with the ceremonial addition of Great Britain at the time of the 1749 treaty.

Chief Jean-Baptiste Cope signed a Treaty of 1752 on behalf of the Shubenacadie Mi'kmaq. (Note: Historian William Wicken notes that there is controversy about this assertion. While there are claims that Cope made the treaty on behalf of all the Miꞌkmaq, there is no written documentation to support this assertion.(Wicken 2002, p. 184)) After agreeing to several peace treaties, the seventy-five year period of war ended with the Halifax Treaties between the British and the Miꞌkmaq (1760-1761). (In commemoration of these treaties, Nova Scotians annually celebrate Treaty Day on October 1.) Despite the treaties, the British continued to build fortifications in the province (see Fort Ellis and Fort Belcher).

Historian's differ on the meaning of the Treaties. Historian Stephen Patterson indicates that the Halifax Treaties established a lasting peace on the basis that the Mi'kmaq surrendered and chose to uphold the rule of law through the British courts rather than resorting to violence. Patterson reports that the Mi'kmaq were not in a position of military strength after the defeat of the French. He argues that without a supply of guns and ammunition, the Mi'kmaq lost their ability to fight and to hunt for food. As a result, the British were able to define themselves the terms of the Treaties. Patterson identifies the Halifax Treaties define the relationship between the Mi'kmaq and the British. While the Treaties do not stipulate the laws governing land and resources, the treaties ensured that both parties would follow the laws that would eventually be made to deal with these matters and any other matters. The British, accepted a continuing role for existing Miꞌkmaw polities within the limits of British sovereignty."

Historian John G. Reid dismisses the Treaties language about Mi'kmaq "submission" to the British crown, he believes that the Mi'kmaq intended a friendly and reciprocal relationship. He asserts his interpretation is based on what is known of the surrounding discussions, combined with the strong evidence of later Mi'kmaq statements. The Mi'kmaq leaders who represented their people in the Halifax negotiations in 1760 had clear goals: to make peace, establish secure and well-regulated trade in commodities such as furs, and begin an ongoing friendship with the British crown. In return, they offered their own friendship and a tolerance of limited British settlement, although without any formal land surrender. To fulfill the reciprocity intended by the Mi'kmaq, Ried argues that any additional British settlement of land would have to be negotiated, and accompanied by giving presents to the Mi'kmaq. (There was a long history of Europeans giving Mi'kmaq people presents to be accommodated on their land, starting with the first colonial contact.) The documents summarizing the peace agreements failed to establish specific territorial limits on the expansion of British settlements, but assured the Mi'kmaq of access to the natural resources that had long sustained them along the regions' coasts and in the woods. Their conceptions of land use were quite different. The Mi'kmaq believed they could share the land, with the British growing crops, and their people hunting as usual and getting to the coast for seafood.

=== American Revolution ===
As the New England Planters and United Empire Loyalists began to arrive in Mi'kmaki (the Maritimes) in greater numbers, economic, environmental and cultural pressures were put on the Mi'kmaq with the erosion of the intent of the treaties. The Mi'kmaq tried to enforce the treaties through threat of force. At the beginning of the American Revolution, many Mi'kmaq and Maliseet tribes were supportive of the Americans against the British. The Treaty of Watertown, the first foreign treaty concluded by the United States of America after the adoption of the Declaration of Independence, was signed on July 19, 1776, in the Edmund Fowle House in the town of Watertown, Massachusetts Bay. The treaty established a military alliance between the United States and the St. John's and Mi'kmaq First Nations in Nova Scotia—two of the peoples of the Wabanaki Confederacy—against Great Britain during the American Revolutionary War. (These Mi'kmaq delegates did not officially represent the Miꞌkmaw government, although many individual Mi'kmaq did privately join the Continental army as a result.)

Months after signing the treaty, they participated in the Maugerville Rebellion and the Battle of Fort Cumberland in November 1776.

During the St. John River expedition, Colonel Allan's untiring effort to gain the friendship and support of the Maliseet and Mi'kmaq for the Revolution was somewhat successful. There was a significant exodus of Maliseet from the St John River to join the American forces at Machias, Maine. On Sunday, 13 July 1777, a party of between 400 and 500 men, women, and children, embarked in 128 canoes from the Old Fort Meduetic (8 miles (13 km) below Woodstock) for Machias. The party arrived at a very opportune moment for the Americans, and afforded material assistance in the defence of that post during the attack made by Sir George Collier on 13–15 August. The British did only minimal damage to the place, and the services of the Indians on the occasion earned for them the thanks of the council of Massachusetts.

In June 1779, Mi'kmaq in the Miramichi attacked and plundered some of the British in the area. The following month, British Captain Augustus Harvey, in command of HMS Viper, arrived in the area and battled with the Mi'kmaq. One Mi'kmaq was killed and 16 were taken prisoner to Quebec. The prisoners were eventually brought to Halifax, where they were later released upon signing the Oath of Allegiance to the British Crown on 28 July 1779. (Note: Among the annual festivals of the old times, now lost sight of, was the celebration of St. Aspinquid's Day, known as the Indian Saint. St. Aspinquid appeared in the Nova Scotia almanacs from 1774 to 1786. The festival was celebrated on or immediately after the last quarter of the moon in the month of May. The tide being low at that time, many of the principal inhabitants of the town, on these occasions, assembled on the shore of the North West Arm and partook of a dish of clam soup, the clams being collected on the spot at low water. There is a tradition that during the American troubles when agents of the revolted colonies were active to gain over the good people of Halifax, in the year 1786, were celebrating St. Aspinquid, the wine having been circulated freely, the Union Jack was suddenly hauled down and replaced by the Stars and Stripes. This was soon reversed, but all those persons who held public offices immediately left the grounds, and St. Aspinquid was never after celebrated at Halifax.)

== 19th century ==
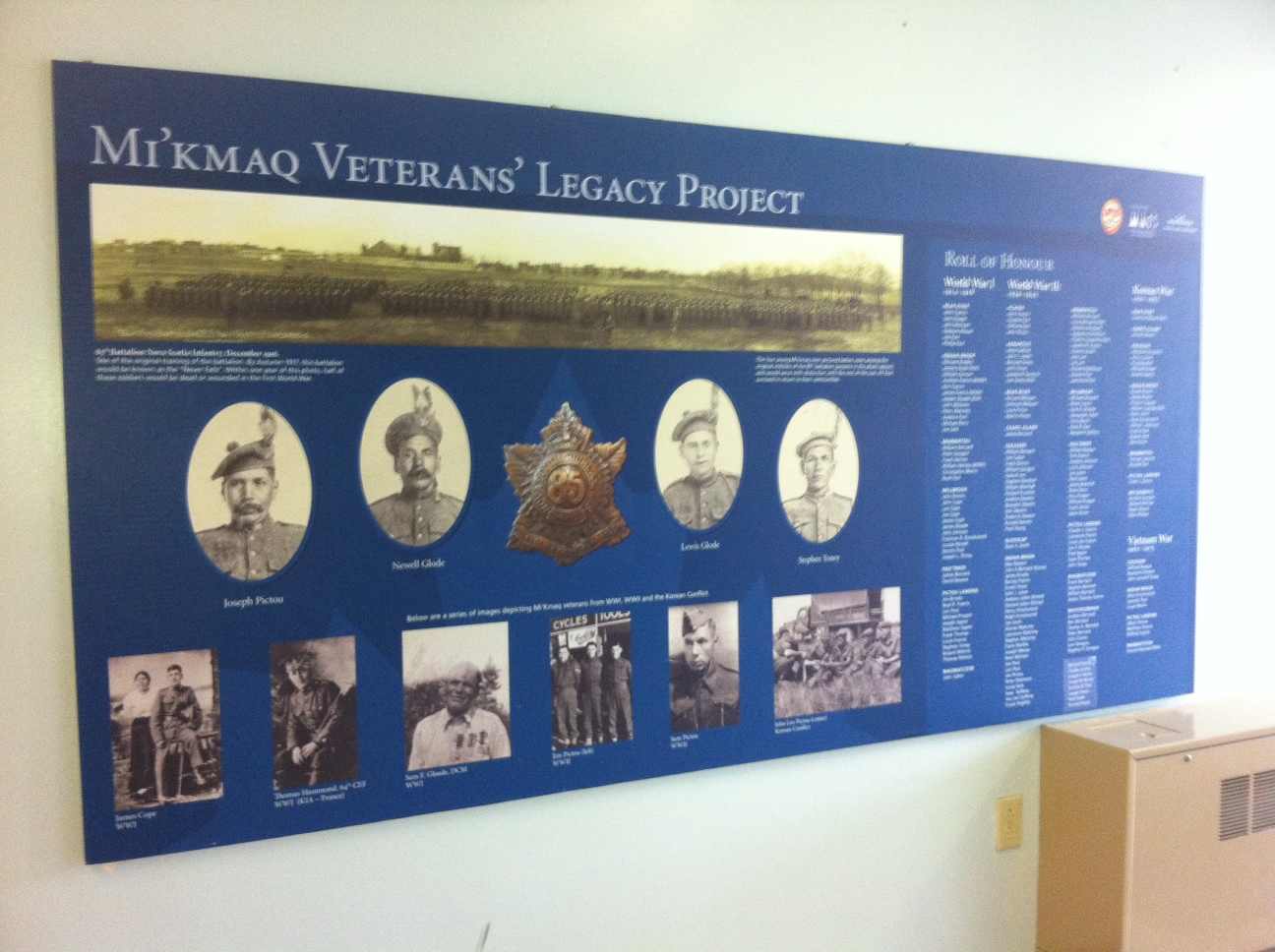
Mi'kmaq Veteran's Legacy Project, Headquarters, Nova Scotia Museum

As their military power waned in the beginning of the nineteenth century, the Mi'kmaq people made explicit appeals to the British to honour the treaties and reminded them of their duty to give "presents" (i.e., rent) to the Mi'kmaq in order to occupy Mi'kma'ki. In response, the British offered charity or, the word most often used by government officials, "relief". The British said the Mi'kmaq must give up their way of life and begin to settle on farms. Also, they were told they had to send their children to British schools (Residential Schools) for education.

== 20th century ==
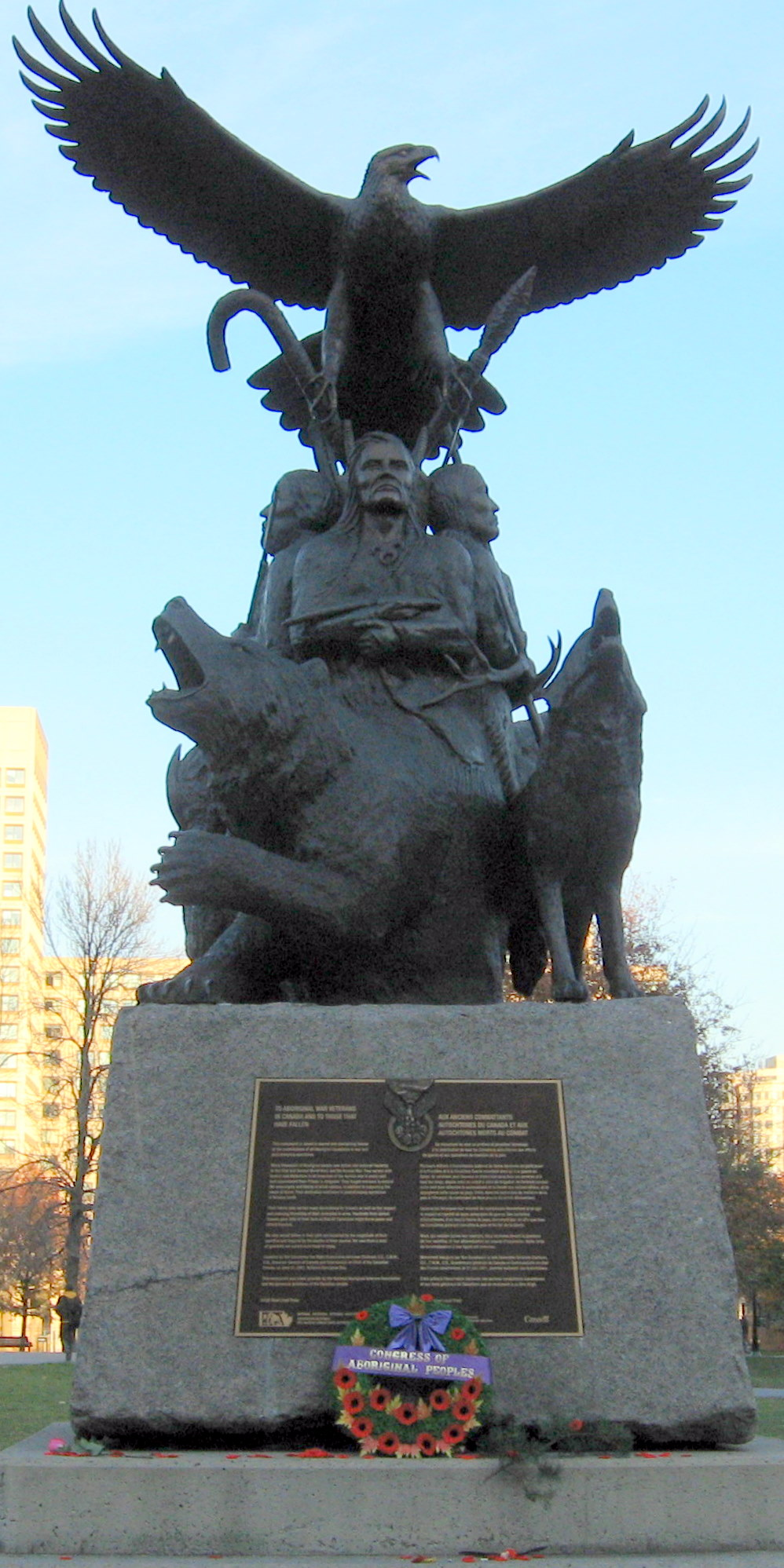
National Aboriginal Veterans Monument

In 1914, over 150 Mi'kmaq men signed up during World War I. During the war, thirty-four out of sixty-four male Mi'kmaq from Lennox Island First Nation, Prince Edward Island enlisted in the armed forces, distinguishing themselves particularly in the Battle of Amiens. On 11 March 1916, James Glode of Liverpool River became first Mi'kmaq to join the war. In 1939, World War II began and over 250 Miꞌkmaq volunteered. In 1950, over 60 Miꞌkmaq enlisted to serve in the Korean War.

The Treaties, which the Mi'kmaq militias fought for during the colonial period, did not gain legal status until they were enshrined into the Canadian Constitution in 1982. Every 1 October, "Treaty Day" is now celebrated by Nova Scotians.

== Notable veterans ==
- Jean-Baptiste Cope
- Paul Laurent
- Étienne Bâtard
- Indian Joe
- Sam Gloade (born April 20, 1878), World War I, awarded the Distinguished Conduct Medal, the British War Medal and the Victory Medal

== See also ==
- Military history of Nova Scotia
- Military history of the Maliseet
- Military history of the Acadians

== Links ==
- Mi'kmaq Veterans WWI and WWII
