= Jean-Baptiste Cope =

Mi'kmaq leader (1698–1758-60)

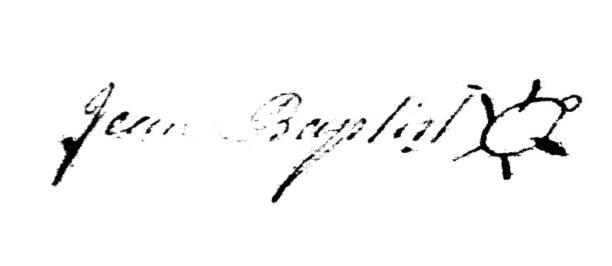
- Signature of Jean Baptiste Cope (Beaver)
- Born: 1698; Port Royal, Nova Scotia
- Died: October, 1758-1760; Miramichi, New Brunswick
- Military career
- Nickname: Major Cope
- Conflicts: Father Rale's War: Treaty of 1726; Father Le Loutre's War: Battle at Chignecto; Treaty of 1752; Attack at Isle Madame; French and Indian War: Battle of Beausejour; St. John River Campaign

Jean Baptiste Cope (Kopit in Mi’kmaq meaning ‘beaver’) was also known as Major Cope, a title he was probably given from the French military, the highest rank given to Mi’kmaq. Cope was the sakamaw (chief) of the Mi'kmaq people of Shubenacadie, Nova Scotia (Indian Brook 14, Nova Scotia/ Mi’kma'ki). He maintained close ties with the Acadians along the Bay of Fundy, speaking French and being Catholic. During Father Le Loutre’s War, Cope participated in both military efforts to resist the British and also efforts to create peace with the British. During the French and Indian War he was at Miramichi, New Brunswick, where he is presumed to have died during the war. Cope is perhaps best known for signing the Treaty of 1752 with the British, which was upheld in the Supreme Court of Canada in 1985 and is celebrated every year along with other treaties on Treaty Day (October 1).

== Father Rale's War ==
Cope was born in Port Royal and the oldest child of six. During Father Rale's War, at the young age of 28, Cope was probably one of a number of Mi’kmaq who signed the peace treaty, which ended the war between the New Englanders and the Mi’kmaq.

== King George’s War ==
During King George's War, Cope was a leader in the Shubenacadie region. There were between 50-150 Mi’kmaq families and a few Acadian farms in the river valley close to the principal Mi’kmaq village named Copequoy. The village had become the site of a Catholic mission in 1722. (The location became a site of two major annual events, All Saints Day and Pentecost, which attracted Mi’kmaq from great distances.)

Le Loutre took over the Shubenacadie mission in 1737. During King George’s War, Cope and Le Loutre worked together in several engagements against the British forces.

== Father Le Loutre’s War ==
At the outbreak of Father Le Loutre’s War, the Catholic missionary began to lead the Mi’kmaq and Acadian refugees out of peninsular Nova Scotia to settle in French-ruled territory. Dozens of Mi’kmaq from Shubenacadie accepted Le Loutre’s offer and followed him to the Isthmus of Chignecto. But Cope and at least ninety other Mi’kmaq refused to abandon their homes on the Shubenacadie. While Cope may have initially not supported the French initiatives, he would quickly reconsider after Edward Cornwallis established Halifax.

By unilaterally establishing Halifax, the Mi'kmaq believed that the British were violating earlier treaties signed in 1726. He tried to set up peace treaties, but failed. Cornwallis offered to New England Rangers a bounty for the scalps of Mi’kmaq families just as the French had offered a bounty to the Mi’kmaq for the scalps of British colonial families. According to historian Geoffery Plank, by this period, leaders of the conflict on both sides were gradually adopting an uncomplicated, racially based view of the war and their opponents. Several Mi'kmaq leaders and elders developed views mirroring those held by Cornwallis and other members of the Nova Scotia Council, namely that the conflict was a "race war", and both combatants were "singlemindedly" determined to drive each other from the peninsula of Nova Scotia.

After the establishment of Halifax, Cope seems to have joined Le Loutre at the Isthmus of Chignecto. Stationed in this region, through a series of raids, Cope and the other Mi’kmaq war leaders were able to confine the new settlers to the vicinity of Halifax. British plans to scatter Protestants across peninsular Nova Scotia were temporarily undermined.

=== Battle at Chignecto ===
After the Battle at Chignecto on September 3, 1750, Le Loutre and the French retreated to Beausejour ridge and Lawrence began to build Fort Lawrence on the former Acadian community of Beaubassin. Almost a month after the battle, on October 15, Cope, disguised in a French officer's uniform, approached the British under a white flag of truce and killed Captain Edward Howe. (Note: There has long been uncertainty among scholars as to the identity of the person who shot Howe until Plank (2001), p. 131, cited, "Looking back on the incident years later, Cope claimed credit for killing the British officer. Also see Murdoch (1866), p. 193.)

=== Peace treaty (1752) ===
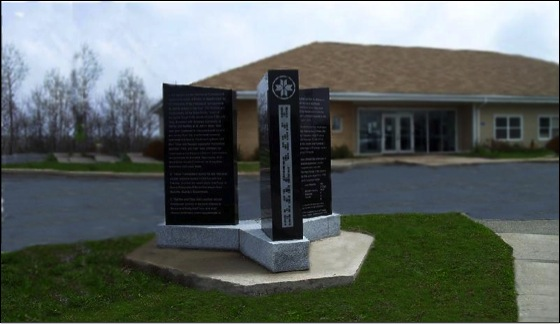
Monument to the Treaty of 1752, Sipekneꞌkatik First Nation, Nova Scotia

After eighteen months of inconclusive fighting, uncertainties and second thoughts began to disturb both the Mi’kmaq and the British communities. By the summer of 1751 Governor Cornwallis began a more conciliatory policy. For more than a year, Cornwallis sought out Mi’kmaq leaders willing to negotiate a peace. He eventually gave up, resigned his commission and left the colony.

With a new Governor in place, Governor Peregrine Hopson, the first and only willing Mi’kmaq negotiator to come forward and negotiate was Cope. On 22 November 1752, Cope finished negotiating a peace for the Mi’kmaq at Shubenacadie. (Note: Historian William Wicken (2002), pp. 183–189, notes that there is controversy about this assertion. While there are claims that Cope made the treaty on behalf of all the Mi'kmaq, there is no written documentation to support this assertion.) The basis of the treaty was the one signed in Boston which closed Father Rale's War (1725). (Note: For a detailed discussion of the treaty see Wicken (2002), pp. 183–189) Cope tried to get other Mi’kmaq chiefs in Nova Scotia to agree to the treaty but was unsuccessful. The Governor became suspicious of Cope’s actual leadership among the Mi’kmaq people. Of course, Le Loutre and the French were outraged at Cope’s decision to negotiate at all with the British.

=== Attack at Jeddore ===
In retaliation for the Attack at Country Harbour, on the night of April 21 (19 May), under the command of Major Cope, Mi'kmaq warriors attacked a diplomatic delegation made up of Captain Bannerman and his crew in the area of Jeddore, Nova Scotia. On board were nine British passengers and one Anthony Casteel, who was the pilot and spoke French. The Mi'kmaq killed the British passengers and let Casteel off at Port Toulouse, where the Mi'kmaq sank the schooner after looting it.

As the war continued, on 23 May 1753, Cope burned the peace treaty of 1752. The peace treaty signed by Cope and Hobson had not lasted six months. Shortly after, Cope joined Le Loutre again and worked to convince Acadians to join the exodus from peninsula Nova Scotia.

After the experience with Cope, the British were less willing to trust Mi’kmaq efforts for peace that followed over the next two years. Future peace treaties also failed because the Mi’kmaq proposals always included land claims, which the British presumed was tantamount to giving land to the French.

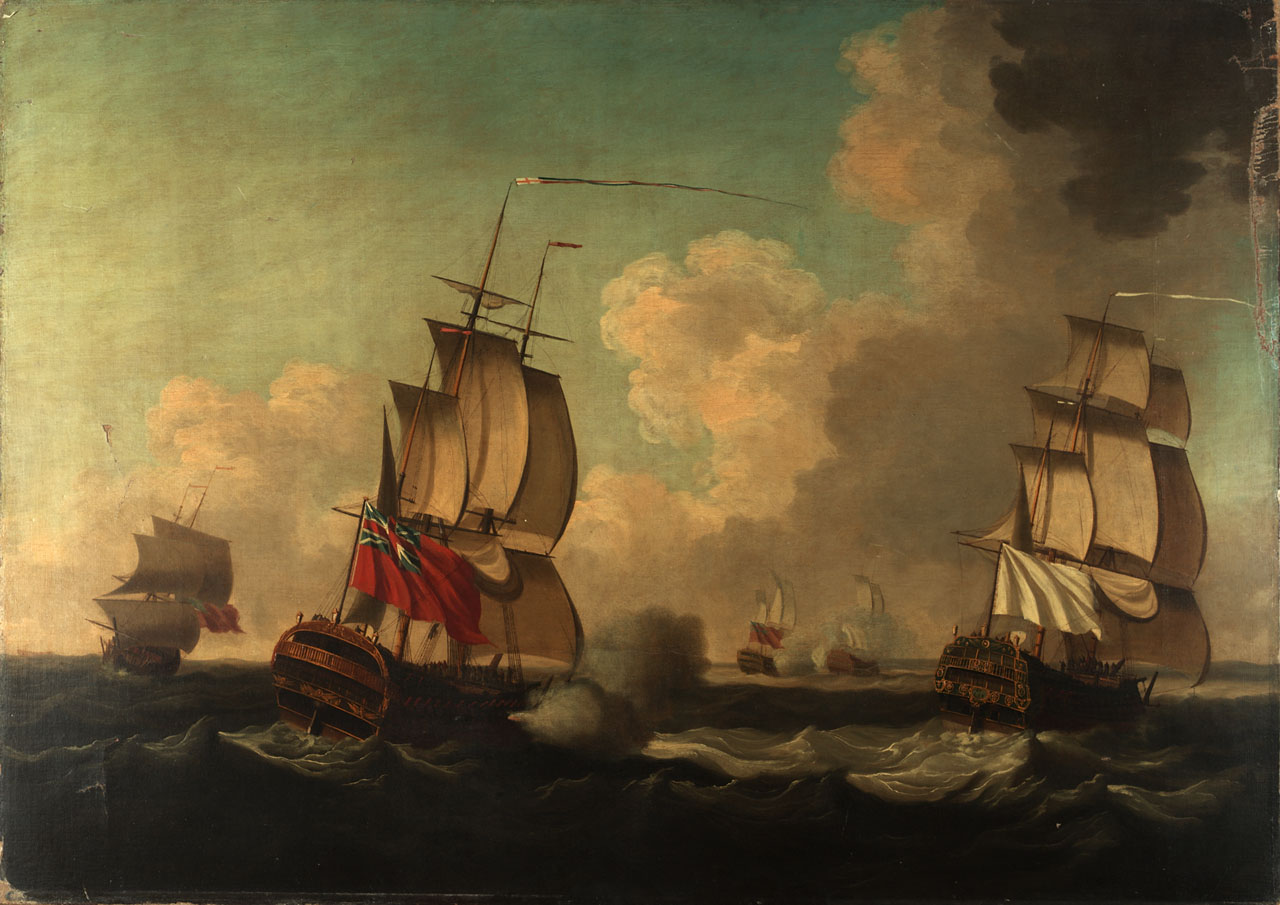
Capture of French ships Alcide and Lys off Newfoundland. The ships were carrying war supplies for Acadians and Mi'kmaq

In the action of 8 June 1755, a naval battle off Cape Race, Newfoundland, on board the French ships Alcide and Lys were found 10,000 scalping knives for Acadians and Indians serving under Chief Cope and Acadian Beausoleil as they continue to fight Father Le Loutre's War.

== French and Indian War ==
During the French and Indian War, Lawrence declared another bounty on scalps of male Mi’kmaq. Cope was probably among the Mi’kmaq and the Algonquian allies who helped Acadians evade capture during the St. John River Campaign. According to Louisbourg account books, from 1756 to 1758, the French made regular payments to Cope and other natives for British scalps. Cope is reported to have gone to Miramichi, New Brunswick, in the area where French Officer Boishebert had his refugee camp for Acadians escaping the deportation. He is likely to have died in the region before 1760.

=== Battle at St. Aspinquid's Chapel ===
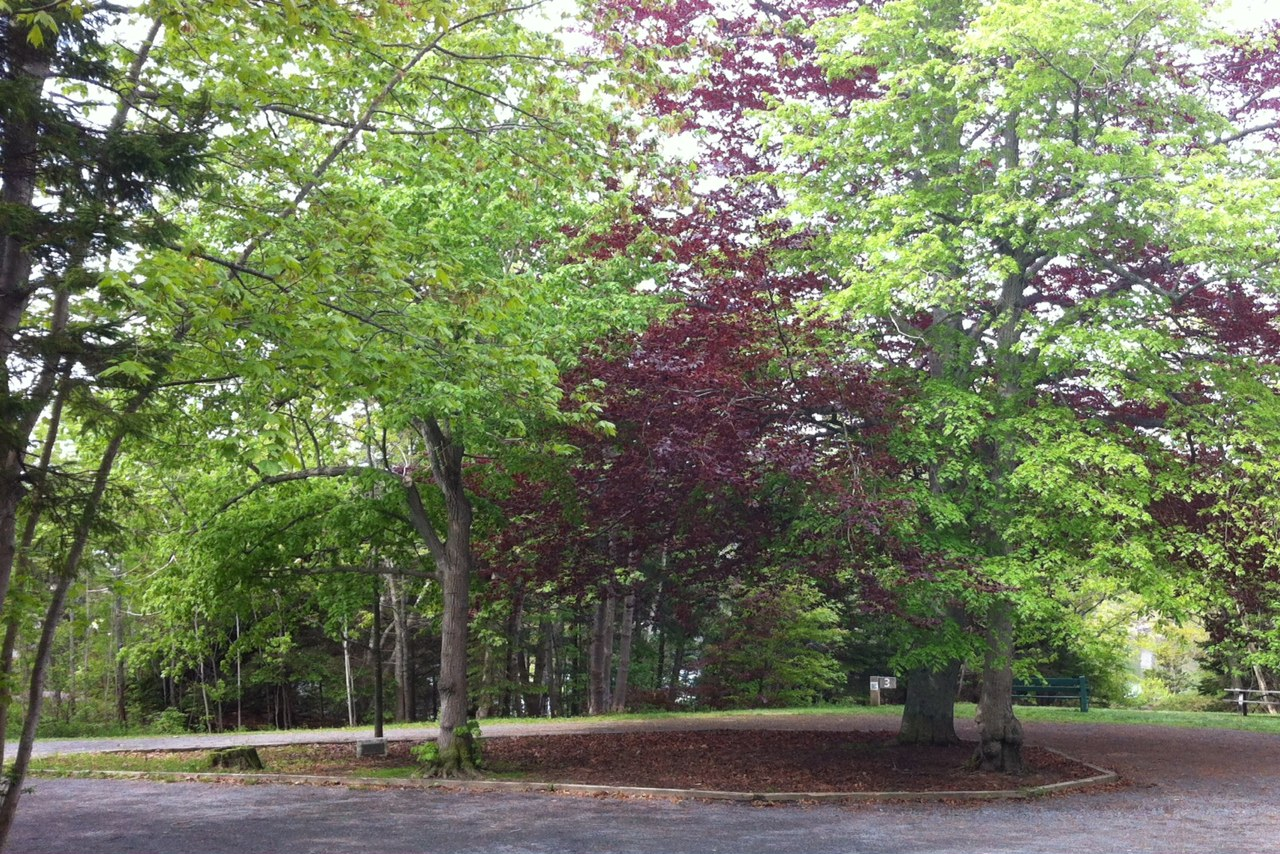
Cope's burial site, St. Aspinquid’s Chapel (Chain Rock Battery, Point Pleasant Park, Nova Scotia)

Tradition indicates that during the French and Indian War, Lahave Chief Paul Laurent and a party of eleven invited Shubenacadie Chief Jean-Baptiste Cope and five others to St. Aspinquid’s Chapel (in present-day Point Pleasant Park) to negotiate peace with the British. (Note: Awalt bases his account on stories from 17 separate Mi'kmaq accounts from 11 different locations in Nova Scotia, This oral tradition was also recorded by Harry Piers from elders who heard the story in the 19th century.) Chief Paul Laurent had just arrived in Halifax after surrendering to the British at Fort Cumberland on 29 February 1760. In early March 1760, the two parties met and engaged in armed conflict. (Note: None of the oral accounts give the exact date of the battle. Awalt is left to speculate about the date of the battle, which he asserts might be in May 1758 just before siege of Louisbourg. The evidence contradicts this assertion and suggests that the date was more likely March 1760. The two main players of the conflict - Paul Laurent and Jean-Baptiste Cope - both could not have been in Halifax in 1758 as indicated. Laurent was not seeking peace in 1758. Throughout the war Laurent fought the British and did not surrender until 29 February 1760 at Fort Cumberland. The only evidence of Chief Paul being in Halifax after 1755 is when he travels there over the following weeks to sign a peace treaty on March 10, 1760. Further, Cope could not have died before the Siege of Louisbourg because French Officer Chevalier de Johnstone indicated that he saw Cope at Miramichi after the Siege of Louisbourg when Johnstone was en route to Quebec.) Chief Larent's party killed Cope and two others, while Chief Cope’s party killed five of the British supporters. Shortly after Cope's death, Mi'kmaq chiefs signed a peace treaty in Halifax on 10 March 1760. Chief Laurent signed on behalf of the Lahave tribe and a new chief, Claude Rene, signed on behalf of the Shubenacadie tribe. (Note: Daniel N. Paul erroneously asserts that "the record shows Cope was still alive in the 1760s, which indicates he may have lived to a ripe old age". The last record of Cope is by Johnstone in 1758. The Chief of the Shebenacadie was replaced in 1760, indicating that Cope was dead.) (Note: Paul Laurent's biographer Michael Johnston notes that another chief from La Heve signed another treaty with the English on 9 Nov. 1761.) (During this time of surrender and treaty making, tensions among the various factions who were allied against the British were evident. For example, a few months after the death of Cope, the Mi'kmaq militia and Acadian militias made the rare decisions to continue to fight despite losing the support of the French priests who were encouraging surrender.) (Note: Chief Joseph Labrador of Lunenburg supported Chief Cope. He survived the battle and continued his raids on British settlers.)

== Legacy ==
After the treaty of 1752, while the conflict continued, the British never returned to their old policy of driving the Mi’kmaq off the peninsula. The treaty signed by Cope and Governor Hobson was upheld in 1985 Supreme Court. Currently there is a monument to the Peace Treaty on the Shubenacadie Reserve (Indian Brook 14, Nova Scotia). The descendants of Cope gave Cope's gun to the Citadel Hill (Fort George) museum of Parks Canada.

Author Thomas Raddall wrote about Cope in his novel Roger Sudden.

== See also ==
- Military history of Nova Scotia
- Military history of the Mi’kmaq people

== Sources ==
=== Primary sources ===
- "Anthony Casteel's Journal". Collection de documents inédits sur le Canada et l'Amérique (Tome Deuxieme ed.). Quebec: L.-J. Demers et Freres. 1889. pp. 111-126. ISBN 978-0-665-05323-8.

=== Secondary sources ===
- Faragher, John Mack (2005). A Great and Noble Scheme: The Tragic Story of the Expulsion of the French Acadians from Their American Homeland. W.W Norton & Company. ISBN 978-0-393-05135-3.
- Johnson, Micheline D. (1974). "Cope, Jean-Baptiste". In Halpenny, Francess G. (ed.). Dictionary of Canadian Biography. Vol. III (1741–1770) (online ed.). University of Toronto Press.
- Murdoch, Beamish (1866). A History of Nova-Scotia, Or Acadie. Vol. II. Halifax: J. Barnes.
- Plank, Geoffrey (Spring 1996). "The Two Majors Cope: the boundaries of Nationality in Mid-18th Century Nova Scotia". Acadiensis. 25 (2): 18–40. JSTOR 30302888.
- Plank, Geoffrey (2001). An Unsettled Conquest: The British Campaign Against the Peoples of Acadia. University of Pennsylvania Press. ISBN 978-0-8122-0710-1.
- Whitehead, Ruth Holmes (1991). The Old Man Told Us: Excerpts from Micmac History, 1500-1950. Nimbus. ISBN 978-0-921054-83-2.
- Wicken, William C. (2002). Mi'kmaq Treaties on Trial: History, Land and Donald Marshall Junior. University of Toronto Press. ISBN 978-0-8020-7665-6.
