= What Strange Paradise =

2021 novel by Omar El Akkad

- First edition cover (publ. Penguin Random House)
- Author: Omar El Akkad
- Publication date: August 19, 2021
- ISBN: 9781529069501

What Strange Paradise is a novel by Canadian writer Omar El Akkad, published in 2021 by Penguin Random House. The novel centres on Amir, a young boy from Syria who has survived the sinking of a ship that was carrying him and other refugees, and his developing bond with Vänna, a teenage girl who resides on the island where Amir washed up after the shipwreck.

The novel won the 2021 Giller Prize.

== Reception ==
Writing for The New York Times Wendell Steavenson described how, "This extraordinary book carries a message, not of a trite and clichéd hope, but of a greater universal humanism, the terrifying idea that, ultimately, there are no special distinctions among us, that in fact we are all very much in the same boat." Ron Charles of The Washington Post called the novel "riveting" and noted that, "Nothing I’ve read before has given me such a visceral sense of the grisly predicament confronted by millions of people expelled from their homes by conflict and climate change." Similarly, Robert J. Wiersema writing for the magazine Quill & Quire said "What Strange Paradise is an immediate, visceral reading experience. El Akkad offers no easy answers, save the reminder of our common humanity and the importance of the simplicity of right and wrong. And that is, truly, more than enough." The Guardian's Sukhdev Sandhu specifically pointed to how "El Akkad’s vignettes of life at sea are especially textured." The reviewer concluded, "There are many passages in What Strange Paradise that startle and are hard to forget."

What Strange Paradise was shortlisted for the 2022 Aspen Words Literary Prize. It was also selected for the 2022 edition of Canada Reads, where it was defended by entrepreneur Tareq Hadhad.
