= St. Aspinquid's Chapel =

Historic church in Halifax, Nova Scotia

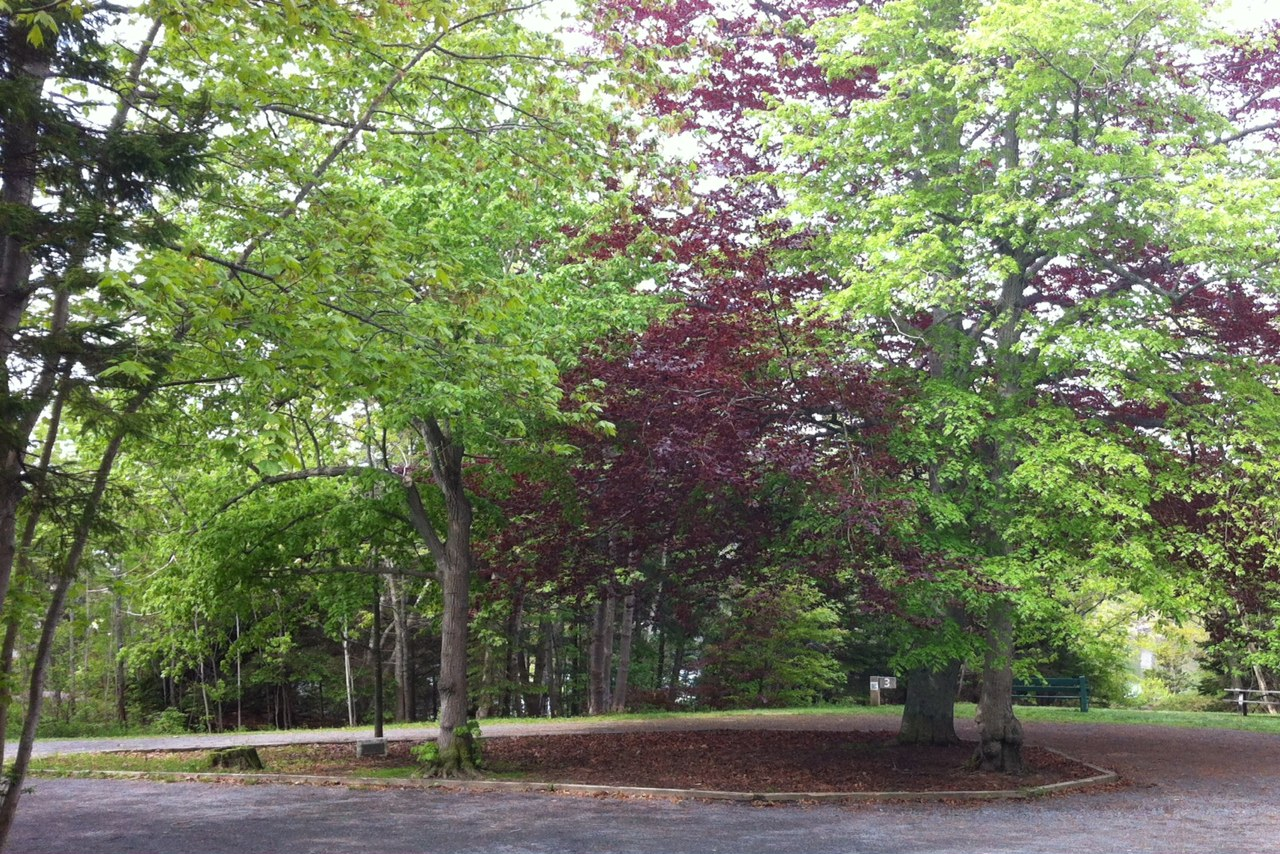
St. Aspinquid Chapel (Chain Rock Battery, Point Pleasant Park, Nova Scotia)

St. Aspinquid's Chapel was established by Priest Louis-Pierre Thury at Chebucto (present day Halifax, Nova Scotia) in the late 17th century. The chapel is a natural stone amphitheatre located by Chain Rock Battery on the Northwest Arm at Point Pleasant Park. There are numerous notable people interred in the burial grounds around the chapel and it is also the location of the Mi’kmaq celebration of the Feast of St. Aspinquid (St. Aspinquid's Day), which was conducted through much of the 18th century. During the French and Indian War two Mi'kmaw chiefs fought each other in a battle near the chapel (1760).

== St. Aspinquid ==
Tradition indicates Thury named the chapel after a Mi’kmaq Chief Aspinquid (Aspenquid), who converted to Catholicism and drew many others into the faith. Thury arrived at Acadia in 1684 and travelled with St. Aspinquid throughout the region, including present-day Nova Scotia. (During much of the 17th and early 18th centuries, Norridgewock on the Kennebec River and Castine at the end of the Penobscot River were the southernmost settlements of Acadia.)

Chief Aspinquid was the "Chief Sacham of all the Tribes of Indians in the Northern District of North America." During King William's War he was also a political figure who signed a treaty with Massachusetts Governor William Phips on August 11, 1693. Captain Pasco Chubb murdered Chief Aspinquid at Pemaquid in February 1696. Thury, a Mi'kmaq militia and others of the Wabanaki Confederacy exacted revenge a few months later in the Siege of Pemaquid (1696). As a result, Aspinquid was made a martyr and became a saint. He is buried at Mount Agamenticus in present-day Maine.

After the death of St. Aspinquid, Father Louis-Pierre Thury officially became the missionary to the Mi'kmaq people at Shubenacadie and Chibouctou (Halifax) (1698). Thury was the first missionary assigned to Halifax.

== Feast of St. Aspinquid ==
Tradition indicates Thury celebrated Easter with the Mi'kmaq to coincide with their ancient spring festival. He renamed the Old Spring Feast the Feast of St. Aspinquid. Historically the feast was the great social event of the year in the Mi’kmaq community, attracting various tribes of different native groups from all over the northeast region. The festival was celebrated on or immediately after the first quarter of the moon in the month of May. Throughout Father Le Loutre's War the feast is reported to have ceased until after the Burying of the Hatchet Ceremony (1761). Oral tradition indicates Michael Francklin convinced the Mi’kmaq to continue their tradition at St. Aspinquid's Chapel.

But in 1786, evidence of Mi’kmaq support for patriots in the American Revolution alarmed the local authorities and further celebration of the old feast was forbidden.

== Battle at St. Aspinquid's Chapel ==
Tradition indicates that at St. Aspinquid's Chapel in Point Pleasant Park, Halifax, Lahave Chief Paul Laurent and a party of eleven invited Shubenacadie Chief Jean-Baptiste Cope and five others to St. Aspinquid's Chapel to negotiate peace with the British. Chief Paul Laurent had just arrived in Halifax after surrendering to the British at Fort Cumberland on 29 February 1760. In early March 1760, the two parties met and engaged in armed conflict. Chief Larent's party killed Cope and two others, while Chief Cope's party killed five of the British supporters.

Shortly after Cope's death, Mi'kmaq chiefs signed a peace treaty in Halifax on 10 March 1760. Chief Laurent signed on behalf of the Lahave tribe and a new chief, Claude Rene, signed on behalf of the Shubenacadie tribe. (During this time of surrender and treaty making, tensions among the various factions who were allied against the British were evident. For example, a few months after the death of Cope, the Mi'kmaq militia and Acadian militias made the rare decisions to continue to fight in the Battle of Restigouche despite losing the support of the French priests who were encouraging surrender.)

== Burial ground ==
Some of the notable people interred in the burial ground are Thury (3 June 1699), the first recorded burial in Halifax; Shubenacadie Chief Jean Baptiste Cope (1760); and Halifax Chief Paul the last Mi’kmaq chief of the Chebucto tribe. The Duc d'Anville Expedition arrived with the crew dying of typhus, which spread to and devastated the Mi’kmaq who were at Chebucto, many of whom are interred at the burial ground (1746).

== Links ==
- Early newspaper texts related to St. Aspinuid, Nova Scotia
- Halifax Gazette, 1770. Journalism of Nova Scotia. Collections of the Nova Scotia Historical Society, Volume 6, pp. 116–117
