= One Day, Everyone Will Have Always Been Against This =

2025 non-fiction book by Omar El Akkad

- Author: Omar El Akkad
- Language: English
- Published: 25 February 2025
- Publisher: Knopf
- Publication place: Canada
- Pages: 208
- ISBN: 9780593804148

One Day, Everyone Will Have Always Been Against This is a 2025 non-fiction book by Egyptian-Canadian-American author Omar El Akkad that won the 2025 National Book Award for Nonfiction. Although its title refers to the Gaza genocide, El Akkad's book includes wide-ranging critique of Western imperialism and hypocrisy. The book was received positively by most reviewers.

== Background ==
Omar El Akkad	Twitter
@omarelakkad

One day, when it's safe, when there's no personal downside to calling a thing what it is, when it's too late to hold anyone accountable, everyone will have always been against this.

25 Oct 2023

Muhammad Smiry	Twitter
@MuhammadSmiry

This is Gaza.

25 Oct 2023

El Akkad is a novelist and journalist. His novels have won multiple literary awards, and he wrote for publications including The Globe and Mail. The book's title is from a viral tweet that El Akkad posted in October 2023 referring to the Gaza genocide.

== Content ==
Besides the Gaza war, El Akkad takes aim at Western imperialism. The book is partly about what El Akkad called "the gap between [the West's] lofty ideals and its bloodstained reality"; he feels deeply disillusioned after adhering to what he thought of as Western ideas of freedom and seeing them betrayed. He points out the hypocrisy of holding the United States and Israel to a different standard than their enemies.

El Akkad contrasts the situation of people in Gaza with that of observers in the West, comparing images of horrendous slaughter of children with the author's own children playing far away from a war zone. His book is primarily aimed at centrists and liberals in the West who have not spoken out against the Gaza war.

== Reception ==
Dina Nayeri, writing for The Guardian, called the book "passionate, poetic and sickening", and "full of well-earned rage".

According to Joe Stanek in the Chicago Review of Books, El Akkad's use of the future tense gives the book the impression of prophecy, and the book "shines with quotable critique that spares no one from scrutiny". +972 Magazine published a review by Amir Rotem that highlighted several examples of Western inconsistencies brought up in El Akkad's book, including how violent resistance by indigenous people is only ever celebrated after it fails. In Dissent, Avram Alpert found that the book relentlessly exposed the moral limitations of the contemporary world and showed how difficult—and yet necessary—transformation remains.

Brian Tanguay in the California Review of Books calls it a "brave book" and a "scathing polemic exposing the moral shortcomings of the Western world order". He compares the book to James Baldwin's The Fire Next Time. Unlike El Akkad, Tanguay is skeptical that people would act when confronted with grave injustices. Fintan O'Toole in the New York Times Book Review called it "a distraught but eloquent cry against our tolerance for other people's calamities".

David Mikics, a professor of English at New College of Florida writing in Tablet, said, "In a sane culture, Omar El Akkad's book would be dismissed as a crackpot hate-monger's one-sided diatribe."

== Awards ==
The book won the 2025 National Book Awards prize for non-fiction.
