= Paul Laurent =

Native American tribal leader

Paul Laurent was a Chief of the La Have Mi’kmaq tribe. He was aligned with Father Le Loutre throughout Father Le Loutre’s War. The British killed his father when he was younger, which he tried to avenge by killing one of Jean-Baptiste Cope’s prisoners.

== Peace Proposal (1754) ==
He also sought to support Le Loutre, John Hamilton, and Mi’kmaq attempts to have the British acknowledge their land claims early in 1755. When this initiative was rejected and Fort Beausejour fell, Laurent joined Father Manach and Charles Deschamps de Boishébert’s armed resistance against the British.

== Battle at St. Aspinquid's Chapel ==
Tradition indicates that during the French and Indian War, Lahave Chief Paul Laurent and a party of eleven invited Shubenacadie Chief Jean-Baptiste Cope and five others to St. Aspinquid’s Chapel in present-day Point Pleasant Park to negotiate peace with the British. Chief Paul Laurent had just arrived in Halifax after surrendering to the British at Fort Cumberland on 29 February 1760. In early March 1760, the two parties met and engaged in armed conflict. Chief Paul Larent's party killed Cope and two others. Chief Cope’s party killed five of the British supporters. Shortly after Cope's death, Mi'kmaq chiefs signed a peace treaty in Halifax on 10 March 1760. Chief Paul Laurent signed on behalf of the Lahave tribe and a new chief, Claude Rene, signed on behalf of the Shubenacadie tribe. (During this time of surrender and treaty making, tensions among the various factions who fought the British were evident. For example, a few months after the death of Cope, the Mi'kmaq militia and Acadian militias made the rare decisions to continue to fight despite losing the support of the French priests who were encouraging surrender.)

== See also ==
- Military history of the Mi’kmaq people
