= Omar El Akkad =

Egyptian-Canadian-American novelist and journalist (born 1982)

- عمر العقاد
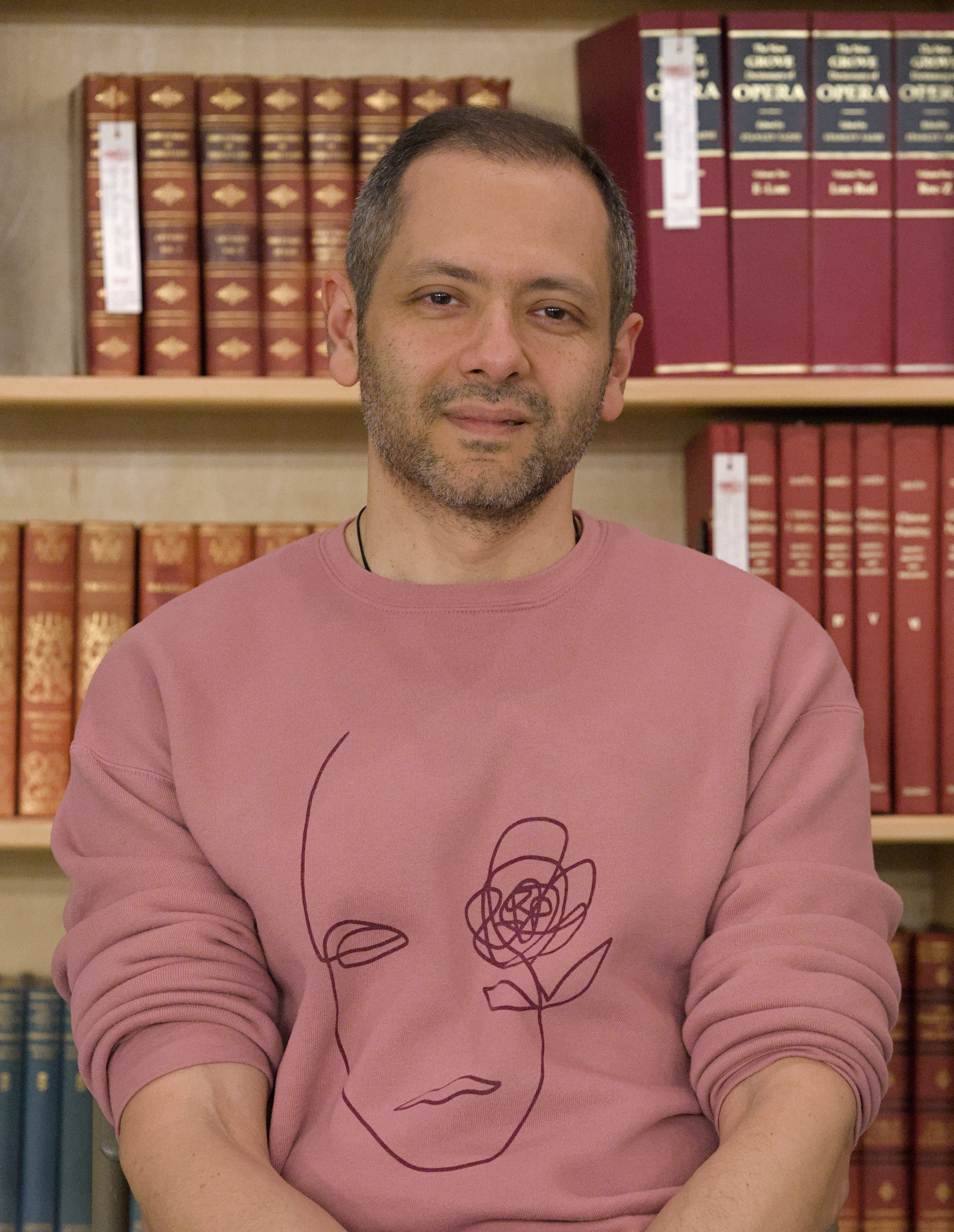
- El Akkad in 2025
- Born: 1982 (age 43–44); Cairo, Egypt
- Education: Queen's University at Kingston
- Occupations: Novelist; journalist
- Notable work: American War; What Strange Paradise; One Day, Everyone Will Have Always Been Against This
- Awards: Scotiabank Giller Prize (2021); National Book Award for Nonfiction (2025)

Omar El Akkad (Arabic: عمر العقاد, romanized: ʿUmar al-ʿAqqād; born 1982) is an Egyptian-Canadian novelist and journalist. A former staff reporter for The Globe and Mail, he is the author of the novels American War (2017) and What Strange Paradise (2021), and of the nonfiction book One Day, Everyone Will Have Always Been Against This (2025). What Strange Paradise won the 2021 Scotiabank Giller Prize, and One Day, Everyone Will Have Always Been Against This won the 2025 National Book Award for Nonfiction.

== Early life and education ==
El Akkad was born in Cairo and grew up in, Doha, Qatar. He moved to Montreal as a teenager with his family. He studied computer science at Queen's University at Kingston, where he worked at the student newspaper The Queen's Journal.

== Career ==
El Akkad worked for about a decade as a staff reporter for The Globe and Mail, after first completing a summer internship at their Toronto office. His reporting included the war in Afghanistan, military proceedings at Guantanamo Bay, and the Arab Spring in Egypt. He later covered the Black Lives Matter movement in Ferguson, Missouri. His journalism received a National Newspaper Award for investigative reporting and the Goff Penny Memorial Prize for young Canadian journalists.

His debut novel, American War, was published in 2017. The novel won the Rakuten Kobo Emerging Writer Prize and the Oregon Book Award for fiction, and it was shortlisted for the 2017 Atwood Gibson Writers' Trust Fiction Prize. In 2019, the BBC included American War on its list of 100 novels that shaped the world.

His second novel, What Strange Paradise, was published in 2021. It won the 2021 Giller Prize, the 2022 Oregon Book Award for fiction, and a 2022 Pacific Northwest Book Award.

In 2025, El Akkad published his first nonfiction book, One Day, Everyone Will Have Always Been Against This. The book won the 2025 National Book Award for Nonfiction.

El Akkad's books have been translated into 13 languages.

== Personal life ==
In a 2017 essay for The Guardian, El Akkad wrote about being Arab and Muslim in the U.S. He lives in Portland, Oregon.

== Bibliography ==
- American War
  - U.S.: Knopf, 2017. ISBN 9780451493583.
  - Canada: McClelland & Stewart, 2018. ISBN 9780771009419.
- What Strange Paradise
  - U.S.: Vintage Books, 2022. ISBN 9781984899248.
  - Canada: McClelland & Stewart, 2022. ISBN 9780771050329.
- One Day, Everyone Will Have Always Been Against This
  - U.S.: Knopf, 2025. ISBN 9780593804148.
  - Canada: McClelland & Stewart, 2025. ISBN 9780771021787.
