= Jon Tattrie =

Canadian writer and journalist

Jon Tattrie is a Canadian writer and journalist from Nova Scotia. Tattrie is the author of eight books, including Peace by Chocolate: The Hadhad Family's Remarkable Journey From Syria to Canada (2020) covering the Hadhad family and their chocolate company, Peace by Chocolate. Tattrie's articles have been published in a variety of publications in Canada such as Canadian Geographic, The Globe and Mail and CBC News.

== Biography ==
After graduating from Dalhousie University in Halifax, Nova Scotia, Tattrie travelled to Edinburgh, Scotland in 1999 where he befriended a freelance journalist, inspiring him to attend Telford College in Edinburgh where he earned a journalism diploma. After moving back to Halifax in 2006, Tattrie worked for The Daily News until the newspaper ceased publication in 2008. He then began freelance writing as a method of earning an income, contributing to publications such as East Coast Living and Halifax Magazine. He released his first book, Black Snow: A Story of Love and Destruction in 2009, followed by The Hermit of Africville: The Life of Eddie Carvery in 2010, a non-fiction book concerning Eddie Carvery; and Cornwallis: The Violent Birth of Halifax in 2013, a non-fiction book concerning Edward Cornwallis. Tattrie's 2020 book Peace by Chocolate: The Hadhad Family's Remarkable Journey From Syria to Canada covered the Hadhad family, who migrated to from Syria to Nova Scotia from 2015 to 2016 and started the chocolate company Peace by Chocolate. Tattrie's book was generally well-received for its account of the family's story.

As a journalist, Tattrie has written for several publications in Canada such as Canadian Geographic, The Globe and Mail, CBC News, and others.

== Publications ==
- Tattrie, Jon (2009). Black Snow: A Story of Love and Destruction. Lawrencetown Beach, NS: Pottersfield Press. ISBN 978-1-8974-2605-0.
- — (2010). The Hermit of Africville: The Life of Eddie Carvery. Lawrencetown Beach, NS: Pottersfield Press. ISBN 978-1-9897-2535-1.
- — (2013). Cornwallis: The Violent Birth of Halifax. Lawrencetown Beach, NS: Pottersfield Press. ISBN 978-1-8974-2648-7.
- — (2014). Day Trips From Halifax: The Ultimate Halifax Daytripper's Guide. Lunenburg, NS: MacIntyre Purcell Publishing. ISBN 978-1-9270-9744-1.
- — (2015). Limerence. Lawrencetown Beach, NS: Pottersfield Press. ISBN 978-1-8974-2673-9.
- — (2016). Redemption Songs: How Bob Marley's Nova Scotia Song Lights the way Past Racism. Lawrencetown Beach, NS: Pottersfield Press. ISBN 978-1-8974-2687-6.
- — (2017). Daniel Paul: Mi'kmaw Elder. Lawrencetown Beach, NS: Pottersfield Press. ISBN 978-1-9882-8604-4.
- — (2020). Peace by Chocolate: The Hadhad Family's Remarkable Journey From Syria to Canada. Fredericton, NB: Goose Lane Editions. ISBN 978-1-7731-0189-7.
- — (2026). To Leave a Warrior Behind. Toronto: McClelland & Stewart. ISBN 978-0-7710-0421-6.
