= Edward How =

Edward How may refer to:

- Edward How (military officer) (c. 1702–1750), British officer, diplomat and member of the Nova Scotia Council
- Edward How (priest), Anglican archdeacon in Ireland
- Edward How (cricketer) (1974–2012), English cricketer, banker and educator
