= Battle at Chignecto =

1750 battle

- Part of Father Le Loutre's War
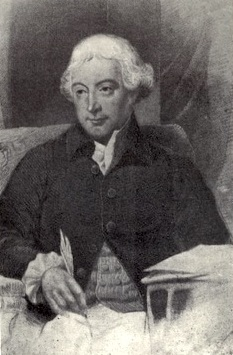
- Charles Lawrence
Date	September 3, 1750
Location	Chignecto, Nova Scotia 45.916639°N 64.165806°W
Result	British victory

Belligerents
Mi'kmaq militia Acadian militia	(Kingdom of Great Britain) Great Britain; British America

Commanders and leaders
Jean-Louis Le Loutre; Louis de La Corne; Louis Le Neuf de la Valiere; Joseph Broussard (Beausoliel); Chief Étienne Bâtard; Father Charles Germain	Charles Lawrence; John Gorham; Captain John Rous; Silvanus Cobb; Horatio Gates; Captain William Clapham; Colonel Peregrine Lascelles; John Salusbury; Hugh Warburton; Joseph Gorham; Joshua Winslow; John Brewse (wounded); Captain William Rickson; Francis Bartelo †; Henry Grace (POW)

Strength
300 Mi'kmaq and Acadian militia	700 British regulars and New England Rangers

Casualties and losses
7-8 Mi'kmaq	20 killed; 3 killed, 12 missing

The Battle at Chignecto happened during Father Le Loutre's War when Charles Lawrence, in command of the 45th Regiment of Foot (Hugh Warburton's regiment) and the 47th Regiment (Peregrine Lascelles' regiment), John Gorham in command of the Rangers and Captain John Rous in command of the navy, fought against the French monarchists at Chignecto. This battle was the first attempt by the British to occupy the head of the Bay of Fundy since the disastrous Battle of Grand Pré three years earlier. They fought against a militia made up of Mi'kmaq and Acadians led by Jean-Louis Le Loutre and Joseph Broussard (Beausoliel). The battle happened at Isthmus of Chignecto, Nova Scotia on 3 September 1750.

== Background ==
Despite the British conquest of Acadia in 1710, Nova Scotia remained primarily occupied by Catholic Acadians and Mi'kmaq. By the time Cornwallis had arrived in Halifax, there was a long history of the Wabanaki Confederacy (which included the Mi'kmaq) launching raids on British colonial settlements along the New England/ Acadia border in Maine (See the Northeast Coast Campaigns 1688, 1703, 1723, 1724, 1745, 1746, 1747).

To prevent the establishment of British colonial settlements in the region, Mi'kmaq launched raids on present-day Shelburne (1715) and Canso (1720). A generation later, Father Le Loutre's War began when Edward Cornwallis arrived to establish Halifax with 13 transports on June 21, 1749.

Within 18 months of establishing Halifax, the British also took firm control of peninsula Nova Scotia by building fortifications in all the major Acadian communities: present-day Windsor (Fort Edward); Grand Pre (Fort Vieux Logis) and Chignecto (Fort Lawrence). (A British fort already existed at the other major Acadian centre of Annapolis Royal, Nova Scotia. Cobequid remained without a fort.) After the raid in Dartmouth in 1749, on October 2, 1749, Cornwallis created an extirpation proclamation to stop the raids. The Siege of Grand Pre was the first recorded conflict in the region after the raid on Dartmouth.

== Battle ==
On 23 April, Lawrence was unsuccessful in getting a base at Chignecto because Le Loutre led 70 Mi'kmaq and 30 Acadians in burning the village of Beaubassin, preventing Lawrence from using its supplies to establish a fort. (According to the historian Frank Patterson, the Acadians at Cobequid also burned their homes as they retreated from the British to Tatamagouche, Nova Scotia in 1754.) Lawrence retreated, but he returned in September 1750.

On September 3, 1750 Captain John Rous, Lawrence and Gorham led over 700 men (including the 40th, 45th and 47th Regiments) to Chignecto, where Mi'kmaq and Acadians opposed their landing. They had thrown up a breastwork from behind which they opposed the landing. They killed twenty British, who in turn killed several Mi'kmaq. The Mi'kmaq and Acadians killed Captain Francis Bartelo in the Battle at Chignecto. Le Loutre's militia eventually withdrew to Beausejour, burning the rest of the Acadians' crops and houses as they went.

== Aftermath ==
On 15 October (N.S.) a group of Micmacs disguised as French officers called a member of the Nova Scotia Council Edward How to a conference. This trap, organized by Étienne Bâtard, gave him the opportunity to wound How seriously, and How died five or six days later, according to Captain La Vallière (probably Louis Leneuf de La Vallière), the only eye-witness. After the battle, the British built Fort Lawrence at Chignecto and the Mi'kmaq people and Acadians continued with numerous raids on Dartmouth and Halifax.

== Gallery ==
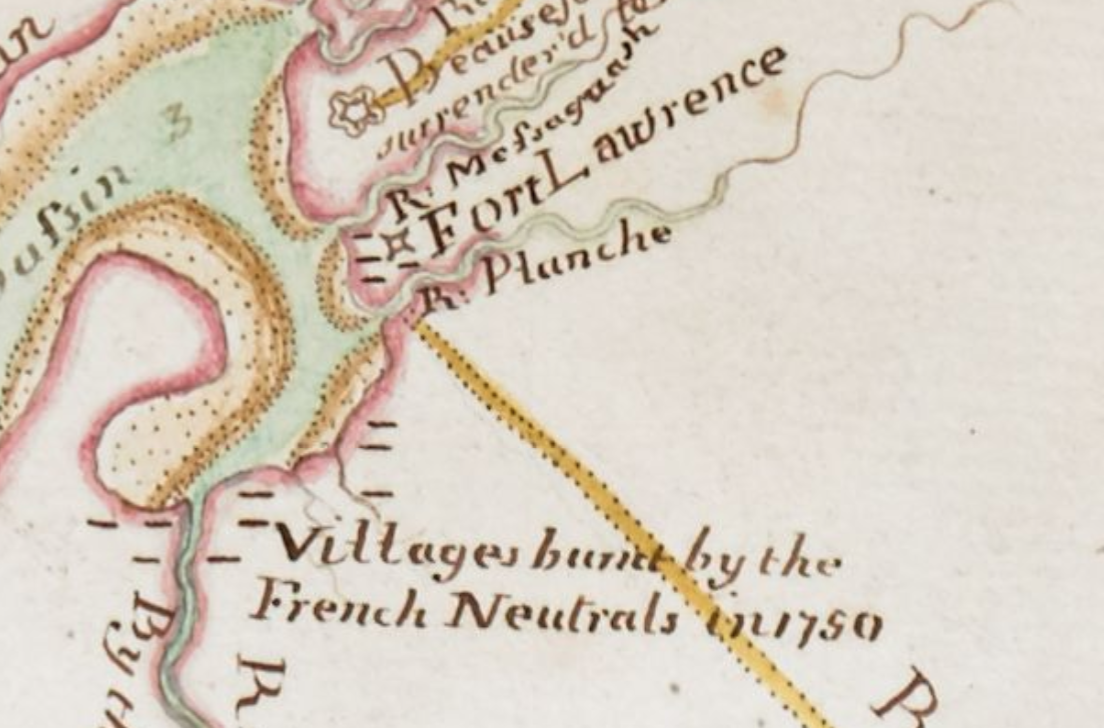
Battle of Chignecto by Charles Morris (inset of A chart of the sea coasts of the peninsula of Nova Scotia, 1755)

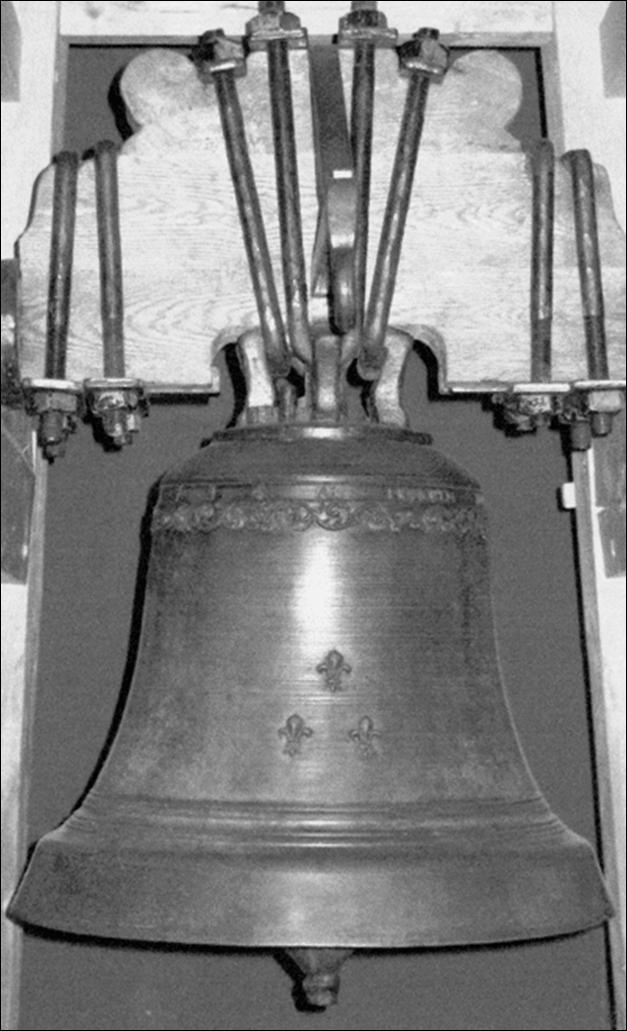
A bell retrieved by Le Loutre Beaubassin church during the battle

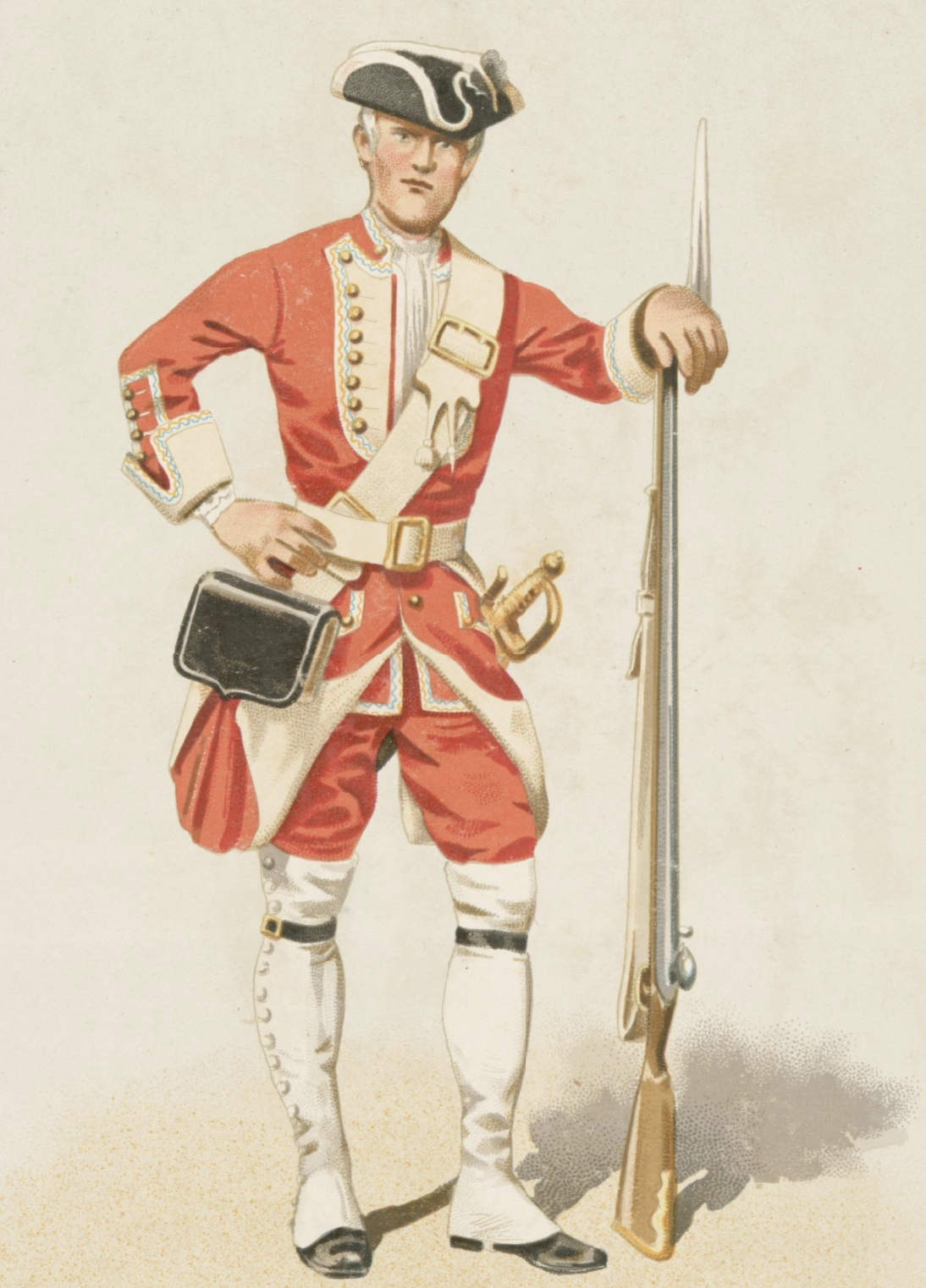
Private, 40th Regiment of Foot, 1742

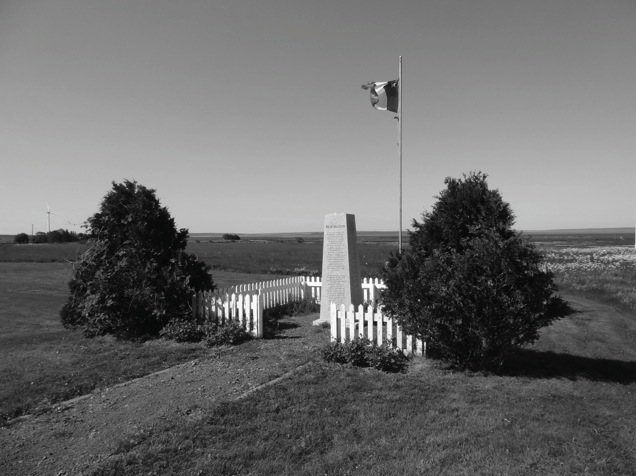
Monument to a village that was burned during the Battle at Chignecto

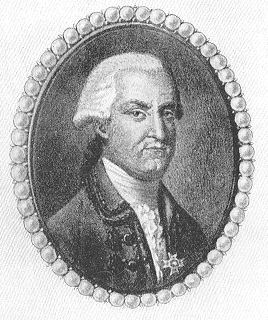
Louis de la Corne, Chevalier de la Corne, Commander at Beausejour

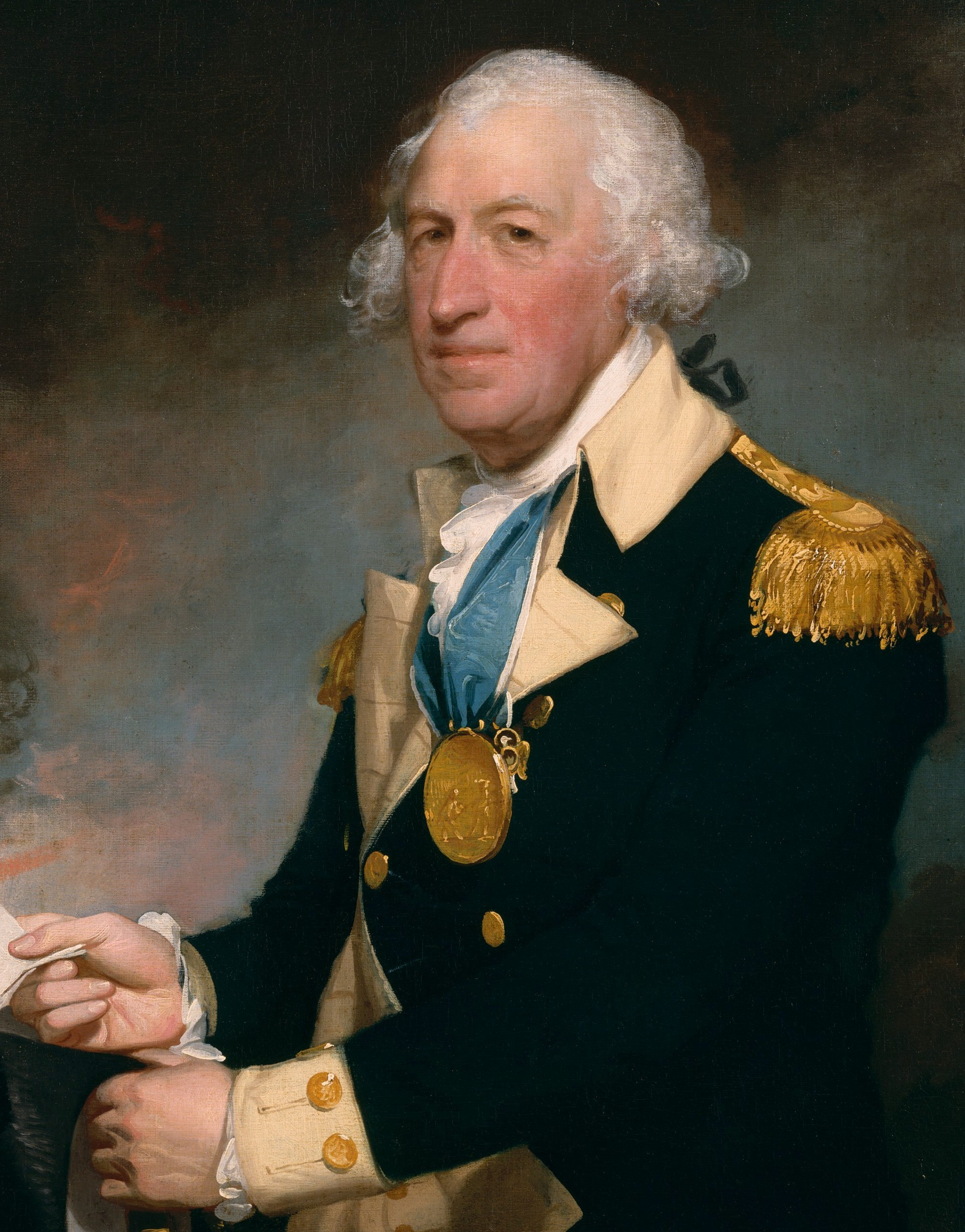
Horatio Gates (45th Regiment)

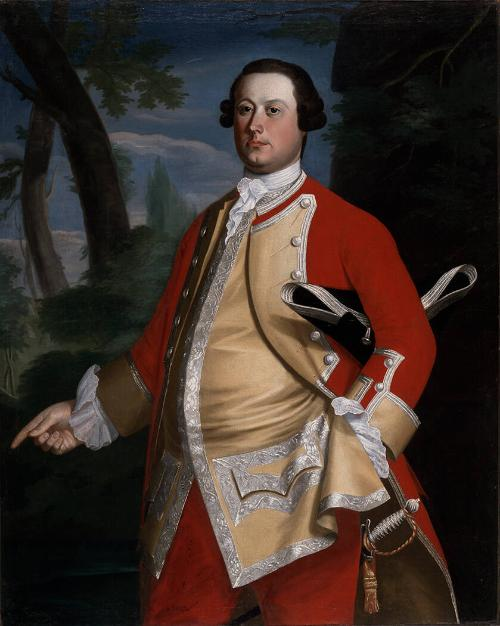
Joshua Winslow - portrait while serving at Fort Lawrence (1755)

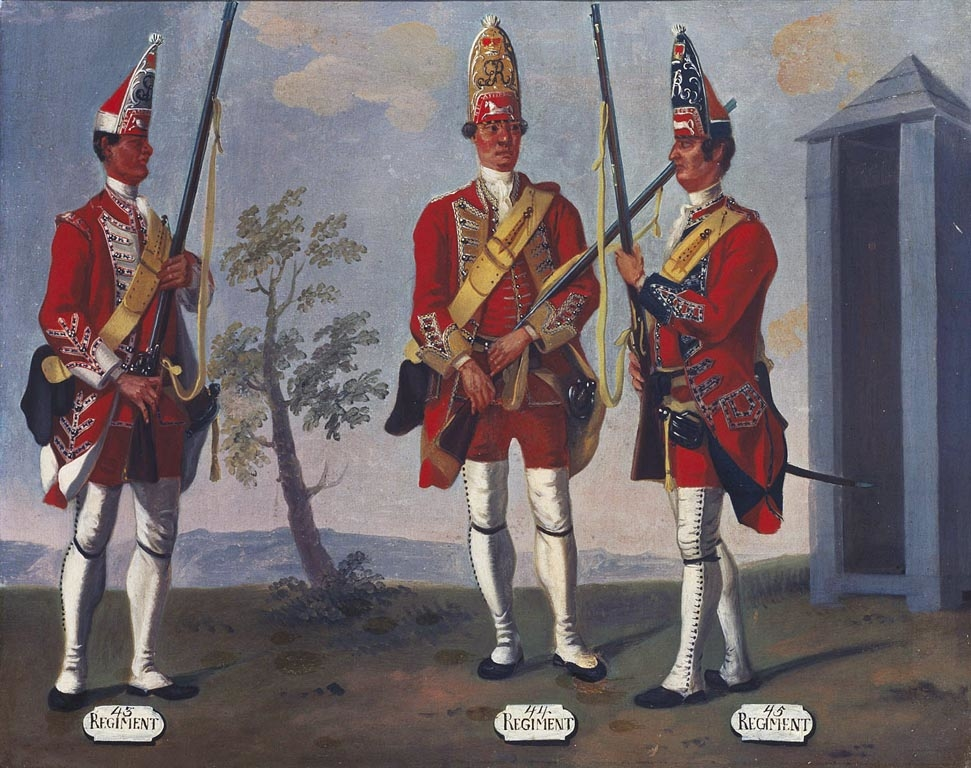
45th Regiment of Foot grenadier (right) by David Morier, 1751

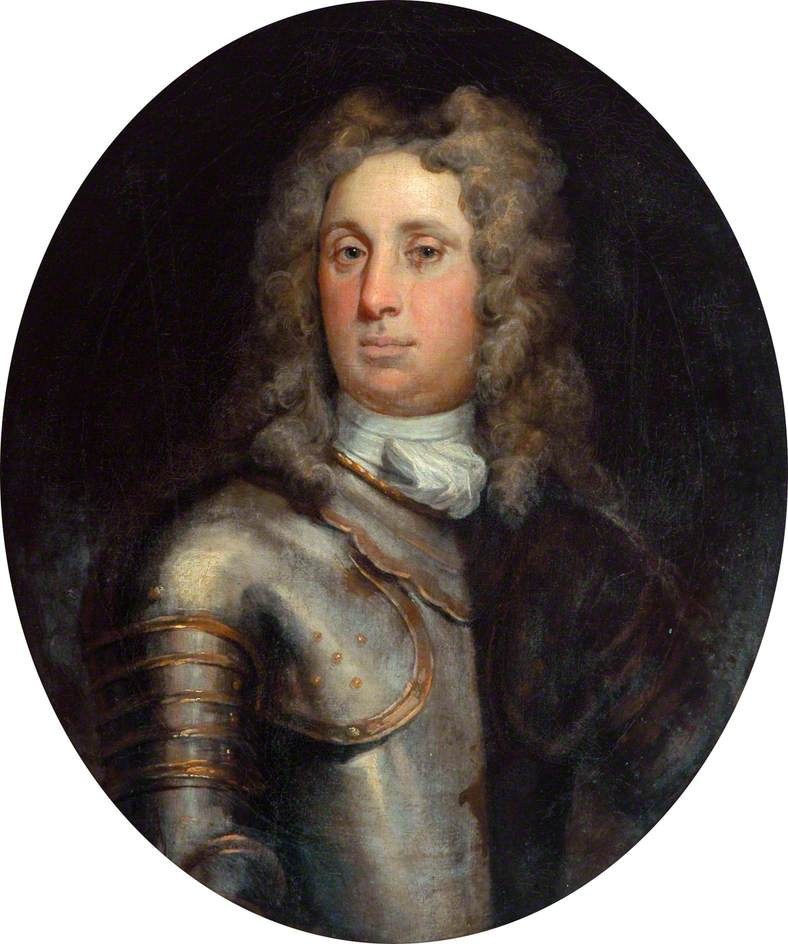
Peregrine Lascelles (47th Regiment)

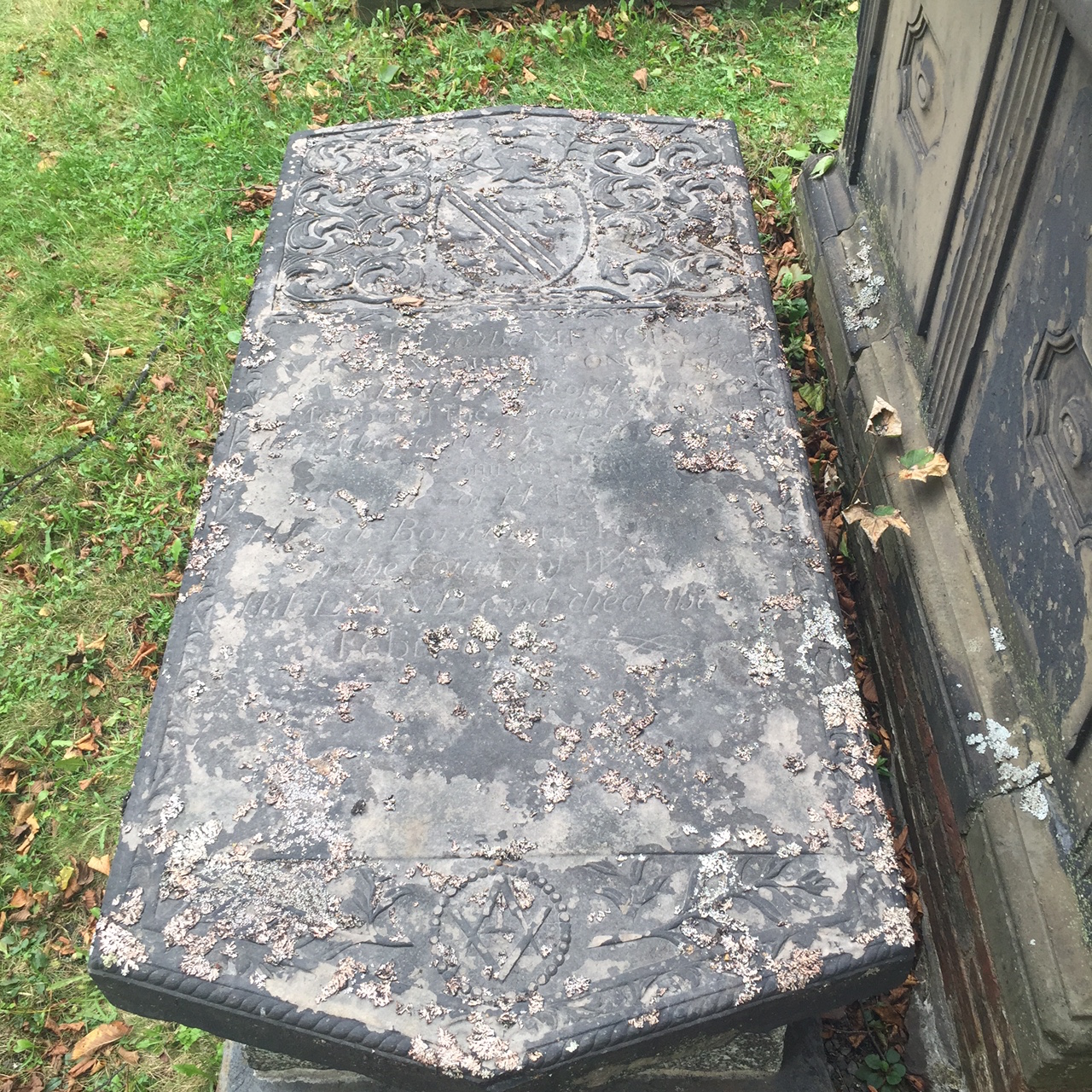
Winckworth Tonge (45th Regiment)

== Literature cited ==
- Faragher, John Mack (2005). A Great and Noble Scheme: The Tragic Story of the Expulsion of the French Acadians from Their American Homeland. W.W Norton & Company. ISBN 978-0-393-05135-3.
- Grenier, John (2008). The Far Reaches of Empire: War in Nova Scotia, 1710-1760. University of Oklahoma Press. ISBN 978-0-8061-3876-3.
- Griffiths, N.E.S. (2005). From Migrant to Acadian: A North American Border People, 1604-1755. McGill-Queen's University Press. ISBN 978-0-7735-2699-0.
- Landry, Peter. The Lion & The Lily. Vol. 1. Victoria: Trafford, 2007.
- Murdoch, Beamish (1866). A History of Nova-Scotia, Or Acadie. Vol. II. Halifax: J. Barnes. pp. 166–167.
- Rompkey, Ronald, ed. Expeditions of Honour: The Journal of John Salusbury in Halifax, Nova Scotia, 1749-53. Newark: U of Delaware P, Newark, 1982.
