= Étienne Bâtard =

Mi'kmaq warrior (died c. 1760)

Étienne Bâtard (Anthony) (died c. 1754 - 1760) was a Mi'kmaq warrior from Miramichi, New Brunswick, Canada.

Bâtard fought in Father Le Loutre's War, assisting the French with fighting against British forces. He is believed to have killed Edward How at the Missaguash River in 1750, as he is responsible for leading a trap in which multiple Micmacs impersonated French officers to join a conference. This resulted in him being seriously injured, and he died a few days later.

He participated in fighting the British in the Battle at Chignecto and the Attack at Jeddore.
