= Hugh Warburton =

British Army officer

General Hugh Warburton (1695 – 26 August 1771) was an officer of the British Army and fought in the French and Indian War with the 45th Regiment of Foot. He later commanded the 27th Regiment of Foot during the Seven Years' War.

== Early life ==
Warburton's (45th) Regiment's Camp, Halifax, Nova Scotia, 1750

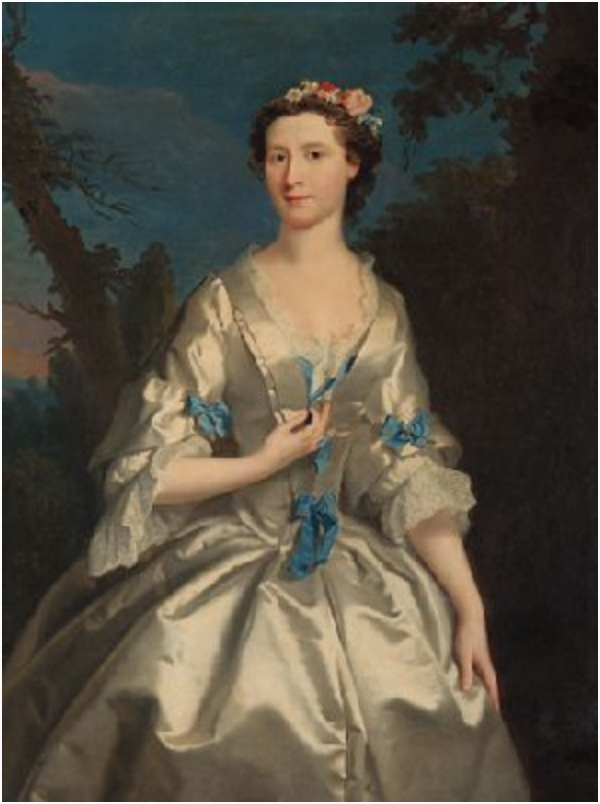
Warburton's sister Jane Campbell, Duchess of Argyll by Joseph Wigmore (painter), 1743

He was the son of Thomas Warburton of Winnington Hall by his wife Anne, second daughter of Sir Robert Williams, 2nd Baronet, of Penrhyn. Thomas Warburton was the son of Sir George Warburton, 1st Baronet, of Arley, by his second wife Diana, daughter of Sir Edward Bishopp, 2nd Baronet, of Parham. Hugh's sister Jane married John Campbell, 2nd Duke of Argyll. She was a Maid of Honour to Queen Anne. Jane died in 1767 and was buried with her husband in Westminster Abbey.

== Career ==
Warburton joined the Army as a cornet on 25 July 1715. On 24 January 1734 he was made lieutenant-colonel of Lord Mark Kerr's Regiment of Dragoons, and on 3 June 1745 colonel of the 45th Regiment of Foot. Along with Colonel Peregrine Thomas Hopson commanding the 29th Regiment, Warburton and the 45th Regiment was first posted to Gibraltar in 1745, before moving to Fortress of Louisbourg in October 1745 for garrison duty under the command of Warburton. The regiment was ranked as the 56th Regiment of Foot in 1747 but was re-ranked the following year as the 45th Regiment of Foot in 1748. On 1 July 1751 the regiment officially adopted the numerical system rather being named after the commander.

After King George's War, the regiment was stationed in Halifax throughout Father Le Loutre's War. Lt Col John Horseman, Major Hung Lettrel, Winckworth Tonge and Horatio Gates served under him in the 45th Regiment. Warburton participated in the Battle at Chignecto. The regiment also fell victim to a raid on Dartmouth in May 1751 during Father Le Loutre's War when Mi'kmaq and Acadia militia from Chignecto, under the command of Acadian Joseph Broussard, raided Dartmouth, Nova Scotia, destroying the town, killing twenty British villagers and torturing and mutilating a sergeant from the 45th Foot. The regiment then defeated the French and native forces at the Battle of Fort Beauséjour in June 1755.

The regiment also fought in the French and Indian War. His regiment under Brigadier General James Wolfe's battalion in the Siege of Louisbourg in July 1758. On 24 September 1761 he transferred from the 45th to the colonelcy of the 27th Regiment of Foot. It then took part in the Invasion of Martinique in January 1762 and the capture of Grenada in February 1762. It also took part in the Battle of Havana in June 1762 during the Anglo-Spanish War: the regiment suffered heavy losses and was evacuated to New York. In August 1767 the regiment returned to Ireland.

Warburton would be with the 27th foot until his death on 26 August 1771. He was promoted to major-general in 1755, lieutenant-general in 1758 and general on 13 April 1770.

He was a Freemason in the Premier Grand Lodge of England.

== Family ==
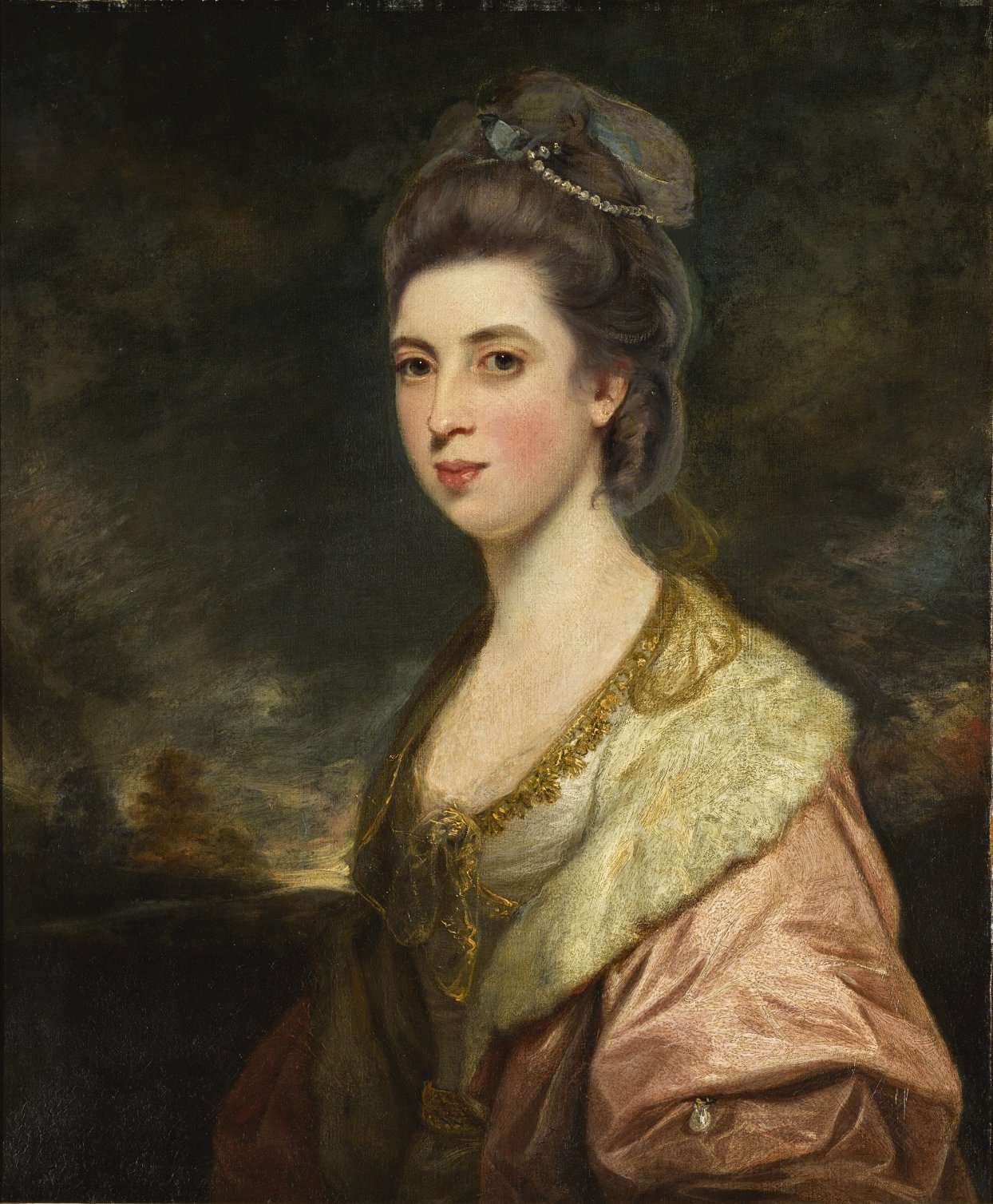
Warburton's only child Anne Susanna by Joshua Reynolds

Warburton married Susanna, daughter and co-heiress of Edward Norris, of Speke. Their only child, Anne Susanna, married Richard Pennant, 1st Baron Penrhyn, but they had no children. After her husband's death Lady Penrhyn sold Winnington Hall to Sir John Thomas Stanley, 7th Baronet, of Alderley; she died on 1 January 1816. Warbuton is buried at Church of the Holy Trinity, Newton St Loe.

Military offices
Preceded by Daniel Houghton	Colonel of the 45th Regiment of Foot; 1745–1761	Succeeded by Andrew Robinson
Preceded by The Lord Blakeney	Colonel of the 27th Regiment of Foot; 1761–1771	Succeeded by Sir Eyre Coote
