= John Gorham (military officer) =

Colonial American ranger (1709–1751)

- Born: 12 December 1709; Yarmouth, Massachusetts Bay
- Died: December, 1751 (aged 41–42); London, Great Britain
- Military career
- Allegiance: Massachusetts Bay
- Branch: Ranger
- Rank: captain (of Independent Company in the British army); lieutenant-colonel (in Massachusetts provincial forces)
- Commands: Gorham's Rangers 1744–1751, and 7th Massachusetts Provincial Infantry Regiment--second in command (1745), acting commander (1746)
- Conflicts: King George's War: Siege of Annapolis Royal (1744); Siege of Louisbourg (1745); Father Le Loutre's War: Battle at St. Croix (1750); Battle at Chignecto (1750)
- Other work: representative

John Gorham (Goreham, Gorum) (12 December 1709 – December 1751) was a New England Ranger and was the first significant British military presence on the frontier of Nova Scotia and Acadia to remain in the region for a substantial period after the Conquest of Acadia (1710). He established the famous "Gorham's Rangers". He also commissioned two armed vessels: the Anson (Captain John Beare) and the Warren (70 tons, Captain Jonathan Davis), who patrolled off Nova Scotia.

Gorham was first commissioned captain of a provincial auxiliary company in June 1744, and was promoted to lieutenant-colonel in the 7th Massachusetts provincial Infantry Regiment in February 1745. Two years later, in 1747, he was commissioned captain of an independent company in the British Army when his unit was adopted into the regular army. He is sometimes confused with his father, Shubael Gorham (born in Barnstable, Massachusetts, 2 September 1686; died at Louisbourg, Nova Scotia, 20 February 1746), a provincial colonel during King George's War. He was the one of only a handful of American rangers - including, Gorham, his younger brother Joseph Gorham, Benoni Danks, and later Robert Rogers - to earn commissions in the British Army. John Gorham was active during King George's War and Father Le Loutre’s War.

== Family ==
The Gorham family had a long history of ranging which began under Benjamin Church. John Gorham I died while fighting alongside Church in the famous Great Swamp Fight. (Gorham, Maine and Gorham, New Hampshire are named for John Gorham I.) John Gorham II also served with Church during the fourth Eastward Expedition into Acadia, which involved the Raid on Chignecto (1696) during King William's War. His son Shubael Gorham was a provincial officer of note during Queen Anne's and King George's War, during the latter he commanded the 7th Massachusetts Provincial Regiment at the Siege of Louisbourg (1745). Finally, John Gorham III, the subject of this article, and his brother Joseph Gorham served in Acadia as rangers, as well as in their father's regiment about Louisburg.

== Historical context ==
Despite the Conquest of 1710 and the subsequent signing of the Treaty of Utrecht in 1713 with France, the British were not able to establish control in Nova Scotia/Acadia for decades. John Gorham and his Rangers arrived in Nova Scotia to move the military and political influence of the British beyond a defensive posture at Annapolis Royal and the fishing village of Canso. Gorham moved the British operation on to the offensive during King George's War.

== King George's War ==
=== Siege of Annapolis Royal (1744) ===
During King George's War, Gorham and his company of Indian rangers from New England were involved in defending Fort Anne from attacks from the French, Acadians, and Mi’kmaq. During the Siege of Annapolis Royal (1744), on 4 October, Gorham and his rangers massacred Mi'kmaq men along with five women and three children that were in two nearby wigwams. Governor Mascarene noted that the New England Rangers way of war was more effective than that practiced by conventional British troops. On another occasion in October, Gorham returned with three scalps and a live native baby.

Governor Shirley wrote in February 1746 that "the great Service which Lieut. Colonel Gorham’s Company of Rangers has been to the Garrison at Annapolis Royal, is a demonstration of the Usefulness of such a Corps."

The Maliseet and Mi'kmaq sought revenge for the ranger's killing of Mi'kmaq families during the siege. During the Siege of Annapolis Royal (1745), the Mi'kmaq and Maliseet took prisoner the captain of a provincial transport vessel, William Pote, as well as some of Gorham's Rangers, including four Wampanoags from Cape Cod: Jacob Chammock, Philip Will, Caleb Popmonet, and Isaac Peck, as well as Peter Dogamus, a Nauset Indian from Yarmouth, Massachusetts. John Gorham himself was not at Annapolis because he was fighting alongside his father in the Siege of Louisbourg. Among other places, Pote and the Native rangers were taken to the Maliseet village Aukpaque on the Saint John River. While at the village, Mi'kmaq from Nova Scotia arrived and, on July 6, 1745, tortured Pote and Chammock as retribution for the killing of family members by members of Gorham's company. On July 10, Pote witnessed another act of revenge when the Mi'kmaq tortured an Indian ranger (possibly Popmonet or Dogamus) at Meductic.

=== Siege of Louisbourg (1745) ===
Gorham fought alongside his father in the Siege of Louisbourg (1745). His father died just after the siege, apparently from natural causes.

Gorham received a commission to defend Nova Scotia. In 1748 he was in command of Gorham's Independent Company of Rangers. This company had in its ranks many of the Wampanoag people, and was stationed in Nova Scotia. During 1748, Gorham's Rangers continued to be with the British regulars at Annapolis Royal. In the autumn of 1748, Gorham destroyed the Acadian resistance at Minas and then sailed (October 19) over to the Saint John River to end the Acadian and Maliseet resistance.

== Father Le Loutre's War ==
John Gorham's Point, Halifax, Nova Scotia, 1750

Soon after the arrival of Governor Edward Cornwallis, on July 14, 1749, Gorham was appointed to the Nova Scotia Council. Despite Gorham being put on the council, Cornwallis was clear that he preferred Francis Bartelo of the two ranger leaders. In 1749, during Father Le Loutre's War, Gorham participated in the construction of Fort Sackville at present-day Bedford, Nova Scotia. While at Fort Sackville, Gorham used the fortification as a base from which he "scoured the country" for Mi'kmaq to scalp as per a proclamation issued by Cornwallis in October 1749. Frontier warfare, including scalping, was the standard practice of warfare between the New England Colonies and the Wabanaki Confederacy in Acadia and Nova Scotia since the outbreak of King William's War in 1689.

He also participated in the Battle at St. Croix and the Battle at Chignecto. Gorham held his position on the council for two years and then in August 1751 Gorham left Nova Scotia for England. He died in London of smallpox in December 1751.

== Legacy ==
- John Gorham Lane in Bedford, Nova Scotia is named in his honor

== See also ==
- Military history of Nova Scotia
