= Anna Green Winslow =

American letter writer and diarist (1759–1780)

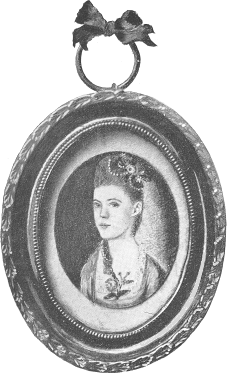
Miniature of Anna Green Winslow

Anna Green Winslow (November 29, 1759 – July 19, 1780), was an American letter writer. A member of the prominent Winslow family of Boston, Massachusetts, United States, she wrote a series of letters to her mother between 1771 and 1773 that portray the daily life of the gentry in Boston at the first stirrings of the American Revolution. She made copies of the letters into an eight-by-six-and-a-half-inch book (20 cm × 17 cm) in order to improve her penmanship, making the accounts a sort of diary as well. This diary, edited by 19th-century American historian and author Alice Morse Earle, was published in 1894 under the title Diary of Anna Green Winslow, A Boston School Girl of 1771, and has never gone out of print. It provides a rare window into the life of an affluent teenage girl in colonial Boston.

== Life and family ==
Anna was born in 1759 in Nova Scotia, where her father, Army officer Joshua Winslow, had moved to serve as commissary-general of the British forces there. In 1764, he was named a judge in the Inferior Court of Common Pleas in Nova Scotia. He also represented Cumberland County in the Nova Scotia House of Assembly from 1770 to 1772. Her mother, born Anna Green, was the daughter of a wealthy merchant and Joshua Winslow's cousin. They married 10 months before Anna's birth.

On the Winslow side, Anna's great-great-great grandfather was John Winslow, the older brother of Pilgrim Edward Winslow, who arrived on the Mayflower, as did Anna's great-great-great grandmother, Mary Chilton. On the Green side, Anna was a direct descendant of another Puritan, Percival Green, who arrived with his wife at Cambridge, Massachusetts in 1635.

The Winslows, unable to find in Halifax the society or the advanced schooling that would "finish" their daughter Anna, sent the then 10-year-old girl to Boston to live with Judge Winslow's older sister, Sarah Deming, and her husband. With her "Aunt Deming", as Anna referred to her, she worked on the skills needed for a well-brought-up lady of the day: penmanship, deportment, sewing, embroidery, lace making, and, as Anna wrote, "dansing; danceing I mean." While staying with her Aunt Deming, Anna attended sewing, dancing, and handwriting schools. Unlike reading (since 1642, the colony of Massachusetts required that all children be taught reading and a trade), writing was optional and mostly taught to boys. It was common throughout the 17th century and into the early decades of the 18th century for even wealthy women to be unable to sign their own names, reduced to scribbling their initials.

According to her diary, Anna moved in the highest social circles. She casually mentioned spending time with the daughters of Colonial Connecticut Governor Matthew Griswold, of John Hancock's law partner and of future Revolutionary War leader Colonel Josiah Quincy. Some of her companions went on to marry future generals, wealthy merchants, eminent clergymen, and other notable men. One of Anna's friends, Martha "Patty" Waldo, later married future US Attorney General Levi Lincoln Sr. and gave birth to two future governors.

Little is known about Anna after she stopped keeping her diary in 1773 when her parents moved the family to Marshfield, although it is known that she was in declining health. Her Loyalist father moved to Quebec in 1775, although Anna and her mother remained in Marshfield.

Anna died on July 19, 1780, probably of consumption, in Hingham, Massachusetts. In 1783, Mrs. Winslow rejoined her husband in Quebec.

== The diary ==
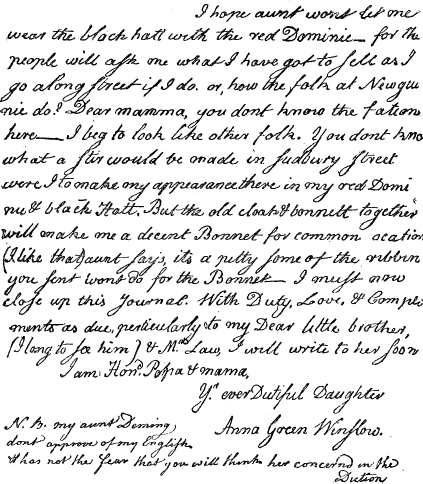
An entry in Anna Green Winslow's diary in her own handwriting which appeared in the 1894 edition

Anna started writing in her diary at the age of 11. She began her diary on November 18, 1771 and it ended on May 31, 1773.

In the letters to her mother, she recorded her advances in sewing and the social niceties, her daily Bible readings aloud to her Aunt Deming, sermons by Puritan preachers that she had heard at the Old South Church—including the fiery Reverend John Bacon—and elsewhere, and her many social engagements. However, like young girls of any age, despite her Puritan heritage, which emphasized modesty and piety, Anna spent nearly as much time expressing her love of fashion, including chastising her mother for a hat she contended made her look like a street seller. Anna made a lament that sounds like any modern teenager's: "Dear mamma, you dont know the fation here—I beg to look like other folk." In one amusing entry, dated May 25, 1773, Anna reveled in her "famous roll," an elaborate wig concocted out of "a red Cow Tail" and very coarse horsehair and blonde human hair, a wig that was a full inch longer than Anna's face. Her aunts did not approve of what they clearly saw as a foolish vanity: "I had my HEDDUS roll on, aunt Storer said it ought to be made less, Aunt Deming said it ought not to be made at all."

Anna's diary hints at the effect Revolutionary fever had on families, who split on the question of how the British Crown treated its 13 American colonies. Earle, who specialized in books on colonial New England, added enough footnotes to nearly double the published book's length. (The diary itself takes up 72 pages.) In the footnotes, Earle made explicit how the American Revolution divided the extended Winslow family and clarified two oblique references to the Boston Massacre. Anna's father was a confirmed Loyalist, but it seems that Anna may have been more like her distant cousin, Patriot Dr. Issac Winslow (whom she visited for eight days, along with his father, Major-General John Winslow at their home in Marshfield, Massachusetts in the spring of 1773), for she referred to herself as "a daughter of liberty" and enthusiastically embraced making homespun in order to eschew imported British goods.

While making some changes for contemporary readers, Earle kept the original fanciful spelling and capitalization in the 1894 publication. A version of the diary used by Earle is held by the Sophia Smith Collection of Women’s History in Smith College Special Collections. Facsimiles of Earle's edition were published in 1970 and 1996.

== Legacy ==
The Old South Meeting House, at which the Boston Tea Party was born and planned, has had programs on Anna Green Winslow. The Meeting House provided an "Anna's World Activity Kit" to parents on request, "filled with hands-on objects and activities that explore the 18th century meeting house through the eyes of 12-year-old congregation member Anna Green Winslow." Some of the programs have focused on introducing Girls, Inc. participants to journal writing, reading and a better understanding of women in history through Anna and poet Phyllis Wheatley.
