= Joshua Winslow =

American-born military officer

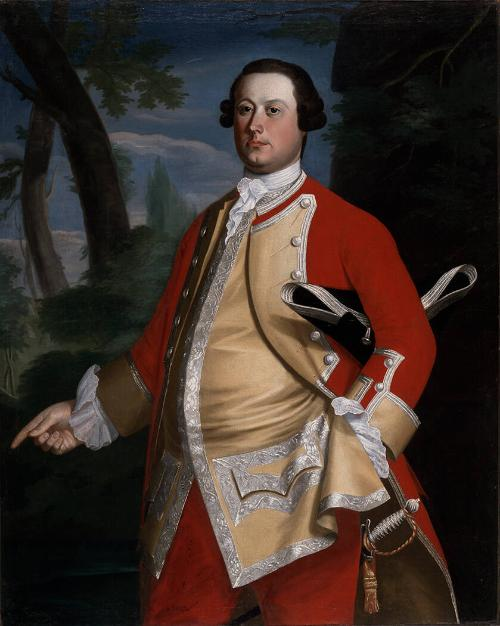
1755 portrait of Winslow by John Singleton Copley created while he was at Fort Lawrence

Joshua Winslow (January 23, 1726 – June 1801) was an American-born military officer, judge and politician. He represented Cumberland County in the Nova Scotia House of Assembly from 1770 to 1772. He was the father of Anna Green Winslow. He was born in Portsmouth, New Hampshire, the son of John Winslow and Sarah Peirce. Winslow was a lieutenant in William Pepperrell's regiment which attacked Louisbourg in 1745. After the fall of Louisbourg, he was named commissary general for British troops in Nova Scotia. During Father Le Loutre's War, he fought in the Battle at Chignecto. In 1758, he married his cousin Anna Green.

With others, he petitioned for representative government in Nova Scotia. Winslow was justice of the peace and a lieutenant in the militia. In 1764, he was named a judge in the Inferior Court of Common Pleas. Winslow had considered returning to a residence in Massachusetts but decided to remain in Nova Scotia once the American Revolution had begun. He moved to Quebec City after he was named deputy paymaster for the British forces at Quebec City in 1782. Winslow served as receiver general for Lower Canada from 1791 to 1794. He died at Quebec at the age of 75 following an extended illness.

== Publications ==
- The journal of Joshua Winslow, recording his participation in the events of the year 1750 memorable in the history of Nova Scotia - journal of Battle at Chignecto
