= Francis Bartelo =

Captain Francis Bartelo (?–1750) was a ranger who served under Edward Cornwallis during Father Le Loutre's War. Bartelo may have served with the Free Companies at Flanders during the war. Bartelo arrived in Halifax on the Merry Jacks with Cornwallis expedition. In February 1750, Bartelo successfully arrested Priest Jacque Girrard and a number of Acadians who participated in the Siege of Grand Pre. After the Battle at St. Croix, he also arrested the Acadians who killed Cornwallis' messenger. In March 1750, Cornwallis wrote, "Gorham is no officer at all; Capt. Bartelo, I can confided in as a good officer, and an honest man." In April, Bartelo was appointed the commander of all the independent companies in Nova Scotia. In September, Cornwallis gave command of Gilman's rangers to Captain Bartelo. He was the commander at Fort Sackville in August 1750, when he served as second in command at the Battle at Chignecto. On August 26 Salusbury recorded that the Mi'kmaq and Acadian militias killed him in the battle. 35 Mi'kmaq and Acadians ambushed Ranger Captain Francis Bartelo, killing him and six of his men while taking seven others captive. The Mi'kmaq conducted ritual torture of the captives throughout the night, which had a chilling effect on the New Englanders.

Apparently unaware of Bartelo's death, in September 1750, Cornwallis wrote, "The command of the Rangers is given to capt. Bartelo, a good officer, and one I can confide in. He has both prudence, activity and courage. Gorham has my leave to go home, as he represents to me great sums are due him for raising and keeping up that company before I came here. He has the king's commission. Though I think him no officer, I can (not) dismiss him."
