= Peregrine Lascelles =

British army officer (1685–1772)

Lieutenant-General Peregrine Lascelles
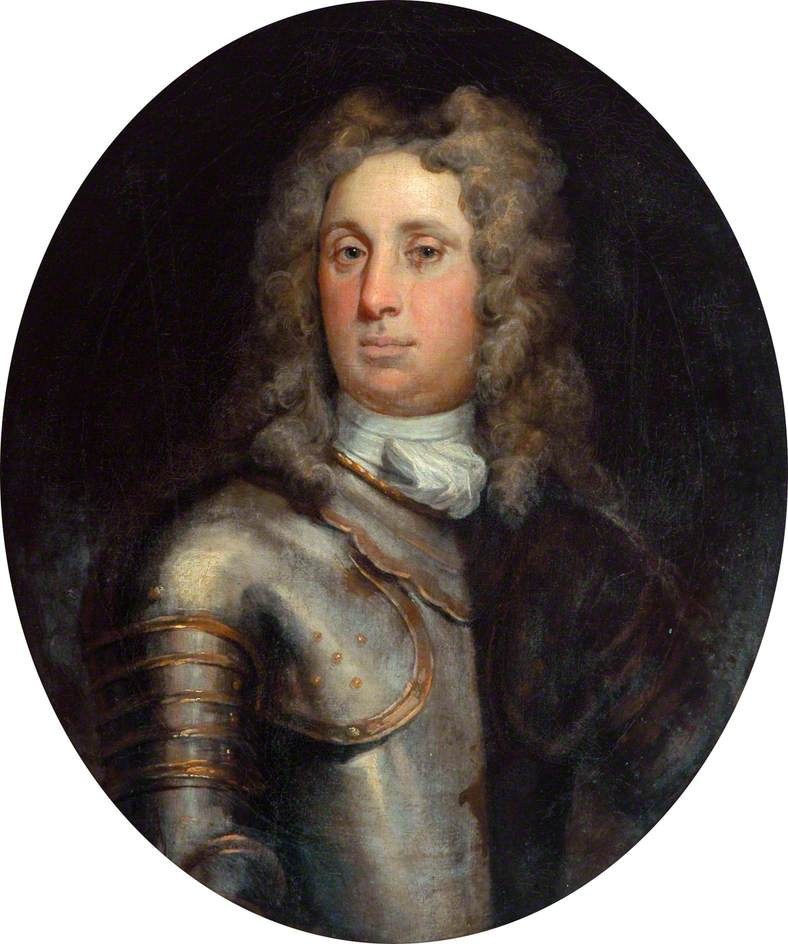
- Portrait attributed to Sir Godfrey Kneller
- Born: 1 June 1685; Whitby, Yorkshire
- Died: 26 March 1772 (aged 86); Whitby, Yorkshire
- Burial place: St Mary's Church, Whitby
- Relatives: Francis Lascelles; Thomas Lascelles
- Military career
- Allegiance: England; Great Britain
- Branch: English Army; British Army
- Service years: 1706–1754
- Rank: Lieutenant-general
- Unit: 47th Regiment of Foot
- Conflicts: War of the Spanish Succession; Battle of Almenar; Battle of Saragossa; Battle of Villaviciosa; Jacobite rising of 1715; Jacobite rising of 1745; Battle of Prestonpans; Father Le Loutre's War; Battle of Fort Beauséjour; French and Indian War; Siege of Louisbourg; Battle of the Plains of Abraham; Battle of Sainte-Foy

Lieutenant-General Peregrine Lascelles (1 June 1685 – 26 March 1772) was a British army officer from Yorkshire. Lascelles served in Spain during the War of the Spanish Succession, then spent most of the next thirty years on garrison duty in Scotland and England. During the Jacobite rising of 1745, he fought at the Battle of Prestonpans in September 1745, where his army was defeated in 15 minutes. Although court-martialled, he was exonerated, and promoted to lieutenant-general, serving in North America until 1759. He retired in 1768 and died in 1772.

== Family ==
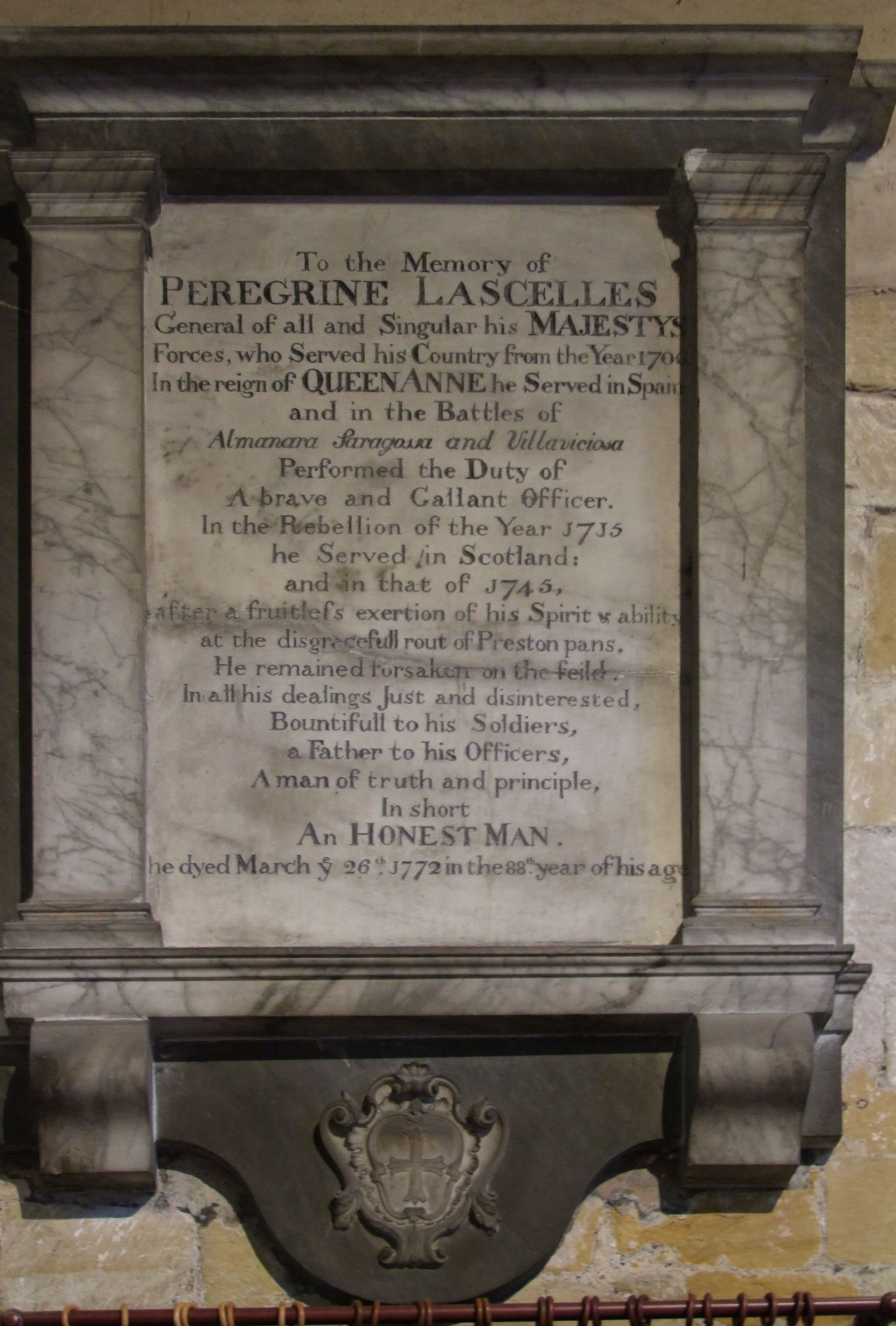
Memorial to Peregrine Lascelles, St Mary's Church, Whitby

The Lascelles family was spread across Northern England, with branches living in Northallerton, Durham, Whitby, York, Harewood House and Terrington. They were also connected to a wider network of Nonconformist mercantile interests in London, Ireland, New England and Barbados.

His grandfather, also Peregrine (1619-1658), was one of three brothers, the others being Francis (1612-1667) and Thomas (1624-1697); all of these supported Parliament during the 1639-1652 Wars of the Three Kingdoms, while Francis took part in the trial of Charles I.

His father Peregrine (died 1699), inherited land in Lythe, outside Whitby, and married Mary Wigginer, who came from a prominent Whitby merchant's family. Peregrine Lascelles was born in 1685 in the Staithside district; he does not appear to have married.

== Career ==
A number of his relatives served in the military, including the engineer Thomas Lascelles (1670-1751), who became Surveyor-General of the Ordnance in 1742. In April 1706, Peregrine was commissioned into Lovelace's Regiment, a new unit raised for the War of the Spanish Succession. He transferred to Lepell's Regiment of Foot in 1708, when Lovelace was appointed Governor-general of New Jersey.

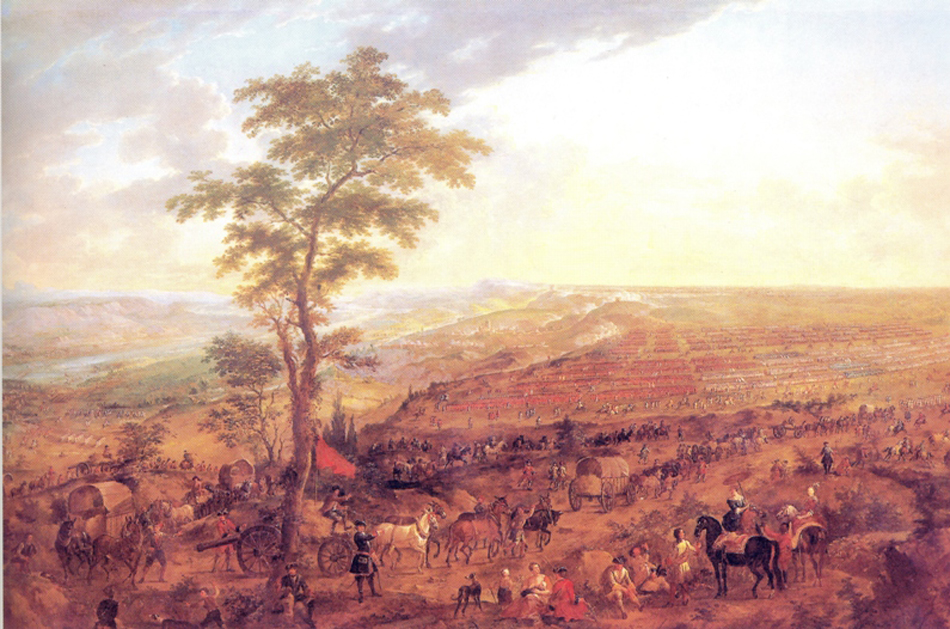
Almanara, July 1710, Lascelles' first major battle

Posted to Spain, he fought at Almanara, Zaragossa and Villaviciosa, where his unit suffered heavy casualties. Lepell, by then senior British officer in Catalonia, reported his infantry regiment suffered over 107 casualties, and only two squadrons of dragoons were fit for action. The regiment was disbanded in November 1712 in the run-up to the 1713 Peace of Utrecht.

Lascelles was placed on half-pay until 1715, when he was appointed Captain in Grants Regiment, a unit formed in response to the Jacobite rising. It did not see action, being used to garrison Edinburgh Castle, then on policing duties after the rising failed. In recognition of his service, Lascelles was made an honorary burgess of Glasgow, along with many others, including his relative Thomas.

Grants was disbanded in 1718 and his movements immediately following this remain unclear; in 1723, he was a captain in Churchill's Dragoons, which performed garrison duty in different parts of Britain, primarily the West Country. In 1733, he was made captain in the Guards, which under the practice known as double-ranking was the equivalent of Lieutenant-Colonel in line regiments.

As a result, in the expansion that followed the outbreak of the War of the Austrian Succession, in 1743 Lascelles was made Colonel of the 47th Foot; raised in 1741, it was employed on the construction of a military road near Loch Lomond, part of a new route from Dumbarton to Inverary. The road was completed in May 1745, two months before Charles Stuart launched the 1745 Rising. After detaching two companies to garrison Edinburgh Castle, Lascelles and the rest of his regiment joined the field army commanded by Sir John Cope.

At the Battle of Prestonpans on 21 September, the Jacobites scattered Cope's army in less than 15 minutes; Lascelles fought his way out, but most of his regiment was captured. He was tried by a court-martial in 1746, along with Cope and Thomas Fowke, a former colleague from Lepells Regiment; all three were exonerated, although Cope never held field command again.

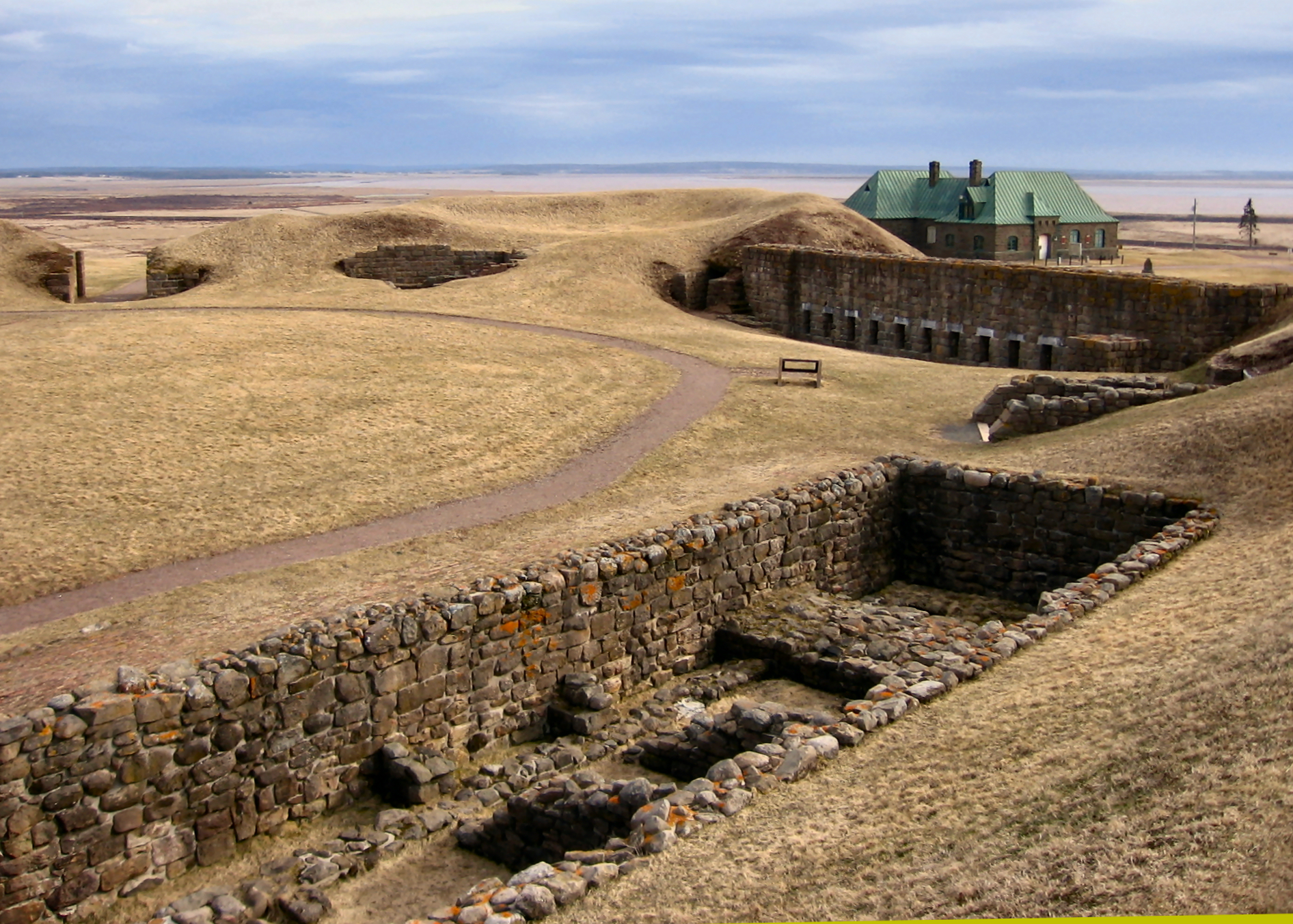
Remains of Fort Beausejour, site of the Battle of Fort Beauséjour in 1755

Lascelles and his regiment were posted to Nova Scotia in 1750; conflict between British and French settlers resulted in a series of clashes known as Father Le Loutre's War, the most significant being the June 1755 Battle of Fort Beauséjour. He remained in North America for at least part of the Seven Years' War, the 47th forming part of the force commanded by James Wolfe that captured Louisbourg in 1758. He was promoted Lieutenant-General shortly afterwards, and the 47th then fought at the capture of Quebec in 1759, where Wolfe was killed, and Sainte-Foy in 1760, before returning to Britain when the war ended in 1763.

It is not clear when he ceased active service, since it was common to retain the position of Colonel, but delegate operational command; he formally resigned from the 47th Regiment of Foot in July 1768. He died on 26 March 1772, and was buried in St Mary's Church, Whitby, where his memorial can still be seen. (Note: It reads; 'Peregrine Lascelles, General of all and Singular his Majestys Forces, who Served his Country from the Year 1706 Queen Anne; he Served in Spain and in the Battles of Almanara, Saragossa and Villaviciosa; Performed the Duty of A brave and Gallant Officer; In the Rebellion of the Year 1715, he Served in Scotland: and in that of 1745 after a fruitless exertion of his Spirit & ability at the disgracefull rout of Prestonpans, He remained forsaken on the field. In all his dealings Just and disinterested, Bountifull to his Soldiers, a Father to his Officers, A man of truth and principle, In short Honest Man he dyed March 26, 1772 in the 88th year of his age') His epitaph was supposedly composed by Doctor John Dealtry (1708-1773), a long-time friend from York, who named his eldest son Peregrine.

== Sources ==
- Adjutant General's Office (1842). Historical Records of the British Army; History of the 13th Light Dragoons. John W Parker.
- Anderson, James (1925). The burgesses & guild brethren of Glasgow, 1573-1750. Skinner & Co for the Scottish Record Society.
- Blaikie, Walter Biggar, ed. (1916). Publications of the Scottish History Society (Volume Ser. 2, Vol. 2 (March, 1916) 1737-1746). Scottish History Society.
- Charlton, Lionel (1779). The history of Whitby, and of Whitby abbey, Volume III. A Ward, York.
- Clay, William (1890). Abstracts of Yorkshire wills in the time of the Commonwealth; Volume IX. Yorkshire Archaeological & Topographical.
- Dalton, Charles (1902). English army lists and commission registers, 1661–1714 Volume V. Eyre and Spottiswood.
- Dalton, Charles (1904). English army lists and commission registers, 1661–1714 Volume VI. Eyre and Spottiswood.
- Downham, John (May 2013). "The 47th (Lancashire) Regiment of Foot". Lancashire Infantry Museum. Duke of Lancaster's Regiment. Archived from the original on 21 November 2021.
- Hill, David (12 May 2018). "Turner and Scotland #2: Loch Lomond from Colonel Lascelles' monument, 1801".
- HMSO (1769). Calendar of Home Office papers of the reign of George III : 1760-1775, preserved in Her Majesty's Public Record Office. HMSO.
- Jones, John (1859). History and Antiquities of Harewood, in the County of York, with topographical notices of its parishes and neighbourhoods. Simpkin, Marshall & Co.
- Leslie, JH (1916). Notes and Queries, 12th Series, Volume II. Frank Chance.
- Lord Elcho, David (1907). Charteris, Edward Evan (ed.). A short account of the affairs of Scotland : in the years 1744, 1745, 1746. David Douglas, Edinburgh.
- Reid, Stuart (2014). Sheriffmuir 1715. Frontline Books. ISBN 978-1848327320.
- Royle, Trevor (2016). Culloden; Scotland's Last Battle and the Forging of the British Empire. Little, Brown. ISBN 978-1408704011.
- Tumath, Andrew (2013). "The British Army in Catalonia after the Battle of Brihuega 1710-1712". Journal of the Society for Army Historical Research. 91 (367): 182–205. JSTOR 44232207.
- Webb, Stephen Saunders (1987). The Governors-General: The English Army and the Definition of the Empire, 1569-1681. Omohundro Institute and University of North Carolina Press. ISBN 978-0807841860.

Military offices
| Preceded by Sir John Mordaunt | 47th (Lancashire) Regiment; 1743–1768 | Succeeded by Sir Guy Carleton, 1st Baron Dorchester |
