= Edward How (cricketer) =

English cricketer (1974–2012)

Personal information
- Full name: Edward Joseph How
- Born: 16 May 1974; Amersham, Buckinghamshire, England
- Died: 28 March 2012 (aged 37); Val-d'Isère, Savoie, France
- Batting: Right-handed
- Bowling: Left-arm medium-fast

Domestic team information
- Years: Team
- 1995–1997: Cambridge University

Career statistics
Competition	First-class
Matches	14
Runs scored	7
Batting average	1.40
100s/50s	–/–
Top score	7*
Balls bowled	1,774
Wickets	13
Bowling average	88.07
5 wickets in innings	1
10 wickets in match	–
Best bowling	5/59
Catches/stumpings	2/–
- Source: Cricinfo, 2 May 2021

Edward Joseph How (16 May 1974 – 28 March 2012) was an English first-class cricketer, banker, and educator.

How was born in Amersham in May 1974. He was educated at Dr. Challoner's Grammar School before going up to Gonville and Caius College, Cambridge. While studying at Cambridge, he played first-class cricket for Cambridge University Cricket Club between 1995 and 1997, making fourteen appearances. A largely ineffective left-arm medium-fast bowler against first-class county opponents, he took 13 wickets at an average of 88.07. His one bowling performance of note came against Kent in 1997, with figures of 5 for 59. He also played football for Cambridge University A.F.C., earning a football blue.

After graduating from Cambridge, How worked in the City of London for Deutsche Bank, becoming a vice president at the bank. He then changed careers, becoming a chemistry teacher at Charterhouse School, where he also coached cricket and football. How was killed in an off-piste skiing accident at Val-d'Isère in France on 28 March 2012, having fallen 200 metres (660 ft) to his death. He was survived by his wife and child.
