= Edward How (priest) =

Anglican Archdeacon

Edward How was an Anglican Archdeacon in Ireland in the late 17th-century.

How was born in County Armagh and educated at Trinity College, Dublin. He was Commonwealth Minister at Charlemont, County Armagh from 1658; and Archdeacon of Clogher from 1661 until his death in 1682.
