= Edward How (military officer) =

Edward How (c. 1702 – October 1750) was a British officer, diplomat and member of the Nova Scotia Council. He was married to an Acadian. In the 1730s, How rebuilt Fort William Augustus at Canso, Nova Scotia. During King George's War he fought in the Siege of Annapolis Royal (1744) and was later wounded and taken prisoner in the Battle of Grand Pre. In July 1749, he was appointed to the Nova Scotia Council. During Father Le Loutre's War, a Mi'kmaq militia assassinated him shortly after the Battle at Chignecto.

== Legacy ==
- namesake of How's Island off of Canso, Nova Scotia

== See also ==
- Deborah How
