= Northeast Coast campaign =

Northeast Coast campaign may refer to:

- Northeast Coast campaign (1675)
- Northeast Coast campaign (1676)
- Northeast Coast campaign (1677)
- Northeast Coast campaign (1703)
- Northeast Coast campaign (1712)
- Northeast Coast campaign (1723)
- Northeast Coast campaign (1724)
- Northeast Coast campaign (1745)
- Northeast Coast campaign (1746)
- Northeast Coast campaign (1747)
- Northeast Coast campaign (1750)
- Northeast Coast campaign (1755)
- Northeast Coast campaign (1756)
