= Attack at Mocodome =

1753 Battle in Nova Scotia

Coordinates: 45°18′22″N 61°37′25″W

- Part of Father Le Loutre's War
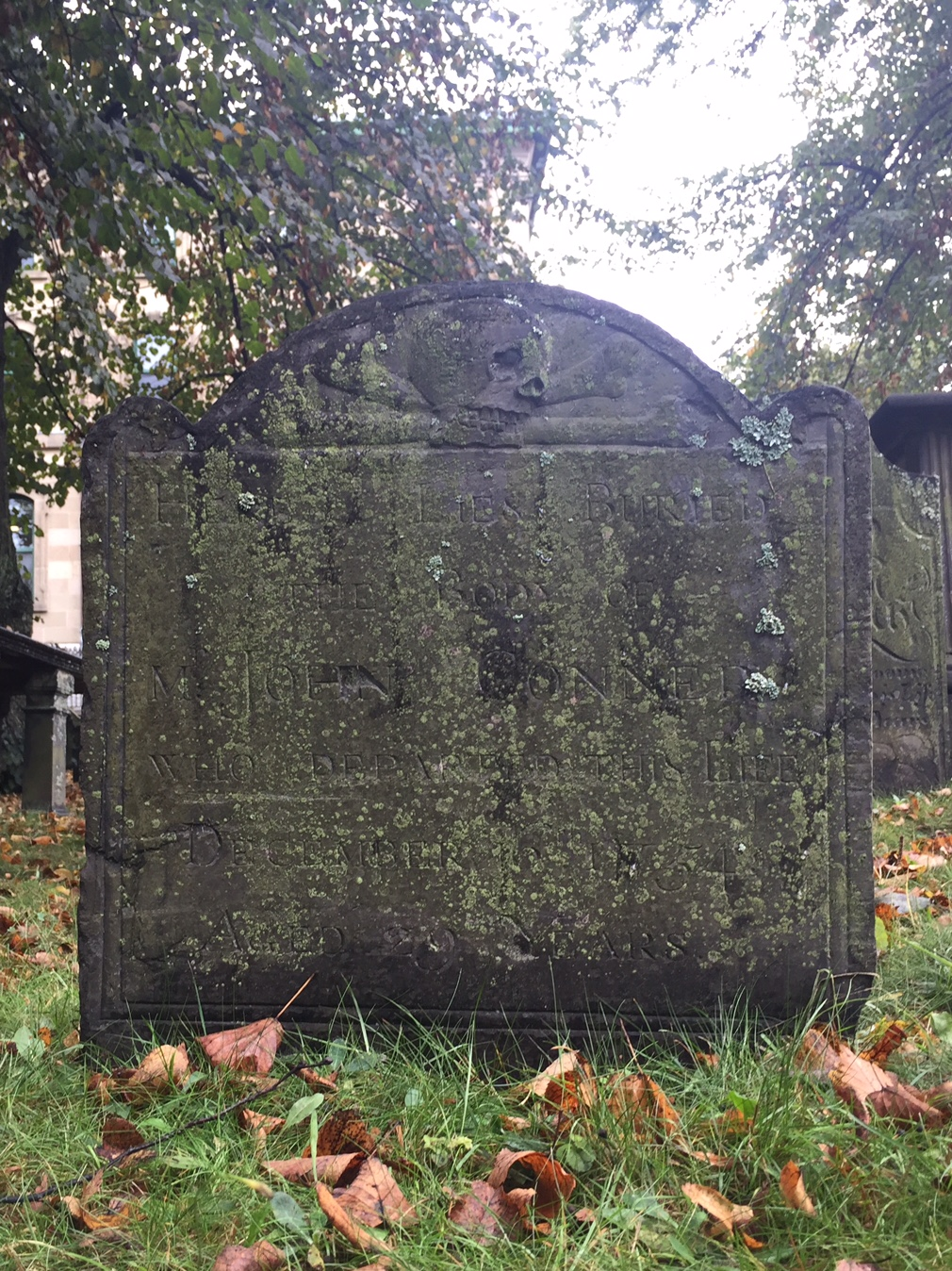
- John Connor, Old Burying Ground (Halifax, Nova Scotia)
Date	February 21, 1753
Location	Mocodome (present-day Country Harbour), Nova Scotia
Result	Mi'kmaq victory

Belligerents
Mi'kmaq	British America

Commanders and leaders
Unknown	John Connor; James Grace; Michael Haggarthy †; John Power †

Strength
Unknown	

Casualties and losses
6 Mi'kmaq	2 killed, 2 prisoners

The attack at Mocodome was a battle which occurred during Father Le Loutre's War in present-day Country Harbour, Nova Scotia (Note: Stephen Patterson (1998), p. 97, reports the attack happened on the coast between Country Harbour and Tor Bay. Ruth Whitehead (1991), p. 137, reports the location was a little harbour to the westward of Torbay, "Martingo", "port of Mocodome". Beamish Murdoch (1865), p. 410, identifies Mocodome as present-day "Country Harbour".) on February 21, 1753 which saw two British mariners and six Mi'kmaq killed. The battle ended any hope for the survival of the Treaty of 1752 signed by Governor Peregrine Hopson and Mi'kmaq chief Jean-Baptiste Cope.

== Historical context ==
Despite the British Conquest of Acadia in 1710, Nova Scotia remained primarily occupied by Catholic Acadians and Mi'kmaq. By the time Cornwallis had arrived in Halifax, there was a long history of the Wabanaki Confederacy (which included the Mi'kmaq) attacking British colonists attempting to establish new settlements along the New England frontier in Maine (See the Northeast Coast Campaigns 1688, 1703, 1723, 1724, 1745, 1746, 1747).

To prevent the establishment of a permanent British colonial presence in the region, Mi'kmaq raided the New England settlements of present-day Shelburne (1715) and Canso (1720). A generation later, Father Le Loutre's War began when Edward Cornwallis arrived to establish Halifax with 13 transports on June 21, 1749. The British quickly began to establish other colonial settlements. To guard against Mi'kmaq, Acadian and French attacks on their new settlements, British fortifications were erected in Halifax (1749), Bedford (Fort Sackville) (1749), Dartmouth (1750), Lunenburg (1753) and Lawrencetown (1754). There were numerous Mi'kmaq and Acadian raids on these villages such as the Raid on Dartmouth (1751).

After the 1749 Raid on Dartmouth, Governor Edward Cornwallis offered a bounty on the head of every Mi'kmaq. Cornwallis paid the New England Rangers the same rate per scalp as the French paid the Mi'kmaq for British scalps. (Note: Cornwallis's proclamation was part a tradition of European colonial authorities in the Americas issuing scalp bounties against their enemies. These were typically collected by frontiersmen and irregular forces, as European militaries were unsuited at frontier warfare against Native Americans. However, Cornwallis and his fellow officers occasionally expressed dismay over the tactics employed by colonial forces and Native Americans (See Grenier, p.152, Faragher, p. 405;, Hand, p.99).)

After eighteen months of inconclusive fighting, uncertainties and second thoughts began to disturb both the Mi'kmaq and the British leadership. By the summer of 1751, Governor Cornwallis began a more conciliatory policy. On 16 February 1752, hoping to lay the groundwork for a peace treaty, Cornwallis repealed his 1749 scalp proclamation against the Wabanaki Confederacy. For more than a year, Cornwallis sought out Mi'kmaq leaders willing to negotiate a peace. He eventually gave up, resigned his commission and left the colony.

With a new Governor in place, Governor Peregrine Thomas Hopson, the first willing Mi'kmaq negotiator was Cope. On 22 November 1752, Cope finished negotiating a peace for the Mi'kmaq at Shubenacadie. (Note: Historian William Wicken (2002), p. 184, notes that there is controversy about this assertion. While there are claims that Cope made the treaty on behalf of all the Mi'kmaq, there is no written documentation to support this assertion.) The basis of the treaty was the one signed in Boston which closed Dummer's War (1725). (Note: For a detailed discussion of the treaty see Wicken (2002), pp. 183–189) Cope tried to get other Mi'kmaq chiefs in Nova Scotia to agree to the treaty but was unsuccessful. The Governor became suspicious of Cope's actual leadership among the Mi'kmaq people. Of course, Le Loutre and the French were outraged at Cope's decision to negotiate at all with the British.

== Battle ==
According to Charles Morris's account, John Connor and three other mariners onboard the British schooner Dunk from Canso, Nova Scotia, put into Jeddore and looted Mi'kmaq-owned stores, which consisted of 40 barrels of provisions given them by the Governor. At present-day Country harbour on 21 February 1753, nine Mi'kmaq from present-day Antigonish (also known as Nartigouneche) captured Connor and the three other crew members from the Dunk: James Grace, Michael Haggarthy and John Power. The Mi'kmaq fired on them and drove them toward the shore. Other natives joined in and boarded the schooner, forcing them to run their vessel into an inlet. The Mi'kmaq then captured, killed and scalped Haggarthy and Power. The Mi'kmaq took Connor and Grace captive for seven weeks. After seven weeks in captivity, on April 8, the two captives killed six Mi'kmaq, including four men (and a woman and her child in retaliation for the Mi'kmaq murder of Conner's wife and son in 1751). Free of their captors, Connor and Grace effected their escape.

In contrast, according to Anthony Casteel, after looting provisions from the Mi'kmaq at Jeddore, the Dunk accidentally was shipwrecked and two of the four crew members drowned. The two survivors, despite the Mi'kmaw showing hospitality towards them, killed seven Mi'kmaq: two men, three women, and two children before escaping. In response, the Mi'kmaq were reported to have gone to Halifax to complain about their provisions were being looted during the fishing season.

A French officer at Louisbourg criticized Casteel's account of events as being unsubstianted. (Note: The Mi'kmaq account of the crew of the Dunk killing infants or babies in the womb echoes the same accusations against John Gorham in his attack on Mi'kmaq near Annapolis in 1744 (See Malliard's journal). The assertion against Gorham is not supported by the evidence. In both accounts, the influence of French Catholic priests on the embellishment of these incidents is apparent. Accusing the enemy of killing babies and babies in the womb has a long history in war propaganda to objectify the enemy.) If Connor and Grace were only motivated by scalp money as Casteel asserted, it is unclear who would have paid them for Mi'kmaw scalps given Governor Cornwallis ended the bounty for Mi'kmaw prisoners and scalps the previous year.

== Aftermath ==
In response, on the night of April 21, under the leadership of Jean-Baptiste Cope, the Mi'kmaq attacked a British schooner at Jeddore. There were nine British sailors and one Acadian, Anthony Casteel, who was serving as an interpreter. The Mi'kmaq killed the sailors and let Casteel go at Port Toulouse, where the Mi'kmaq sank the schooner after looting it. Cope's peace treaty was ultimately rejected by most of the other Mi'kmaq leaders. Cope burned the treaty six months after he signed it. Despite the collapse of peace on the eastern shore, the British did not formally renounce the Treaty of 1752 until 1756.

== See also ==
- List of massacres in Canada
