= Raid on Dartmouth (1749) =

1749 raid of a sawmill in Nova Scotia

Coordinates: 44°39′50″N 63°34′5.4″W

- Part of Father Le Loutre's War
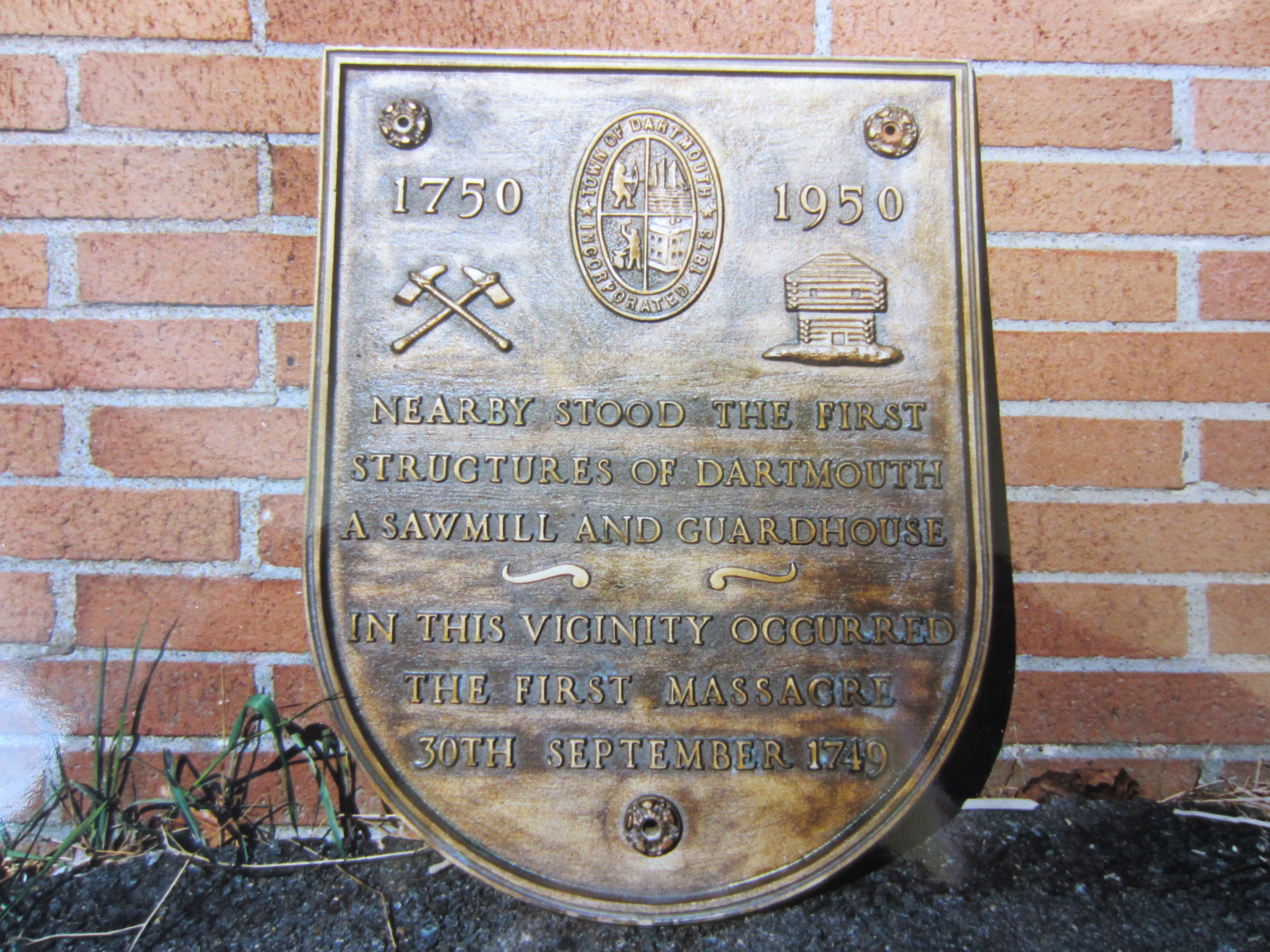
- Plaque to Raid on Dartmouth (1749) and the blockhouse that was built in response (1750), Dartmouth Heritage Museum
Date	September 30, 1749
Location	Dartmouth, Nova Scotia
Result	Mi'kmaw victory

Belligerents
Mi'kmaw militia Acadian militia	British America

Commanders and leaders
	Major Ezekiel Gilman

Strength
40 Mi'kmaq	6 British

Casualties and losses
3 killed	4 killed, 2 wounded

The Raid on Dartmouth (1749) occurred during Father Le Loutre's War on September 30, 1749 when a Mi'kmaw militia from Chignecto raided Major Ezekiel Gilman's sawmill at present-day Dartmouth, Nova Scotia, killing four workers and wounding two. This raid was one of seven the Wabanaki Confederacy and Acadians would conduct against the settlement during the war.

== Historical context ==
Despite the British Conquest of Acadia in 1710, Nova Scotia remained primarily occupied by Catholic Acadians and Mi'kmaq. Father Le Loutre's War began when Edward Cornwallis arrived to establish Halifax with 13 transports on June 21, 1749.

By the time Cornwallis had arrived in Halifax, there was a long history of the Wabanaki Confederacy (which included the Mi'kmaq) killing British civilians along the New England/Acadia border in Maine (See the Northeast Coast Campaigns 1688, 1703, 1723, 1724, 1745, 1746, 1747).

After establishing an initial settlement in Halifax in the summer of 1749, it was imperative that Governor Edward Cornwallis make peace with the Native peoples of the province before further colonization could proceed. On 15 August, Governor Cornwallis and members of his Council met with representatives of the Penobscot, Naridgwalk, St. John, Cape Sable and other tribes aboard HMS Beaufort in Halifax Harbour. They agreed to sign a redrafted treaty of 1752 that would be ratified at a later date.

Governor Cornwallis was informed in August that two vessels were attacked by the Indians at Canso whereby "three English and seven Indians were killed." Council believed the attack had been orchestrated by Abbe Le Loutre.

Prior to this incident, the priest had written the following to the minister of marine in France:

As we cannot openly expose the English ventures, I think that we cannot do better than to incite the indians to continue warring on the English; my plan is to persuade the Indians to send word to the English that they will not permit new settlements to be made in Acadia. . . I shall do my best to make it look to the English as if this plan comes from the Indians and that I have no part in it."

To guard against Mi'kmaq, Acadian and French attacks on the new Protestant settlements, British fortifications were erected in Halifax (1749), Bedford (Fort Sackville) (1749), Dartmouth (1750), Lunenburg (1753) and Lawrencetown (1754).

On 24 September 1749, the Mi'kmaq formally wrote to Governor Cornwallis through Father Maillard, proclaiming their ownership of the land, and expressing their opposition to the British actions in settling at Halifax. Some historians have read this letter as declaration of hostility against the British. Other historians have questioned that interpretation.

Raids started at Canso, then Chignecto and then at present-day Dartmouth. During Father Le Loutre's War, there were four raids on Dartmouth.

Major Ezekiel Gilman (Gillman) was in command of the mill at Dartmouth. He had worked in the lumber industry in Exeter, New Hampshire. He had distinguished himself in Colonel Samuel Moore's Regiment at the Siege of Louisbourg (1745), where he engineered moving the British canons across boggy terrain. Sir William Pepperrell referred to Gilman as "very serviceable" in the expedition. (He returned various times to New Hampshire but died in Nova Scotia in 1755.) (Note: Read a memorial of Ezekiel Gilman, together with a state of his case, setting forth his having been appointed captain of a company in the regiment raised in New Hampshire for the intended expedition against Canada, but that when the expedition was at an end his name was left out of the pay rolls and his company given to one of Governor Wentworth's sons.)

== Raid ==
On September 30, 1749, about forty Mi'kmaq attacked six men who were in Dartmouth cutting trees. The Mi'kmaq killed four of them on the spot, took one prisoner and one escaped. Two of the men were scalped and the heads of the others were cut off. The attack was on the saw mill at Dartmouth Cove (Mill Location ), which was under the command of Major Ezekiel Gilman. A detachment of rangers was sent after the raiding party and cut off the heads of two Mi'kmaq and scalped one.

== Consequence ==
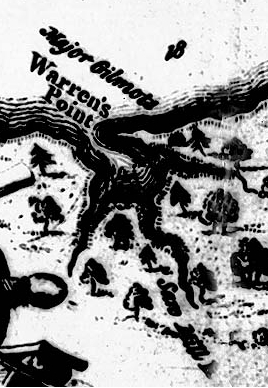
Major Gilman's (Gilmot's) sawmill, Dartmouth Nova Scotia 1750

On October 2, 1749, to stop the attacks on the emigrants, Governor Edward Cornwallis created an extirpation proclamation directing "all Officers Civil and Military, and all His Majesty's Subjects or others to annoy, distress, take or destroy the Savage commonly called Micmac, wherever they are found." As part of the proclamation he offered a bounty for the capture or scalps of Mi'kmaw men and for the capture of women and children: "every Indian you shall destroy (upon producing his Scalp as the Custom is) or every Indian taken, Man, Woman or Child." The three companies scoured the land around Halifax looking for Mi'kmaq, however, the Rangers never made contact with any Mi'kmaq.

Cornwallis also stationed thirty men guarding the saw mill over the following winter, with two armed vessels. Gilman left unannounced to New England by April 1750. (Note: Gilman seems to have returned having purchased at auction the mill again in 1752.) By July, Cornwallis had given the saw mill to Clapham to manage. In September, he gave command of Gilman's rangers to Captain Francis Bartelo.

Despite Cornwallis' efforts to defend the community, in July 1750, the Mi'kmaq killed and scalped seven men who were at work in Dartmouth. In August 1750, 353 people arrived on the ship Alderney and began the town of Dartmouth, which was laid out in the autumn of that year. The following month, on September 30, 1750, Dartmouth was attacked again by the Mi'kmaq and five more residents were killed. In October 1750 a group of about eight men went out "to take their diversion; and as they were fowling, they were attacked by the Indians, who took the whole prisoners; scalped ... [one] with a large knife, which they wear for that purpose, and threw him into the sea ..."

In March 1751, the Mi'kmaq attacked on two more occasions, bringing the total number of raids to six in the previous two years. (Note: For the two raids that happened in March 1751 see Grenier (2008), p. 160) Three months later, on May 13, 1751, Broussard led sixty Mi'kmaq and Acadians to attack Dartmouth again, in what would be known as the "Dartmouth Massacre".

== Controversy ==
Mi'kmaw historian Daniel N. Paul has disputed British accounts of the raid. Paul dismisses the possibility that Mi'kmaw people would attack unarmed civilians and speculates, instead, that the woodcutters were probably armed and better equipped compared to the Mi'kmaq raiders. Paul provides no historical evidence to support his speculations. In his book We Were Not the Savages Paul writes:

The question this poses is, why was this group of 'defenseless' Englishmen sent out into the forest alone to cut wood during a time of war without troop protection and thus left vulnerable to attack? If this was the case then it smacks of gross incompetence on a British officer's part. If the story is true and not propaganda, a more credible reason for them being sent out without troop protection is that they were not defenseless but as well-armed as the Mi'kmaq and probably more so. This can be reasonably assumed because, as woodcutters, they had axes to cut wood with, which alone would have made them possessors of weapons as lethally effective, and probably more reliable, than most of the arms the Mi'kmaq had access to. In any event, because the English were assaulting the Mi'kmaq and stealing their territory, Cornwallis and his Council should not have been so affronted and reacted so barbarously when the Mi'kmaq fought back. In fighting back to preserve their freedom and country, the Mi'kmaq paid a heavy price.

— Daniel N. Paul, We Were Not the Savages

Paul asserts that Cornwallis used "a few incidents such as these" to justify his bounty proclamation. Cornwallis' decision to put a bounty on the Mi'kmaq did not pivot simply on the Raid on Dartmouth in 1749. By the time Cornwallis had arrived in Halifax, there was a long history of conflict between the Wabanaki Confederacy (which included the Mi'kmaq) and the various British American colonies of North America; with the Wabanaki launching several raids along the New England-Acadia Border in Maine in response to British settlement (See the Northeast Coast Campaigns 1688, 1703, 1723, 1724, 1745). The proclamation was modelled on earlier proclamations used by New England Governors.

== See also ==
- List of massacres in Canada
