= Daniel N. Paul =

Canadian Mi'kmaw historian and writer (1938–2023)

Daniel N. Paul CM ONS
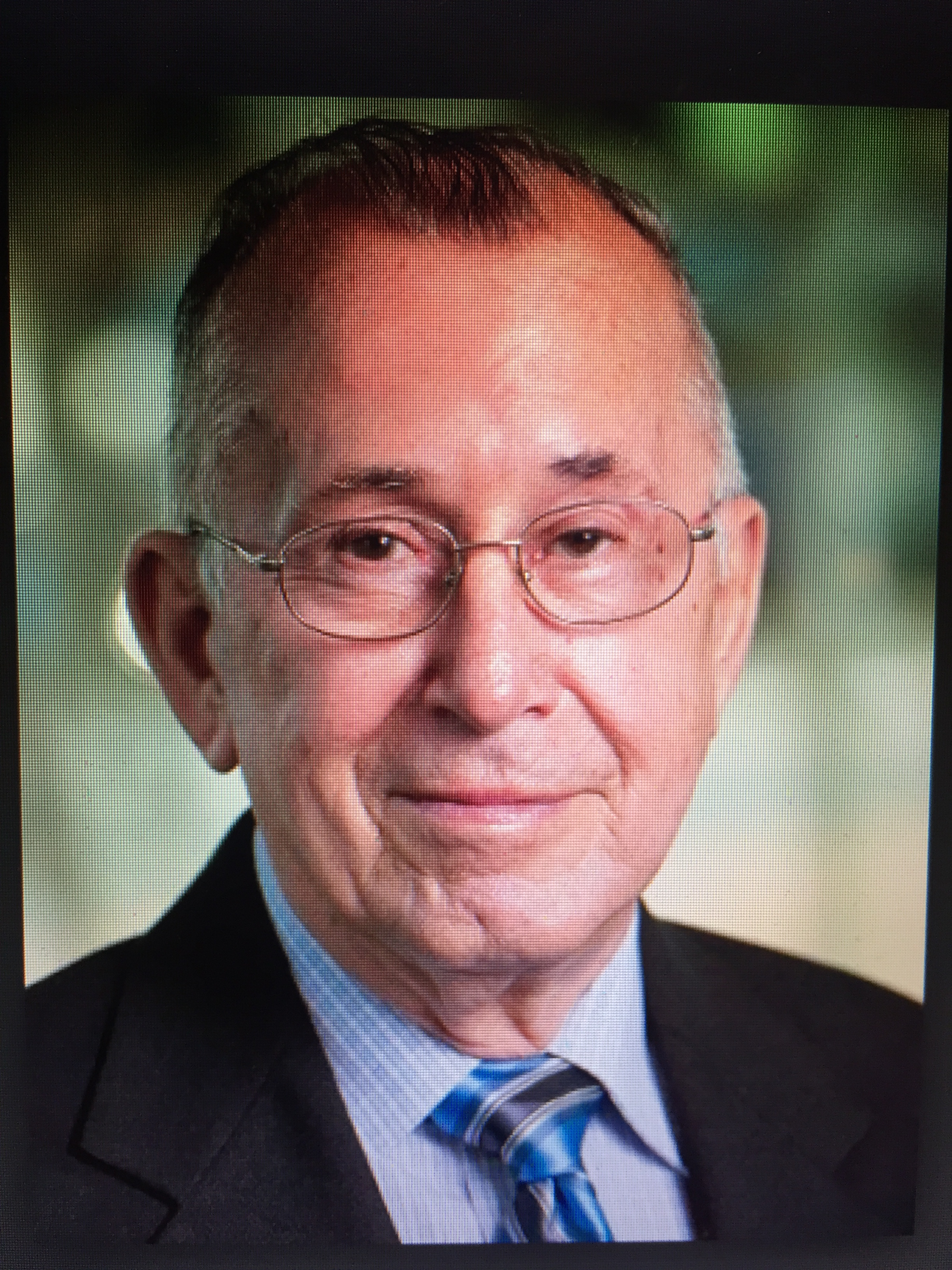
- Born: Daniel Nicholas Paul; December 5, 1938; Indian Brook 14, Nova Scotia, Canada
- Died: June 27, 2023 (aged 84)
- Education: Success Business College
- Occupations: Elder, author, columnist, activist

Daniel Nicholas Paul CM ONS (December 5, 1938 – June 27, 2023) was a Canadian Mi'kmaw elder, author, columnist, and human rights activist. Paul was perhaps best known as the author of the book We Were Not the Savages. Paul asserts that this book is the first such history ever written by a First Nations citizen. The book is seen as an important contribution to the North American Indian movement. One writer stated, "It's a Canadian version of Dee Brown's bestseller Bury My Heart at Wounded Knee and, as such, served a valuable purpose in raising public consciousness about Miꞌkmaq history, identity, and culture."

Among his many awards, Paul was conferred with the Order of Nova Scotia (ONS) in 2002 and appointed Member of the Order of Canada (CM) in 2005. He received from Université Sainte-Anne an honorary Doctor of Letters degree (1997). He had an honorary law degree from Dalhousie University (2013) and was the recipient of the Grand Chief Donald Marshall Memorial Elder Award (2007). He states: "High among the most appreciated honours that I've received during my career are the dozens of small items, Eagle Feathers, tobacco pouches, letters, mugs, etc., given and sent to me by students as thanks for helping them better understand the importance of according all Peoples human dignity and respect." During his active career, he has visited and lectured at most high schools, junior high schools, and elementary schools in Nova Scotia, several out of province, all universities in the Maritimes and at many others elsewhere in Canada and the United States. His brother Lawrence Paul is the former long-serving chief of Millbrook First Nation (1984–2012).

== Life ==
Prior to Paul's birth, his parents Sarah Agnes (née Noel), and William Gabriel, were relocated from Saint John, New Brunswick, to Indian Brook 14, Nova Scotia. Paul was born on December 5, 1938, at Indian Brook, as the eleventh of fourteen children. During his childhood, he earned money through selling the Star Weekly, Liberty Magazine, seeds, and greeting cards, and painted the interior of houses. He married Victoria Oakley; they had three children.

Paul attended the Indian Day School on Shubenacadie Indian Reserve to grade eight. He left home for Boston when he was fourteen and came face to face with the oddities of big-time city life for the first time. He laughs at his first memories of the adventure, saying good morning to all he encountered on the street and being fascinated by bag ladies (elderly women who lived on the streets with their possession in shopping bags). He returned to Nova Scotia in 1960 to attend Success Business College in Truro. He was mainly self-educated and asserted that he had at least a master's from the University of Life, possibly a Ph.D.

Paul's personal website lists his occupations since age 22, beginning as an accounts clerk in 1961 and employed by the Canadian department of Indian Affairs 1971–1986. From 1981 to 1986 he was the department's Nova Scotia District Superintendent of Lands, Revenues, Trusts, and Statutory Requirements.

A community activist, he was the founding Executive Director of the Confederacy of Mainland Micmacs (CMM) from 1986 to 1994, and while in this position, initiated fundraising for a new community centre for the Indian Brook Reserve and founded and published the Micmac/Maliseet Nations News. In addition to publishing duties he initially wrote editorials for the paper and much of its copy. During his tenure at CMM, Paul also started a trust fund for the Confederacy, which would support financing legal issues for the six bands associated with the organization. His leadership helped resolve the Afton Band's 170-year-old treaty claim to old Summerside property.

In addition, he worked to resolve land claims for the Pictou Landing Band. He has served on the Nova Scotia Human Rights Commission and on the Nova Scotia Department of Justice's Court Restructuring Task Force, among other provincial commissions, as a justice of the peace for the province, and has been a member of the Nova Scotia Police Review Board for over 20 years. He has also written bi-weekly op-eds for the Halifax Chronicle Herald newspaper.

On January 14, 2000, he received a millennium award from the city of Halifax for his contributions. In 2001, Paul was involved with a CBC documentary entitled Growing Up Native, and in Bear Paw Productions' (Eastern Tide's) Expulsion and the Bounty Hunter.

Paul died from cancer on June 27, 2023, at the age of 84.

== Author ==
Paul wrote numerous articles in newspapers and academic journals. He has written chapters for several books - two editions of the Mi'kmaq Anthology, Dawnland Voices, Living Treaties, Nova Scotia - Visions of the Future, and Power and Resistance. His novel Chief Lightning Bolt was published 2017, as was his biography by Jon Tattrie. His most well-known work is We Were Not the Savages, which is now in its fourth edition. Paul is critical of colonial historical accounts of the Mi’kmaq people:

"Because of their belief that European civilizations were superior, and therefore all others were inferior or savage, these writers reported the superior human rights practices of Amerindian civilization as if they were abnormal. Later, using these biased records as gospel, many White authors have written works about Mi'kmaq civilization that do not present a true picture. Their efforts were probably taken with sincerity and honesty, but many, if not all, are lacking in two respects: they ignore the Mi'kmaq perspective on civilization and fail to appreciate that the values of the two cultures were in most cases completely opposite... More contemporary authors who have written about Amerindian civilizations have also used European standards to evaluate the relative merits of these cultures. Thus their efforts are flawed."

Post-colonial historian Geoffrey Plank writes:

We Were Not the Savages is unique, in chronological scope and the story it tells, covering the last three centuries of Mi'kmaq history in detail. Prior to the appearance of this book [in 1993] it was common for historians to downplay or even deny the violence inflicted on the Mi'kmaq people by European and Euro-American colonizers. This work, more than any other piece of scholarly production, has headed off that consensus at a pass. Scalp-bounty prices are now recognized as a historical problem worthy of investigation. Finally, it is important to recognize that we have far too few histories written by Native American authors - very few indeed that cover as extensive a time span as this book does."

Many post-colonial historians, such as Thomas Naylor, applaud Paul's efforts to render visible the harms conducted toward the Mi'kmaq people by European colonizers. Naylor writes:

"Daniel N. Paul's We Were Not the Savages is a brilliant and painful account of how the Mi'kmaqs were treated by the Europeans. When will Canada and the United States begin paying reparations to Mi'kmaqs and other Tribes for what we did to them over the centuries? Daniel Paul makes a convincing case that the time is now! It is a fact-filled read that will make North Americans of European descent very uncomfortable. I highly recommend it."

== Controversy ==
Paul's assertions in his publications have caused controversy with numerous scholars of colonial history. Along with Paul, most contemporary scholars of the colonial period in Nova Scotia document the illegal means in which colonial authorities in Nova Scotia confiscated lands of the Mi'kmaq and other First Nations tribes. The work of these scholars has been used to address issues of legal reparation. There is also agreement among historians that bounties were placed on First Nations tribes during the period of frontier warfare during colonization, including the Mi'kmaq people. Paul's works have been cited as a key factor in highlighting the history of the bounty proclamations against Aboriginal tribes. In We Were Not the Savages, Paul outlines the history of the New England and Nova Scotia governors' use of scalping proclamations against the Mi'kmaq. He specifically quotes Massachusetts governor William Shirley's scalping proclamation of 1744, that of Cornwallis in 1749, and that of Nova Scotia governor Charles Lawrence in 1756. He also states that there is evidence some Mi'kmaq had even been targeted as early as in the governor of Massachusetts' scalping proclamation of 1694.

Virtually all historians agree that during frontier wars, bounties were placed on the Mi'kmaq, with settlers who brought in scalps being financially compensated for doing so. In contrast to these scholars, however, Paul asserts that the Mi'kmaq leaders did not employ such tactics against the settlers in defense of their traditional lands. He states that the renegade Mi'kmaq who did participate in such "crimes" were "mercenaries acting beyond the authority of their leaders", who were doing "dirty work" for the French. Paul asserts the people who acted "savagely" were primarily those of European descent - not the Mi'kmaq.

Historians Geoffrey Plank and Stephen Patterson, however, offer evidence that indicates some of the Mi'kmaq leadership did support frontier warfare against Protestant families, such as Chief Jean-Baptiste Cope. Further, Edward Cornwallis' decision to put a bounty on the Mi'kmaq was not based simply on the 1749 Raid on Dartmouth that immediately preceded it. Historian John G. Reid's work indicates that by the time Cornwallis had arrived in Halifax in 1749, there was a long history of the Wabanaki Confederacy (which included the Mi'kmaq) killing European settlers along the New England-Acadia border in Maine during conflict. (See the Northeast Coast Campaigns 1688, 1703, 1723, 1724, 1745.) Grenier indicates that frontier warfare against families was the standard practice by all parties through the six colonial wars which started in 1688 (see the four French and Indian Wars, Father Rale's War, and Father Le Loutre's War).

Along with challenging Paul's assertion that the Mi'kmaq leadership did not use the standard warfare practice of the period, historians have also disagreed with Paul labeling the Mi'kmaq frontier wars as a "genocide" of the Mi'kmaq. Post-colonial historian John G. Reid states, "I believe (genocide) is essentially a 20th-century term, and I'm not sure that it's the best way to understand 18th-century realities... What happened in the 18th century is a process of imperial expansion that was ruthless at times, that cost lives…. But to my mind, you can't just transfer concepts between centuries." Kyle Matthews, the lead researcher at the Montreal Institute For Genocide and Human Rights Studies, states, "The word 'genocide' is today used by anybody, at any time — some people use it to get media attention or to support a cause," he said. "I think that’s a real problem."

In response to these challenges to his work, Paul writes that most objections to his work come from 'Caucasians', and that "[i]t's understandable they try to minimize the horrors their ancestors committed." Paul also asserts that his work is largely responsible for the removal of the names of colonial figure's from Nova Scotian landmarks who were involved in frontier warfare against the Mi'kmaq. In We Were Not..., he mentions his participation in a successful 1998 campaign to change the name of a Nova Scotia highway that had been named after New England Ranger John Gorham. Paul's efforts have also led to the removal of the name "Cornwallis" from a junior high in Halifax, Nova Scotia. He has also advocated for the removal of the Edward Cornwallis Statue in Halifax.

While applauding the strengths of Paul's work, others have lamented that Paul continues the tradition perpetuated by Canadian historians of downplaying certain actions of the Mi'kmaq militia during their resistance against European colonization. Many have claimed that Paul omits many accounts of the Mi'kmaq using standard tactics of warfare used during the colonial period (such as killing civilians) and labels the Mi'kmaq warriors who did as "mercenaries" and "criminals". Reid remarks that Paul's work "undoubtedly traveled further down the road of engaged history and even participant history than many other historians would be comfortable in going…"

== We Were Not the Savages ==
In Paul's book, he addresses numerous issues. One of these is the validity of the Treaty of 1752 and the importance of Jean-Baptiste Cope in the maritime history of the Americas.

=== Treaty of 1752 ===
Paul praised Chief Jean-Baptiste Cope for negotiating the November 1752 Peace and Friendship Treaty with the Crown, "in a desperate attempt to prevent the complete annihilation of his people". According to historian William Wicken, the only written evidence connecting Cope with the treaty is his signing the treaty on behalf of ninety Mi’kmaq at Shubenacadie. Furthermore, these historians suggest no other Mi’kmaq leaders would endorse the treaty and that Cope himself tore it up six months after the treaty was ratified. The Crown did not formally renounce the Treaty until 1756.

Despite the short-term fate of the 1752 peace treaty with hostilities continuing soon afterward, some Nova Scotians continue to celebrate the signing of it annually on Treaty Day. As Paul also notes, in 1985, the Supreme Court of Canada finally affirmed and recognized its validity In this case, the Crown prosecutors argued that Cope had violated the treaty, which, in turn, made it null and void. Paul asserts, in contrast, that it was the Crown who violated the treaty - not the Mi'kmaq. In his book, Paul cites in extenso a journal entered under oath by eyewitness Anthony Casteel regarding a resumption of hostilities the following spring, and concludes by noting: "[i]n the 1980s, descendants of the [European settlers], (i.e., the Crown) attempted to nullify the Treaty of 1752 in the courts by claiming that Chief Jean Baptiste Cope had violated the terms of the treaty during the Casteel incident. But they conveniently overlooked the facts that [the Crown], by their refusal to prosecute two murderers [involved in the Attack at Mocodome], [were] in clear violation of the treaty and that Chief Cope had had very little involvement in the [Casteel] affair."

== See also ==
- Canadian Who's Who - Paul was entered in the publication in 2004
