= Attack at Jeddore =

1753 battle

Coordinates: 44.75°N 63.03°W

The Attack at Jeddore happened on May 19, 1753, off Jeddore, Nova Scotia, during Father Le Loutre's War. The Mi'kmaq killed nine of the British delegates and spared the life of the French-speaking translator Anthony Casteel, who wrote one of the few captivity narratives that exist from Acadia and Nova Scotia.

== Historical context ==
Following the British Conquest of Acadia in 1710, Nova Scotia remained primarily occupied by Catholic Acadians and Mi'kmaq. By the time Cornwallis had arrived in Halifax, there was a long history of the Wabanaki Confederacy (which included the Mi'kmaq) resisting British colonial encroachment by launching raids on their settlements along the New England/ Acadia border in Maine (See the Northeast Coast Campaigns 1688, 1703, 1723, 1724, 1745, 1746, 1747). On 22 November 1752, after several years of fighting, the leader of the Shubenacadie Mi'kmaq village under the chief Jean-Baptiste Cope reached a peace agreement with Nova Scotia Governor Peregrine Hopson in Halifax. Cope did not speak on behalf off all the Mi'kmaq people. Most of the other Mi'kmaq people, even those in his local community, denounced the treaty.

The Attack at Mocodome occurred on February 21, 1753, when two English died and six or seven Mi'kmaq. Both sides blamed each other for the incident. In response, Cope requested time, political support, and presents to distribute to his compatriots as tokens of British respect. In response to Cope's invitation, a delegation of 9 soldiers and one translator left Halifax in a sloop under the command of Bannerman to sail east to meet a group of Mi'kmaq leaders that Cope had assembled. They planned to exchange presents and advance the negotiations for an expansion of the peace.

== Attack ==
On the night of May 18, the British delegation met Jean-Baptiste Cope at the mouth of a river at Jeddore, in which there was a Mi'kmaq village up stream. They slept overnight and the next day four Mi'kmaq men and one woman, Cope not among them, came to the ship. They invited Captain Bannerman to come to get provisions from the village. The captain followed their directions, and sailed up stream into an ambush.

A team of warriors seized the delegation and took it to the Mi'kmaq village on the bank of the river. Casteel reported the Mi'kmaq killed Captain James Bannerman and the other eight British in front of him. He reported that he watched the warriors cure and mount the scalps of his companions. (One month later at Chignecto, Le Loutre paid Mi'kmaq warriors 1800 livres for eighteen British scalps.) Chief Étienne Bâtard was among the Mi'kmaq and is reported to have helped save Casteel.

Casteel reported that Cope burned the treaty that was signed less than six months earlier. The Mi'kmaq ransomed Anthony Casteel to the French and let him off at Port Toulouse, where the Mi'kmaq sank the schooner after looting it.

== Consequences ==
According to historian Geoffery Plank, this incident reminded the British that individuals were not always what they seemed:

A Mi'kmaq leader offering peace might in fact be an agent of the French Empire. A dutiful messenger and interpreter might be an ally of the Mi'kmaq or the French. An invitation to negotiations, or any offer of assistance, might be a ploy, and lead to a fatal ambush. Casteel helped confirm the Nova Scotia Council in their belief that the Mi'kmaq resistance was continuing to work closely with the French military, Catholic missionaries, and the Acadians.

Despite the collapse of peace on the eastern shore, the British did not formally renounce the Treaty of 1752 until 1756, when Lawrence declared created another proclamation. Even more fuel was given to the conflict when the British establish Lunenburg, Nova Scotia in May 1753.
