= Raid on Dartmouth (1751) =

Killing of British villagers and soldiers during Father Le Loutre's War

- Part of Father Le Loutre's War
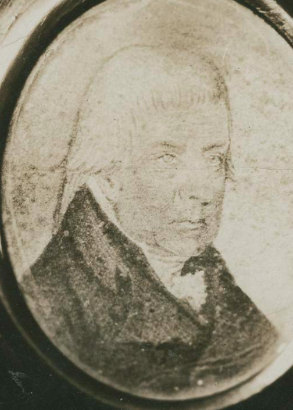
- John George Pyke, Only image of survivor of the Raid on Dartmouth (1751)
Date	May 13, 1751
Location	Dartmouth, Nova Scotia 44°41′34.5″N 63°36′0″W
Result	Acadian and Mi'kmaq victory

Belligerents
Mi'kmaq militia Acadian militia	British America

Commanders and leaders
Joseph Broussard (Beausoleil)	Captain William Clapham; Lt. Clark, Warburton's Regiment (wounded); Sgt. ?, 45th Regiment †; Superior officer ?, 45th Regiment †; Captain Thomas Stannard (taken prisoner)

Strength
60 Acadian and Mi'kmaq	60 British regulars and rangers

Casualties and losses
disputed: Cornwallis: 6 Mi'kmaq; Salusbury: one or two Mi'kmaq	disputed: Cornwallis: 4 killed; 6 prisoners; Wilson's journal: 15 killed, 7 wounded (3 die in hospital), 6 prisoners; Salusbury journal: 20 killed; London Magazine: 8 settlers and a few officers killed, 14 prisoners

The Raid on Dartmouth (also referred to as the Dartmouth Massacre) occurred during Father Le Loutre's War on May 13, 1751, when a Mi'kmaq and Acadian militia from Chignecto, under the command of Acadian Joseph Broussard, raided Dartmouth, Nova Scotia, destroying the town and killing twenty British villagers and wounding British regulars. The town was protected by a blockhouse on Blockhouse Hill (close to the corner of King St. and North St.) with William Clapham's Rangers and British regulars from the 45th Regiment of Foot. This raid was one of seven Miꞌkmaq and Acadians would conduct against the town during the war.

== Historical context ==
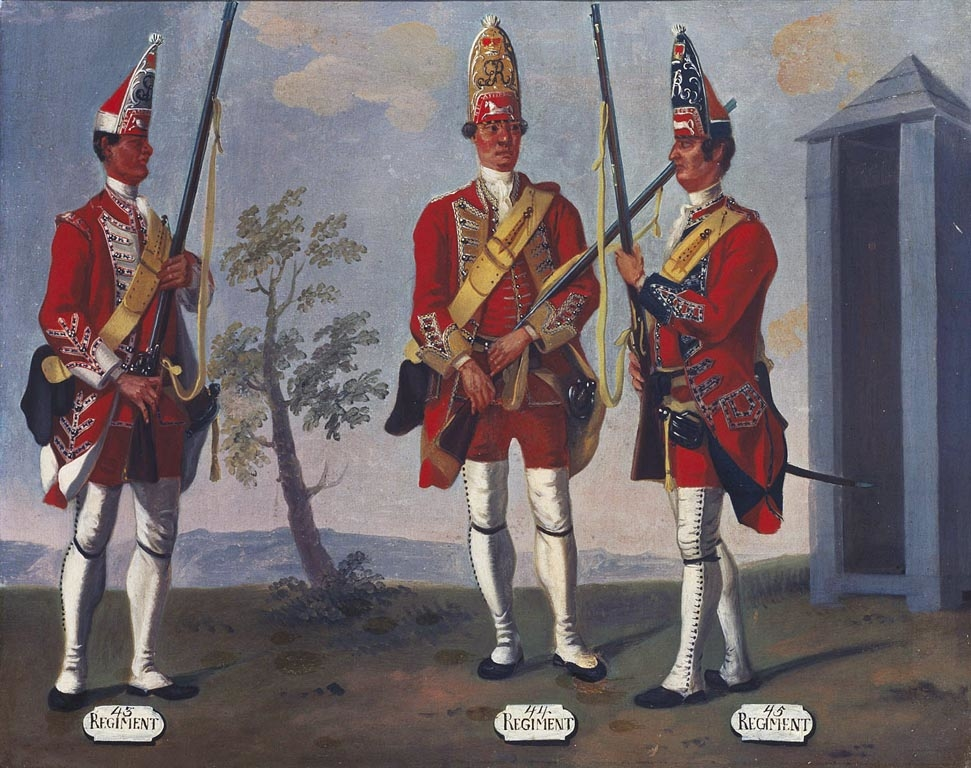
45th Regiment of Foot (right) was stationed in Dartmouth during the Raid.

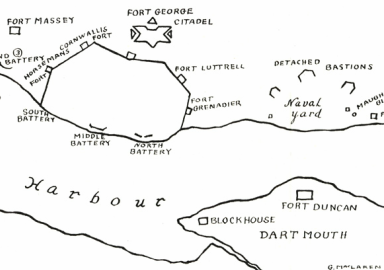
Blockhouse overlooking Dartmouth Cove

After the British Conquest of Acadia in 1710, the British laid claim to all of peninsular Acadia, renaming it Nova Scotia. Its population was primarily Catholic French Acadians and the Mi'kmaq. The Mi'kmaq never ceded this land by treaty or surrender. In response to British settlement, the Mi'kmaq raided the early British settlements of present-day Shelburne (1715) and Canso (1720), prior to entering into a Peace and Friendship Treaty with the British in 1726.

A generation later, Father Le Loutre's War began when Edward Cornwallis arrived to establish Halifax with 13 transports on June 21, 1749. By the time Cornwallis had arrived in Halifax, there was a long history of the Wabanaki Confederacy (which included the Mi'kmaq) defending themselves from British encroachment and invasion along the New England/Acadia border in Maine (See the Northeast Coast Campaigns 1688, 1703, 1723, 1724, 1745, 1746, 1747).

The British quickly began to build other settlements. To guard against Mi'kmaq, Acadian and French attacks on the new Protestant settlements, British fortifications were erected in Halifax (Citadel Hill) (1749), Bedford (Fort Sackville) (1749), Dartmouth (1750), Lunenburg (1753) and Lawrencetown (1754). There were numerous Mi'kmaq and Acadian raids on these villages such as the Raid on Dartmouth (1751).

There was a raid on those in the Dartmouth area in 1749. In response to the raid, Governor Edward Cornwallis issued an extirpation proclamation against the Miꞌkmaq on peninsular Nova Scotia and those that supported them. To carry out this task, two companies of rangers were raised, one led by Captain Francis Bartelo and the other by Captain William Clapham. These two companies served alongside that of John Gorham's company. The three companies scoured the land around Halifax unsuccessfully looking for Mi'kmaq.

In July 1750, the Mi'kmaq killed and scalped seven men who were at work in Dartmouth. In August 1750, 353 people arrived on the ship Alderney and began the town of Dartmouth. The town was laid out in the autumn of that year. The following month, on September 30, 1750, Dartmouth was attacked again by the Miꞌkmaq and five more residents were killed. In October 1750 a group of about eight men went out "to take their diversion; and as they were fowling, they were attacked by the Indians, who took the whole prisoners; scalped ... [one] with a large knife, which they wear for that purpose, and threw him into the sea ..."

In March 1751, the Mi'kmaq attacked on two more occasions, bringing the total number of raids to six in the previous two years.

== Raid ==
Three months later, on May 13, 1751 before sunrise, Joseph Broussard led sixty Mi'kmaq and Acadians to attack Dartmouth again, in what would be known as the "Dartmouth Massacre". The raiding party came down the Shuebenacadie River from Chignecto. Broussard and the others killed twenty settlers and more were taken prisoner. Captain William Clapham and sixty soldiers of Hugh Warburton's regiment were on duty and fired from the blockhouse, which was located at the point overlooking Dartmouth Cove. The raiding party tortured and mutilated the sergeant and wounded three other soldiers.

Captain Alexander Murray along with about 40 soldiers left Halifax in three vessels and tried to track them down for miles but most of the raiding party had dispersed. The British reported they had killed six Mi'kmaq warriors, but were only able to retrieve one scalp that they took to Halifax. Those at a camp at Dartmouth Cove, led by John Wisdom, assisted the settlers. Upon returning to their camp the next day they found the Mi'kmaq had also raided their camp and taken a prisoner.

The Mi'kmaq scalped all the settlers. The British took what remained of the bodies to Halifax for burial in the Old Burying Ground. (John George Pyke survived the raid but his father John Abraham did not.)

== Aftermath ==
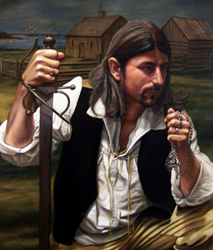
Joseph Broussard, known as "Beausoleil"

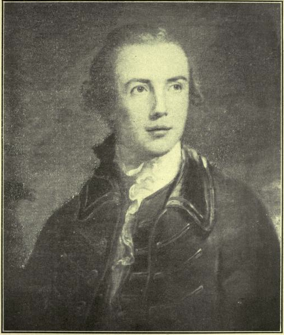
Captain Alexander Murray

The British retaliated by sending several armed companies to Chignecto. A few French defenders were killed and the dikes were breached. Hundreds of acres of crops were ruined which was disastrous for the Acadians and the French troops.

Immediately after the raid, a wooden palisade was erected around the town plot. A court martial was called on 14 May, the day after the raid, to inquire into the conduct of the commanding officers who allowed the town to be destroyed. In June, Clapham's sergeant was acquitted.

Mi'kmaq and Acadian attacks continued throughout the French and Indian War which ended fourteen years after Dartmouth was first settled. (For example, in the spring of 1759, there was another attack on Fort Clarence, in which five soldiers were killed.) After the initial raid, no new settlers were placed in Dartmouth again for the next thirty years. Of the 383 settlers who arrived in Dartmouth on the Alderney in August 1750, only half remained two years later. By the end of war (1763), Dartmouth was only left with 78 settlers.

Similar raids happened in response to the British founding of Lawrencetown and Lunenburg, Nova Scotia, such as the Raid on Lunenburg (1756).

== Fiction ==
Joseph Howe lived in Dartmouth and was well acquainted with its history. He included a Mi'kmaw raid on a British dwelling in his poem "Acadia".

== See also ==
- List of massacres in Canada
- Military history of Nova Scotia
- History of the Halifax Regional Municipality
- Military history of the Acadians
