= Northeast Coast campaign (1755) =

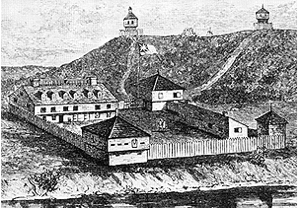
Fort Halifax (Maine)

The Northeast Coast campaign of 1755 occurred toward the end of Father Le Loutre's War and the beginning of the French and Indian War, in which the Wabanaki Confederacy of Acadia raided the British communities along the former border of New England and Acadia in present-day Maine.

== Historical context ==
In response to the Gorham's Rangers's raid on the St. John River in 1748, the Governor of Canada threatened to support native raids along the northern New England border. There were many previous raids from the Mi'kmaq militia and Maliseet Militias against British settlers on the border (1703, 1723, 1724, 1745, 1746, 1747). During the war, along the former border of Acadia, the Kennebec River, the British built Fort Halifax (Winslow), Fort Shirley (Dresden, formerly Frankfurt) and Fort Western (Augusta).

Fort Halifax was completed on September 4 and the raids on the fort began on November 6, 1754. Wabanaki killed and scalped one soldier and took four others captive. In response, Governor Shirley sent 100 more troops to the fort.

== Campaign ==
Months before the siege of Beausejour, Wabanaki conducted 9 raids in the 1755 campaign against the British forts and settlements along the border. In this campaign, there were nine raids; the natives killed 11 and took 11 captive. Natives killed two men and a family in Gorhamtown in April 1755. The Natives then attacked New Boston (Gray), burning the plantations. On May 13, they killed two men at Frankfort (Dresden) – site of Fort Shirley. They captured five men in the fields at Sheepscot (Newcastle), two of whom eventually escaped. On May 29, they killed one person and took another prisoner in North Yarmouth. In June, they shot one man at Terconnet. They captured one person en route from Fort Western under the command of James Howard, to Fort Halifax, unders the command of William Lithgow. They took two prisoners at Fort Shirley (Dresen) and another two captured at New Gloucester.

== Afterward ==
In response to the campaign, on June 10 Governor Shirley ordered additional supplies and six independent companies to the border. On June 11, Shirley declared war against the Anasaunticook Indians and all other Eastern tribes (except the Penobscot). The stunning defeat at Beausejour on 16 June resulted in the Natives withdrawing from warfare on the border.

John Wheelwright (military officer) of Wells took over the munitions of the war for the border region and procured supplies for the Kennebec expedition.
