= John Connor (mariner) =

Canadian mariner in Nova Scotia

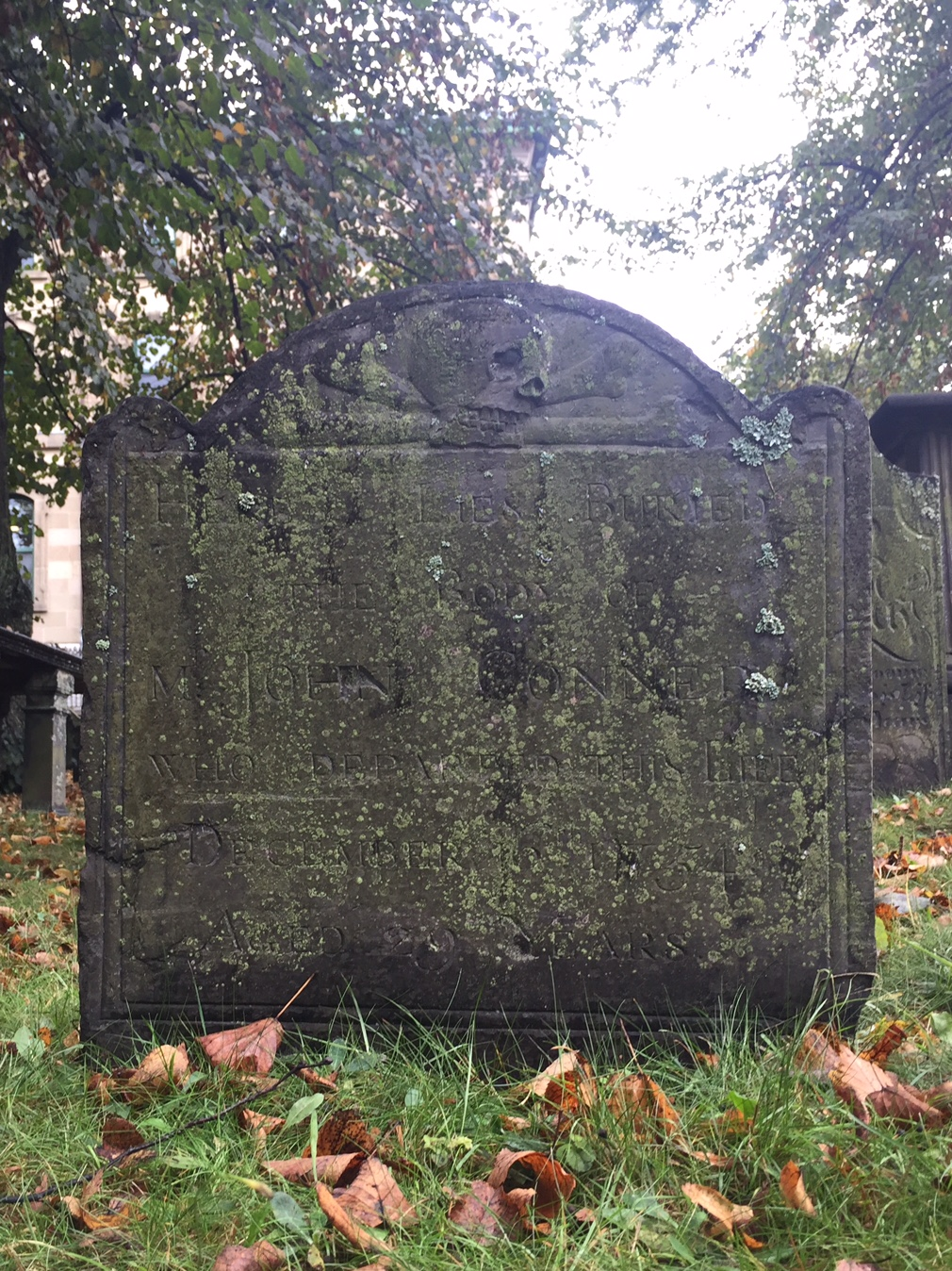
John Connor, Old Burying Ground (Halifax, Nova Scotia)

John Connor (1728 – 16 December 1757) was a mariner who ran the first ferry in Halifax Harbour, Nova Scotia, and was involved in the Attack at Mocodome during Father Le Loutre’s War, which effectively ended the Treaty of 1752.

Connor arrived unaccompanied on the Merry Jacks in 1749 with Edward Cornwallis. He was awarded the contract to operate the Halifax Harbour ferry service in December 1750. He later moved to Dartmouth. The Mi'kmaq killed Connor's pregnant wife Mary and daughter Martha in the Raid on Dartmouth (1751). In February 1752, by the order of the Nova Scotia Council, Connor's contract to operate the ferry in Halifax Harbour was extended for three years by the order of the Nova Scotia Council. On 22 December 1752 he assigned his ferry operation to two other mariners.

He was later involved in the attack at Mocodome. Connor reported he killed the Mikmaq to escape captivity. He did not kill them for a bounty because there was no bounty at the time of the attack. Mi'kmaq oral tradition suggest that his involvement in the Attack at Mocodome was an act of revenge for the killing of his family in Dartmouth. The July 1752 census indicates that John Connor was living within the town of Halifax with two adult males and one adult female.

On 16 December 1757, Connor died during the French and Indian War at age 29 and was buried at the Old Burial Ground.

== Legacy ==
- namesake of Connor Street, Dartmouth, Nova Scotia

== Bibliography ==
- Akins, Thomas B. (1895). History of Halifax city. Halifax: Nova Scotia Historical Society. ISBN 978-0-88812-001-4.
- Awalt, Don (2004). "The Mi'kmaq and Point Pleasant Park" (PDF). www.pointpleasantpark.ca. Archived from the original (PDF) on 2015-09-24.
- Lawson, William (1893). History of the townships of Dartmouth, Preston and Lawrencetown, Halifax county, N.S. Halifax: Morton. ISBN 978-0-665-09015-8.
- Wicken, William C. (2002). Mi'kmaq Treaties on Trial: History, Land and Donald Marshall Junior. University of Toronto Press. ISBN 978-0-8020-7665-6.
- Harris, Reginald Vanderbilt (1949). The Church of Saint Paul in Halifax, Nova Scotia, 1749-1949. Ryerson Press.
- Mackenzie, Shelagh; Robson, Scott, eds. (2004). Halifax street names: an illustrated guide (2nd ed.). Halifax: Formac Pub. Co. ISBN 978-0-88780-652-0.
