= Fort Menaskoux =

Coordinates: 43.8494°N 69.7883°W

Fort Menaskoux (previously known as Newtown Fort) was a British colonial fort in present-day Arrowsic, Maine.

== Early settlements on Arrowsic Island ==
The first major settlement on Arrowsic Island, located east of the Kennebec River and west of the Sasanoa River in what is now southern Maine, was established by Major Thomas Clarke and Captain Thomas Lake in the 1650s. Located in the north of the island on the banks of the Sasanoa, Clarke and Lake operated an extensive business and a small community, engaging in fishing, lumbering, the raising of cattle, and trade with the local Native Americans.

On August 14, 1676, during King Philip's War, the Clarke and Lake settlement was attacked and destroyed by a band of Native Americans. The evening before, an Indian woman appeared at the door of the Clarke and Lake fort seeking shelter. She was admitted, and in the dead of night quietly opened the gate. In rushed warriors, and in the massacre which followed, 30 colonists were either killed and scalped or taken into captivity. Captain Thomas Lake, Sylvanus Davis and two others seized a canoe and paddled to Parker's Island (now Georgetown), where all but Lake escaped alive from their pursuers. As the warehouse was looted and village burned to ashes, a brave sported the captain's hat. The Clarke and Lake settlement site is now of archaeological interest.

In 1679 Sir Edmund Andros, governor of the Province of New York, established a township called Newtown on the southern part of the island, to further a New York claim to the area. It was laid out with a common and, by order of the governor in 1688, a small, square palisaded fort named Fort Newtown was built on the ridge at the southern end of the island. But King William's War broke out in May 1689, and by July, Newtown was destroyed and abandoned.

== Construction of Fort Menaskoux ==
Signed in 1713, the Treaty of Portsmouth brought a truce between the Eastern (Abenaki) Indians and English settlements. Newtown was reestablished in 1714, then incorporated in 1716 as Georgetown-on-Arrowsic, named after King George I. Eventually, the town's boundaries were extended to include Parker's Island, Stage Island and the Plantation of Nequasset (present-day Georgetown, Phippsburg, Bath, West Bath and Woolwich).

During this time Fort Menaskoux was built and Samuel Penhallow was the commander. Beginning on August 9, 1717, Massachusetts Governor Samuel Shute and Panhallow conducted a two-day conference on Arrowsic with delegates of various tribes, who arrived in a flotilla of canoes and encamped on Lee Island opposite the town. They objected to so many English forts in their territory, and Shute responded that he would build them wherever he thought necessary. Incidentally, the governor's boat Squirrel ran aground on what has been known since as Squirrel Point. All the Indians helped him get free.

There was also a conference held with the Eastern Indians at the fort on August 11, 1718.

=== Raids in Dummer's War ===
In the summer of 1723 during Dummer's War, Arrowsic was attacked by the Norridgewocks and their 250 Indian allies from Canada during the Northeast Coast Campaign. Incited by French missionary Sebastien Rale, they burned 37 dwellings and killed 300 cattle. The 40 inhabitants fled to the garrison, with only a child lost. When the fort could not be taken, the Indians disappeared upriver. The village was attacked again in 1724.

=== 1758 raid ===
During the French and Indian War, on June 9, 1758,a band of Natives shot Ebenezer Preble and a workman as they tended his farm on the northern end of the island. They then attacked his garrison, killing his wife and carrying away their 5 children to be sold as servants in Canada. It would be the last Indian attack on the Kennebec River; next year brought the Fall of Quebec. On February 17, 1841, Arrowsic Island was set off from Georgetown and incorporated as the town of Arrowsic.
