= Samuel Penhallow =

Cornish American colonist and historian (1665–1726)

Samuel Penhallow (July 2, 1665 – December 2, 1726) was a Cornish colonist, historian, and militia leader in present-day Maine during Queen Anne's War and Dummer's War. He was the commander at Fort Menaskoux and was attacked during the Northeast Coast Campaign (1724).

== Life ==
Coat of Arms of Samuel Penhallow

Penhallow was born at St Mabon, Cornwall, England on July 2, 1665. From 1683 to 1686 he attended a school at Newington Green (near London) conducted by the Rev. Charles Morton (1627–1698), a dissenting clergyman, with whom he emigrated to Massachusetts in 1686. He was commissioned by the Society for the Propagation of the Gospel in New England to study the Indian languages and to preach to the Indians; but he was soon diverted from this work.

Removing to Portsmouth, New Hampshire, he there married Mary Cutt, a daughter of John Cutt (1625–1681), president of the Province of New Hampshire in 1679, a successful merchant and mill-owner, and thus came into possession of considerable property (including much of the present site of Portsmouth). In 1700 he was speaker of the Assembly and in 1702 became a member of the Provincial Council, but was suspended by Lieutenant-Governor George Vaughan (1676–1724). Penhallow, however, was sustained by Governor Samuel Shute (1662–1742), and Vaughan was removed from office in 1716.

In 1714 Penhallow was appointed a justice of the superior court of judicature, and from 1717 until his death was chief justice of that court; and he also served as treasurer of the province in 1699–1726, and as Secretary of the province in 1714–1726. He died at Portsmouth on December 2, 1726.

== Works ==
- Penhallow, Samuel; Adams, Nathaniel; Colman, Benjamin (1859). History of the Wars of New-England with the Eastern Indians, or a Narrative of their Continued Perfidy and Cruelty. Philadelphia: Reprinted ... for Wm. Dodge, by J. Harpel.
- Penhallow's Indian Wars; A Facsimile Reprint of the First Edition, Printed in Boston in 1726
