= Means massacre =

- Location: 43°50′11″N 70°03′01″W; Flying Point, North Yarmouth, Province of Massachusetts Bay
- Date: May 10, 1756 (270 years ago)
- Target: Means family
- Deaths: 2
- Perpetrator: Native Americans

On May 10, 1756, the Means family of North Yarmouth, Province of Massachusetts Bay (today's Freeport, Maine), were attacked by Native Americans during the French and Indian War. It resulted in the deaths of two people.

Although warning had been given about an Indian raid being in progress in the area, with the recommendation that outlying settlers should shelter in their nearest garrison house, the Means family decided to wait until the morning to go to Flying Point. They lived in a log cabin located near the shoreline, and the family consisted of 33-year-old farmer Thomas, his wife of seven years, Alice, daughters Alice and Jane, an infant son, Robert, and 16-year-old Molly (Mary), sister of the patriarch. Alice was pregnant with a second son, named Thomas at birth.

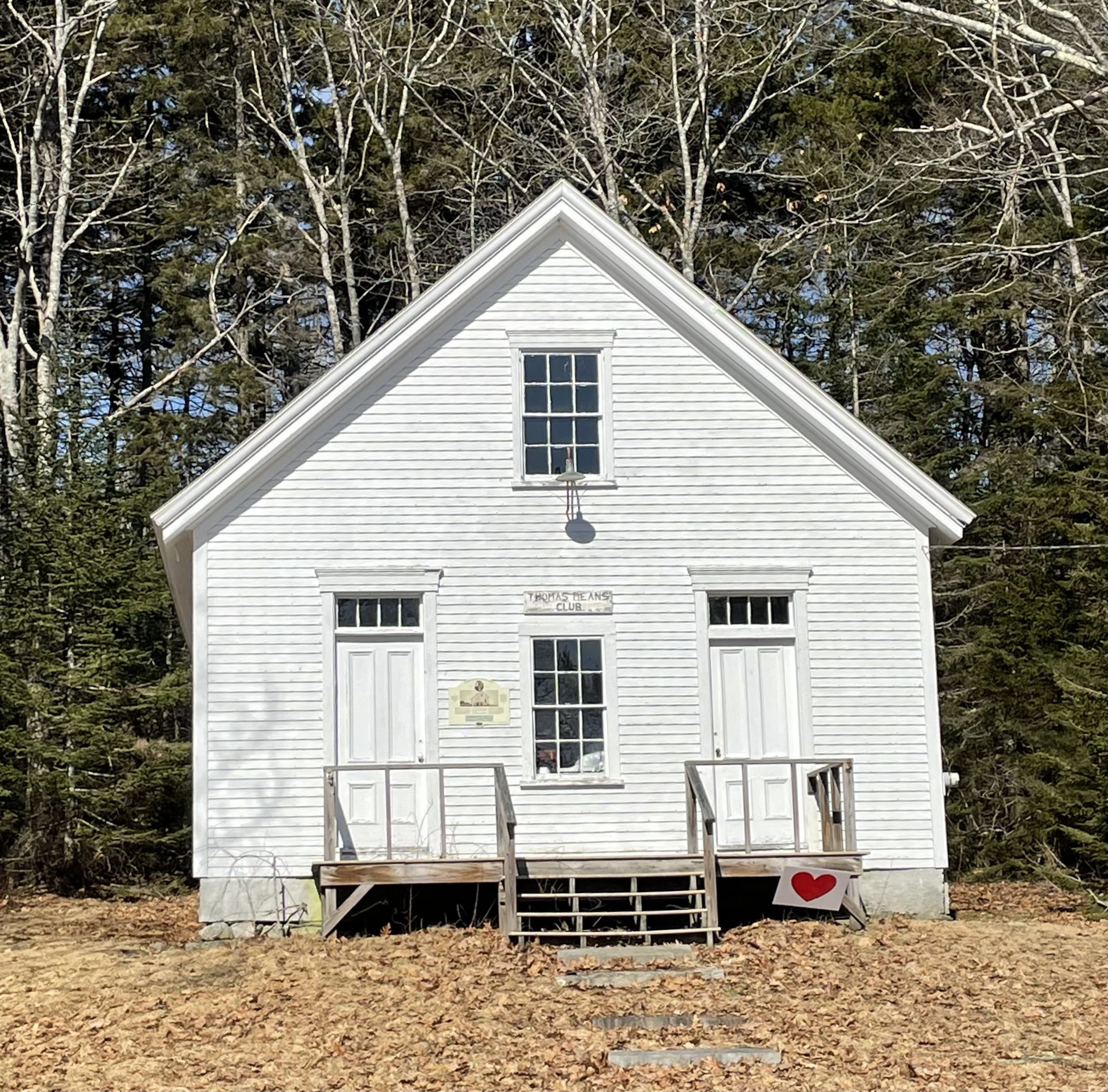
Thomas Means Club, Freeport, Maine

Shortly after dawn, the family was dragged out of their home. Thomas was shot and scalped. Alice, carrying her baby, ran back into the house and barricaded the door. One of the attackers shot through a hole in the wall, killing the infant and puncturing his mother's breast. John Martin, who had been sleeping in another room, fired at them, causing them to flee.

The Indians took with them Molly, whom they made follow them through the woods to Canada. Upon her arrival in Quebec, she was sold as a slave. A few months later, Captain William McLellan, of Falmouth, Maine (now Portland), was in Quebec in charge of a group of prisoners for exchange. He had known Molly before her capture and secretly arranged for her escape. He came below her window and threw her a rope which she slid down. McLellan brought her back to Falmouth on his vessel. They married shortly afterwards. Another source states that McLellan knew, at the time of her kidnap, that Mary would be taken to Quebec and tracked her down when he arrived there.

Alice remarried, to Colonel George Rogers. Thomas is interred in Freeport's First Parish Cemetery, alongside his son. His wife is buried with her second husband in Flying Point Cemetery. His daughter, Alice, is buried at Old Harpswell Common Burying Ground, alongside her husband, Clement Skolfield, whom she married in 1773. Jane married Joseph Anderson, of Flying Point.

The Means massacre was the last act of violence by the indigenous people to occur within the limits of North Yarmouth.

Thomas Means was born in December 1756, a few months after the death of his father and brother, in the garrison house at Flying Point. He went on to achieve the rank of major in the Continental Army. He died in 1828, aged 71 or 72, and is buried in Flying Point Cemetery.

In 1932, a reenactment of the event was held in front of a large audience. Nearly all of the actors were descended from one of the Meanses involved.

In July and August 2006, an exhibition commemorating the event was on view at Freeport's Harrington House, now the home of Freeport Historical Society.

A nearby one-room former schoolhouse is named the Thomas Means Club in memory of the family's patriarch.
