= William McLellan (sea captain) =

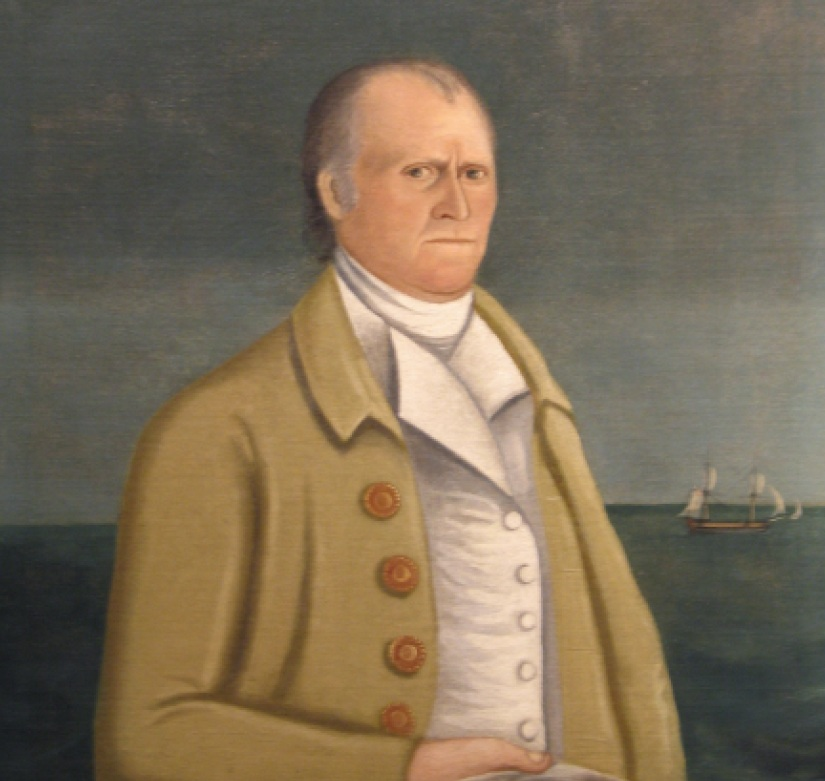
- McLellan c. 1800, by John Brewster
- Born: November 21, 1735
- Died: July 28, 1815 (aged 79)
- Occupation: Sea captain

William McLellan (November 21, 1735 – July 28, 1815) was an American merchant sea captain. He was owner and master of the sloop Centurian, which was one of the vessels destroyed at the hands of the British during the Penobscot Expedition in 1779, part of the American Revolutionary War.

After the war, McLellan became a prominent merchant in Portland, Maine.

== Early life ==
McLellan was born on November 21, 1735, the son of Bryce McLellan, an Irish weaver who emigrated to Falmouth, Maine (now Portland), in the early 18th century.

== Rescue of Mary Means ==
In 1756, Native Americans attacked the Means family, who lived at Flying Point, near today's Freeport, Maine. The family consisted of Thomas, his wife Alice, daughters Alice and Jane, an infant son, Robert, and Molly (Mary) Finney, sister of the patriarch and aged about sixteen. The family was dragged out of their home. Thomas was shot and scalped. Mother and baby ran back into the house and barricaded the door. One of the attackers shot through a hole in the wall, killing the infant and puncturing his mother's breast. John Martin, who had been sleeping in another room, fired at them, causing them to flee. They took with them Molly, whom they made follow them through the woods to Canada. Upon her arrival in Quebec, she was sold as a slave. A few months later, McLellan was in Quebec in charge of a group of prisoners for exchange. He had known Molly before her capture and secretly arranged for her escape. He came below her window and threw her a rope which she slid down. McLellan brought her back to Falmouth on his vessel. They married shortly afterwards, but Molly died in 1764 at the age of 23 or 24.

Another source states that McLellan knew, at the time of her kidnap, that Mary would be taken to Quebec and tracked her down when he arrived there.

== Haiti massacre ==
In 1791, McLellan and Asa Clapp were witnesses to the massacre of the white population of Haiti at the outset of the Haitian Revolution.

== Personal life ==
McLellan married four times: firstly to Mary Means, then Mary Phinney, Jane Jameson and Betty Dilworth.

One of McLellan's sons, William Jr. (1776–1844), was also a sea captain. One of his vessels was the brig HMS Boxer during its time in mercantile service.

His other children included Harriet and George. Each of his three known children were borne by his third wife.

=== Death ===
McLellan died on July 28, 1815, aged 79. He is interred in Portland's Eastern Cemetery, as are each of his wives.
