= Northeast Coast campaign (1712) =

The Northeast Coast campaign involved the Wabanaki Confederacy raiding British villages along the former border of Acadia in present-day Maine during Queen Anne's War in the spring and summer of 1712.

== Historical context ==
After the Northeast Coast campaign (1703), in the spring of 1704, after the Raid on Deerfield in February, the Wabanaki again attacked Wells and York, Maine. They raided Saco, Maine again in 1704 and 1705. They raided Winter Harbor (in present-day Biddeford near Biddeford Pool), two more times in 1707 and 1710.

The raids on British villages was in retaliation to their capture of the capital of Acadia, Port Royal, which the British renamed Annapolis Royal.

== Campaign ==
Natives made raids on Kittery, Wells, Berwick, York, Spruce Creek, Portsmouth. The campaign also reached into New Hampshire and Massachusetts with native raids on Exeter, Oyster River, and Dover.
