= Northeast Coast campaign (1724) =

- Part of Dummer's War
Date	19 April 1723 – 28 January 1724
Location	Berwick, Maine to Mount Desert Island
Result	Inconclusive

Belligerents
New England Colonies; Mohawk	Wabanaki Confederacy

Commanders and leaders
John Winslow; William Dummer; Samuel Penhallow (WIA); Josiah Winslow †	(Kingdom of France) Sébastien Rale †; Chief Mog †; Chief Bomoseen †; Chief Wissememet †; Chief Job †; Chief Carabesett †

Strength
~265 militiamen	Unknown

Casualties and losses
94 killed or captured	at least 25 killed or captured

The Northeast Coast campaign (1724) occurred during Dummer's War from March 1724 – September 1724. The Wabanaki Confederacy attacked English settlements along the coast of present-day Maine below the Kennebec River, between Berwick and Mount Desert Island. Casco (also known as Falmouth and Portland) was the principal settlement. The 1723 campaign was so successful along the Maine frontier that William Dummer ordered its evacuation to the blockhouses in the spring of 1724.

In March and April the Wabanaki killed 30 British settlers. The most significant battle was between Captain Josiah Winslow (older brother of John Winslow) who was stationed at Fort St. George. He with 16 troops were going down river in two whale boats when they were ambushed by the Tarrantines (Mi'kmaq). All but three were killed, including Josiah Winslow.

The natives then attacked Captain Samuel Penhallow at Fort Menaskoux, Arrowsic, killing numerous cattle and taking three prisoners.

The campaign began at sea against the British fishing vessels. The Mi'kmaq from Cape Sable Island, Nova Scotia participated in the naval warfare. They killed 22 and took 23 prisoners

In response, the British targeted Father Rale.
