= We Were Not the Savages =

1993 book by Daniel N. Paul

We Were Not the Savages (1993 and later editions) is a history of the Mi'kmaq people during the period of European colonization written by Daniel N. Paul. It has been published in four editions. The first, subtitled A Micmac Perspective on the Collision of Aboriginal and European Civilizations, was published by Nimbus, based in Halifax, Nova Scotia. Fernwood Publishing, also of Halifax, published an updated edition in 2000; and in 2006 Paul expanded and revised the book, publishing it through Fernwood, with the simple subtitle, Collision Between European and Native American Civilizations. In 2022, Paul released a fourth edition of the book.

The 2006 edition has fourteen chapters, ranging from "Mi'kmaq Social Values and Economy" to "Twentieth-Century Racism and Centralization" and "The Struggle for Freedom." It delineates seven independent Mi'kmaq Districts, which cover all of the Canadian Provinces of Nova Scotia and Prince Edward Island, New Brunswick, north of the Saint John River, Quebec, the Gaspe region, and the Northern part of the State of Maine, USA. It argues that pre-contact Mi'kmaq people enjoyed what was probably the highest standard of living in the world, without poverty or hunger, and with a social environment that valued community well-being. The book's middle chapters trace the wars with European nations during the period of colonization, and the major Indian treaties of the eighteenth century. In the final chapters, Paul describes Mi'kmaq communities and land bases as dramatically reduced and impoverished by less than two centuries of European colonization.

== Reception ==
One reviewer has described the book as "a Canadian version of Dee Brown's best seller Bury My Heart at Wounded Knee", a seminal work published in 1971.

Review by Professor Geoffrey Plank:

"We Were Not the Savages is something rare and wonderful, a comprehensive history of an indigenous American people, written by a member of the nation, covering in detail the times before European colonisation, the brutal period of conquest, and the struggle for justice that continues to the present day. The book is disarmingly and engagingly written. Every story within it is either carefully documented with citations to archival material or scholarly sources, or else deeply informed by Paul’s personal experience and what he has learned from his neighbours. Those of you who have read earlier editions of this book should pick up this one. Paul has thoroughly rewritten the book, updating the scholarship, adding personal material, and carrying the story forward to the present day. Our understanding of the history of north-eastern North America has been transformed since the publication of the first edition of We Were Not the Savages. Especially in Nova Scotia, the impact of that transformation is visible on the landscape. If you want to understand what’s happened, you need to read the fourth edition."

Critic Tasha Hubbard says that "Paul is not afraid to stray from the typical 'objective' tone found in most historical texts." American scholar Michael Mullin has written that the book is "a call for help. . .[written] for other Micmacs and their allies in the larger Canadian community."

== Edition history ==
Each new edition is revised with new information added.

- We Were Not the Savages: A Micmac Perspective on the Collision of European and Aboriginal Civilizations (1st ed.). Nimbus. 1993. ISBN 978-1-55109-056-6.
- We Were Not the Savages: A Mi'kmaq Perspective on the Collision Between European and Native American Civilizations (2nd ed.). Fernwood. 2000. ISBN 978-1-55266-039-3.
- We Were Not the Savages: Collision Between European and Native American Civilizations (3rd ed.). Fernwood. 2006. ISBN 978-1-55266-209-0.
- We Were Not the Savages: Collision Between European and Native American Civilizations (4th ed.). Fernwood. 2022. ISBN 978-1-77363-563-7.
