= History of Dartmouth, Nova Scotia =

History of Canadian city

Dartmouth founded in 1750, is a Metropolitan Area and former city in the Canadian province of Nova Scotia.

Dartmouth and the neighbouring metropolitan area of Halifax form the urban core of the Halifax Regional Municipality (HRM). Both cities, along with the town of Bedford and the Municipality of the County of Halifax were dissolved on April 1, 1996 when they were amalgamated into HRM.

A 560 page history of Dartmouth, The Story of Dartmouth, was privately published by John Patrick Martin in 1957, with a revised edition in 1965. The John Martin Junior High School was named in his honour.

== Mi'kmaq ==
Prior to European colonization, the region around Dartmouth was inhabited the indigenous Mi'kmaq people, who had occupied the area for roughly a millennium. The Mi'kmaq called the area Ponamogoatitjg (Boonamoogwaddy), which has been varyingly translated as "Tomcod Ground" or "Salmon Place" in reference to the fish which were presumably caught in this part of Halifax Harbour. There is evidence that bands would spend the summer on the shores of the Bedford Basin, moving to points inland before the harsh Atlantic winter set in. From Dartmouth Cove, the Mi'kmaq would have followed an important canoe route inland via the Dartmouth lakes to the Sipekne'katik (Shubenacadie) waterway.

Establishing a Protestant settlement on shores of Chebucto (Dartmouth/ Halifax) was a strategic British manoeuver to control Acadia and defeat France in North America. The Mi'kmaq, Canadien Indigenous fighters and some Acadians launched several raids on the fledgling colonial settlement.

One of Halifax's last surviving Mi'kmaq communities was located at Turtle Grove near present-day Tuft's Cove but was devastated in the December 6, 1917 Halifax Explosion. Today the Millbrook First Nation has a small satellite reserve in Cole Harbour on the eastern edge of Dartmouth.

== Eighteenth Century ==
=== Father Le Loutre’s War ===
Despite the British Conquest of Acadia in 1710, Nova Scotia remained primarily occupied by Catholic Acadians and Mi'kmaq. Father Le Loutre's War began when Edward Cornwallis arrived to establish Halifax with 13 transports on June 21, 1749. The British quickly began to build other settlements. To guard against Mi'kmaq, Acadian and French attacks on the new Protestant settlements, British fortifications were erected in Halifax (1749), Bedford (Fort Sackville) (1749), Dartmouth (1750), Lunenburg (1753) and Lawrencetown (1754). During Father Le Loutre’s War, there were 4 raids on Dartmouth.

In August 1750, the sailing ship Alderney arrived with 353 immigrants. Municipal officials at Halifax decided that these new arrivals should be settled on the eastern side of Halifax Harbour. The community was later given the English name of Dartmouth in honour of William Legge, 1st Earl of Dartmouth who was a former Secretary of State.

==== Raid on Dartmouth (1749) ====
The Mi'kmaq saw the founding of Halifax without negotiation as a violation of earlier agreements with the British. On 24 September 1749 the Mi'kmaq formally declared their hostility to the British plans for settlement without more formal negotiations. On September 30, 1749, about forty Mi'kmaq attacked six men who were in Dartmouth cutting trees at the saw mill which was under the command of Major Gilman. Four of them were killed, two of whom were scalped, the heads of two were cut off, one was taken prisoner and one escaped giving the alarm. A detachment of rangers was sent after the raiding party and cut off the heads of two Mi'kmaq and scalped one. This raid was the first of eight against Dartmouth.

The result of the raid, on October 2, 1749, Cornwallis offered a bounty on the head of every Mi'kmaq. He set the amount at the same rate that the Mi'kmaq received from the French for British scalps. As well, to carry out this task, two companies of New England Rangers were raised, one led by Captain Francis Bartelo and the other by Captain William Clapham. These two companies served alongside that of John Gorham's company. The three companies scoured the land around Halifax looking for Mi'kmaq.

==== Raid on Dartmouth (1750) ====
In July 1750, the Mi'kmaq killed and scalped 7 men who were at work in Dartmouth. In August 1750, 353 people arrived on the Alderney and began the town of Dartmouth. The town was laid out in the autumn of that year. The following month, on September 30, 1750, Dartmouth was attacked again by the Mi'kmaq and five more residents were killed.

In October 1750 a group of about eight men went out "to take their diversion; and as they were fowling, they were attacked by the Indians, who took the whole prisoners; scalped ... [one] with a large knife, which they wear for that purpose, and threw him into the sea ..."

==== Raid on Dartmouth (1751 March) ====
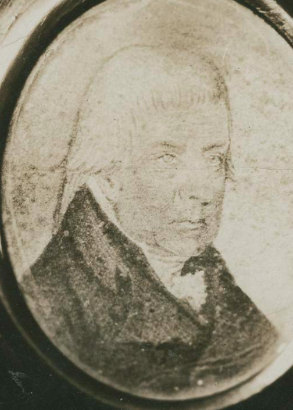
John George Pyke, Only image of survivor of the Raid on Dartmouth (1751); only known image of passenger on the Alderney

The next year, on March 26, 1751, the Mi'kmaq attacked again, killing fifteen settlers and wounding seven, three of which would later die of their wounds. They took six captives, and the regulars who pursued the Mi'kmaq fell into an ambush in which they lost a sergeant killed.

Two days later, on March 28, 1751, Mi'kmaq abducted another three settlers.

==== Dartmouth Massacre (1751 May) ====
Three months later, on May 13, 1751, Broussard led sixty Mi'kmaq and Acadians to attack Dartmouth again, in what would be known as the "Dartmouth Massacre". Broussard and the others killed twenty settlers - mutilating men, women, children and babies - and took more prisoner. A sergeant was also killed and his body mutilated. They destroyed the buildings. The British returned to Halifax with the scalp of one Mi'kmaq warrior, however, they reported that they killed six Mi'kmaq warriors.

=== French and Indian War ===
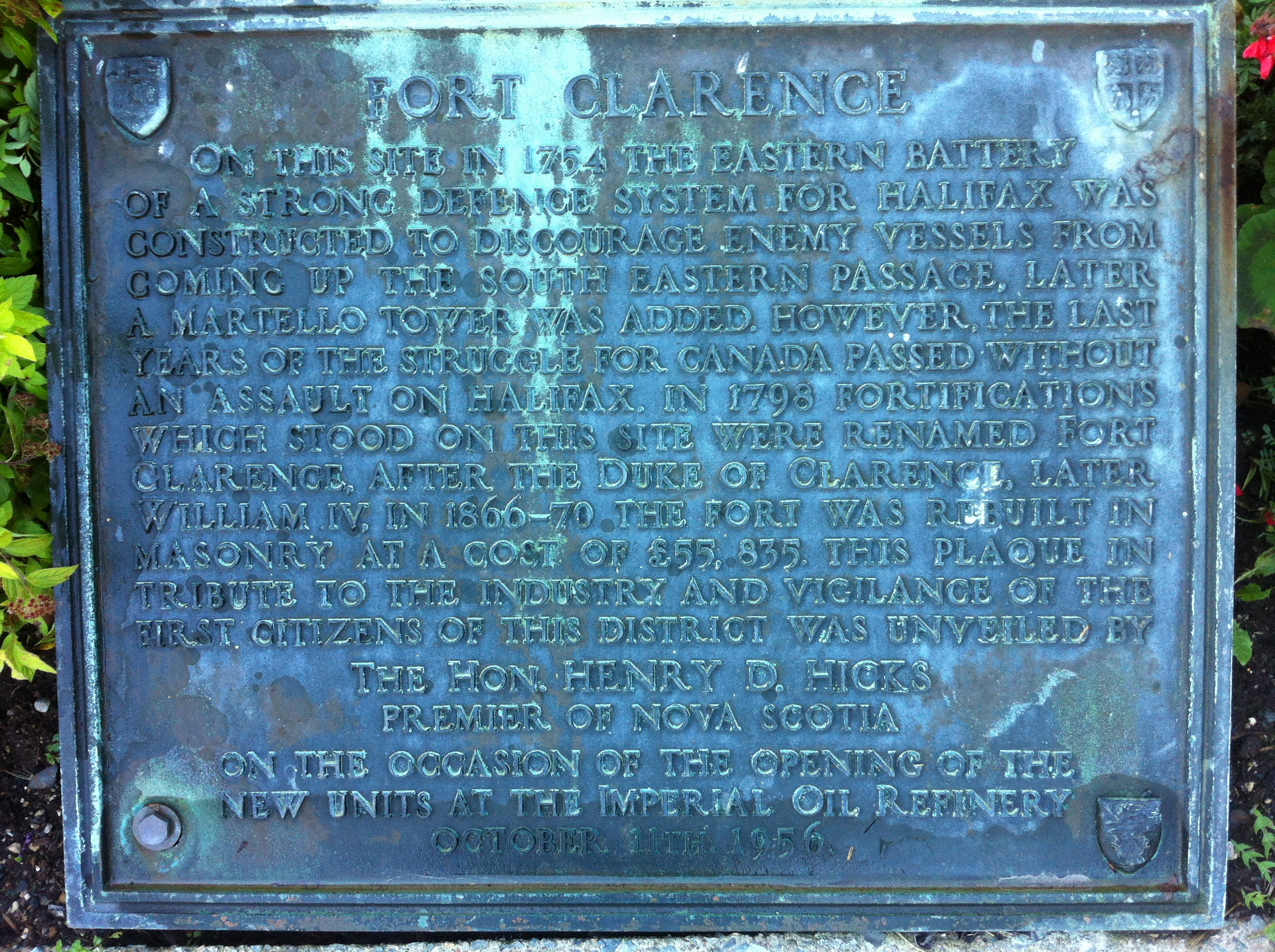
Eastern Battery Plaque, Dartmouth, Nova Scotia

By June 1757, the settlers had to be withdrawn completely from the settlement of Lawrencetown (established 1754) because the number of Indian raids eventually prevented settlers from leaving their houses.

In nearby Dartmouth, Nova Scotia, in the spring of 1759, there was another Mi'kmaq attack on Eastern Battery, in which five soldiers were killed.

=== The Quakers ===
Dartmouth continued to develop slowly. In 1785, at the end of the American Revolution, a group of Quakers from Nantucket arrived in Dartmouth to set up a whaling trade. They built homes, a Quaker meeting house, a wharf for their vessels and a factory to produce spermaceti candles and other products made from whale oil and carcasses. It was a profitable venture and the Quakers employed many local residents, but within ten years, around 1795, the whalers moved their operation to Wales. Only one Quaker residence remains preserved in Dartmouth (others have been modernized) and is believed to be the oldest structure in Dartmouth.

=== Loyalists ===
Other families soon arrived in Dartmouth, among them was the Hartshorne family. They were Loyalists who arrived in 1785, and received a grant that included land bordering present-day Portland, King and Wentworth Streets. Woodlawn was once part of the land purchased by a Loyalist, named Ebenezer Allen who became a prominent Dartmouth businessman. In 1786, he donated land near his estate to be used as a cemetery. Many early settlers are interred in the Woodlawn cemetery including the remains of the "Babes in the Woods," two sisters who wandered into the forest and perished.{25}

== Nineteenth Century ==
By the early 19th century, Dartmouth consisted of about twenty-five families working as a sawmill and agricultural outpost of Halifax. However, in the mid 19th century, Dartmouth grew quickly, first with the construction of the Shubenacadie Canal in the 1820s and more importantly with the rise of successful industrial firms such as the Dartmouth Marine Slips founded in 1850. Within twenty years, there were sixty houses, a church, gristmill, shipyards, saw mill, two inns and a bakery located near the harbour. In 1860, Starr Manufacturing Company began operations near the Shubenacadie Canal. The factory employed over 150 workers and manufactured one of the world's first mass-produced ice skates, as well as cut nails, vault doors, iron bridge work and other heavy iron products. The Mott's candy and soap factory, employing 100, opened at Hazelhurst (near present-day Hazelhurst and Newcastle Streets). The Stairs Ropeworks, later Consumer Cordage, was a rope factory on Wyse Road offered work to over 300 and created its own residential neighborhood. The Symonds Foundry employed a further 50 to 100 people.

As the population grew, more houses were erected and new businesses established. Subdivisions such as Woodlawn, Woodside and Westphal developed on the outskirts of the town.

=== The Tallahassee Escape ===
During the American Civil War, on August 18, 1864, the Confederate ship CSS Tallahassee under the command of John Taylor Wood sailed into Halifax harbour for supplies, coal and to make repairs to her mainmast. Wood began loading coal at Woodside, on the Dartmouth shore. Two union ships were closing in on the Tallahassee, the Nansemont and the Huron. While Wood was offered an escort out of the harbour he instead slipped out of the harbour under the cover of night by going through the seldom used Eastern Passage between McNab’s Island and the Dartmouth Shore. The channel was narrow and crooked with a shallow tide so Wood hired the local pilot Jock Flemming. The Tallahassee left the Woodside wharf at 9:00 p.m. on the 19th. All the lights were out, but the residents on the Eastern Passage mainland could see the dark hull moving through the water, successfully evading capture.

=== Incorporation as a Town ===
In 1873 Dartmouth was incorporated as a town and a Town Hall was established in 1877. In 1883 "The Dartmouth Times" began publishing. In 1885 a railway station was built, and the first passenger service starts in 1886 with branch lines running to Windsor Junction by 1896 and the Eastern Shore by 1904. Two attempts were made to bridge The Narrows of Halifax Harbour with a railway line during the 1880s but were washed away by powerful storms. These attempts were abandoned after the line to Windsor Junction was completed. The line running through Dartmouth was envisioned to continue along the Eastern Shore to Canso or Guysborough, however developers built it inland along the Musquodoboit River at Musquodoboit Harbour and it ended in the Musquodoboit Valley farming settlement of Upper Musquodoboit, ending Dartmouth's vision of becoming a railway hub.

== Twentieth century ==
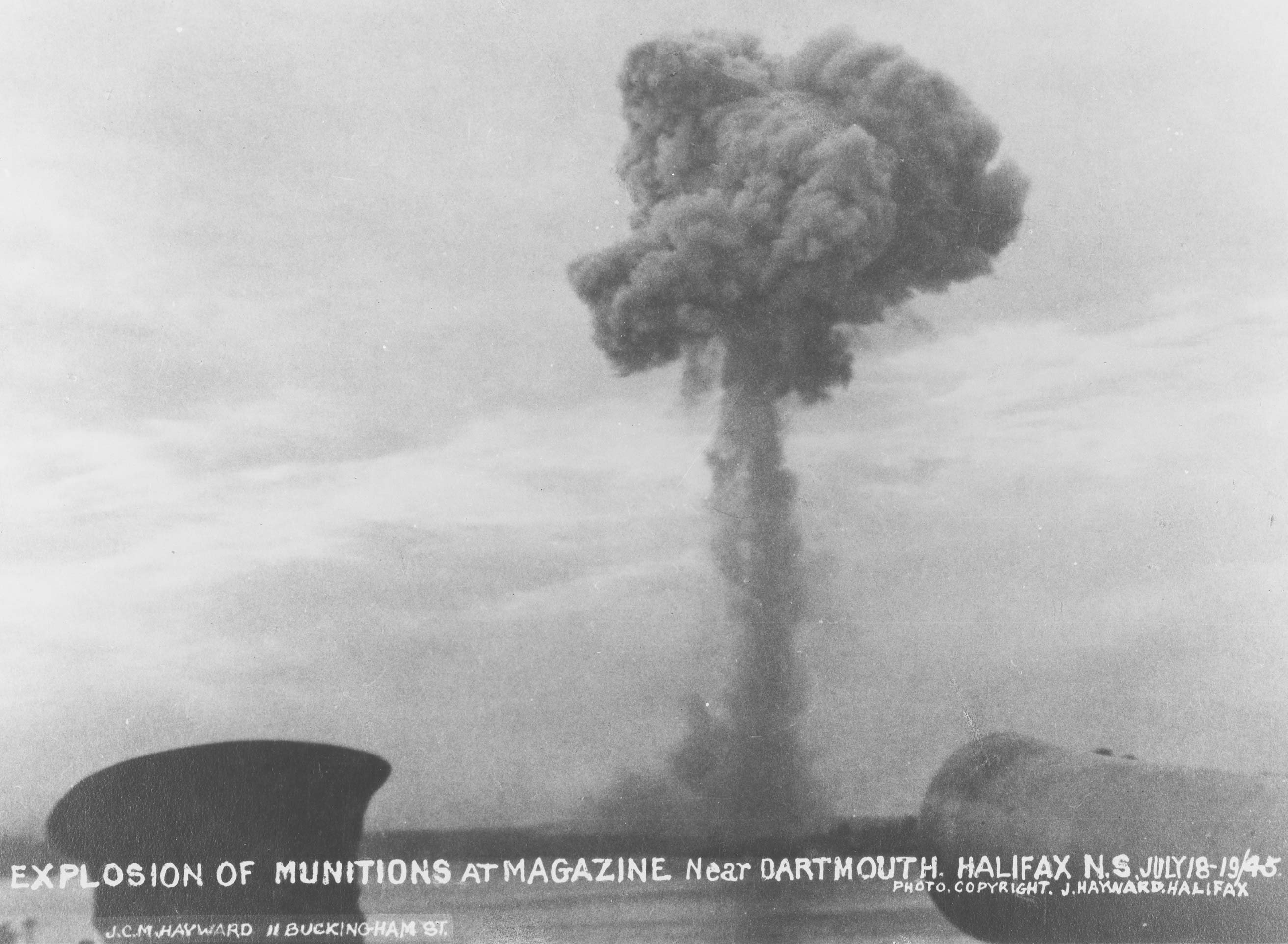
Blast cloud from the Bedford Magazine Explosion

=== Halifax Explosion ===
The Dartmouth side of the harbour was not as densely populated as Halifax and was separated from the blast by the width of the harbour, but still suffered heavy damage. Estimates are that almost 100 people died on the Dartmouth side. Windows were shattered and many buildings were damaged or destroyed, including the Oland Brewery and parts of the Starr Manufacturing Company. Nova Scotia Hospital was the only hospital on the Dartmouth side of the harbour and many of the victims were treated there.

=== Bedford Magazine Explosion ===
During World War II Dartmouth as with Halifax was busy supporting Canada's war effort in Europe. On July 18, 1945, at the end of the Second World War, a fire broke out at the magazine jetty on the Bedford Basin, north of Dartmouth. The fire began on a sunken barge and quickly spread to the dock. A violent series of large explosions ensued as stored ammunition exploded. The barge responsible for starting the explosion presently lies on the seabed near the eastern shoreline adjacent to the Magazine Dock.

=== Postwar Boom ===
Dartmouth saw rapid growth after 1954 when the Angus L. Macdonald Bridge opened, finally providing a direct roadlink to Halifax. The completion of the Macdonald Bridge allowed rapid suburban residential development and prompted the construction of shopping centres such as the original Dartmouth Shopping Centre at the foot of the bridge and Mic Mac Mall. Most of the Dartmouth Shopping Centre was demolished in 2024 to make way for residential redevelopment, while three detached stores remained open temporarily."Most of Dartmouth Shopping Centre to make way for residential development". Retail and Housing Property News Service. 11 November 2024.

=== Amalgamation to City Of Dartmouth ===
In 1961 the communities of Woodlawn, Woodside and Westphal along with the area of the town of Dartmouth joined together to become the "City Of Dartmouth" the city was the third largest city in Nova Scotia, after Halifax and Sydney.

=== Amalgamation to Halifax Regional Municipality ===
During the 1990s, Dartmouth like many other Canadian cities, amalgamated with its suburbs under a single municipal government. The provincial government had sought to reduce the number of municipal governments throughout the province as a cost-saving measure and created a task force in 1992 to pursue this rationalization.

In 1995, an Act to Incorporate the Halifax Regional Municipality received Royal Assent in the provincial legislature and the Halifax Regional Municipality (HRM) was created on April 1, 1996. HRM is an amalgamation of all municipal governments in Halifax County, these being the cities of Halifax and Dartmouth, town of Bedford, and Municipality of the County of Halifax). Dartmouth still retained its place name and identity The term "Dartmouthians", still refers to the residents living in the area of Dartmouth, the regional municipality is often referred by its full name or the initials "HRM" especially in the media refers to the municipal government or the whole area of the Halifax Regional Municipality .
