= Northeast Coast campaign (1747) =

- Part of King George's War
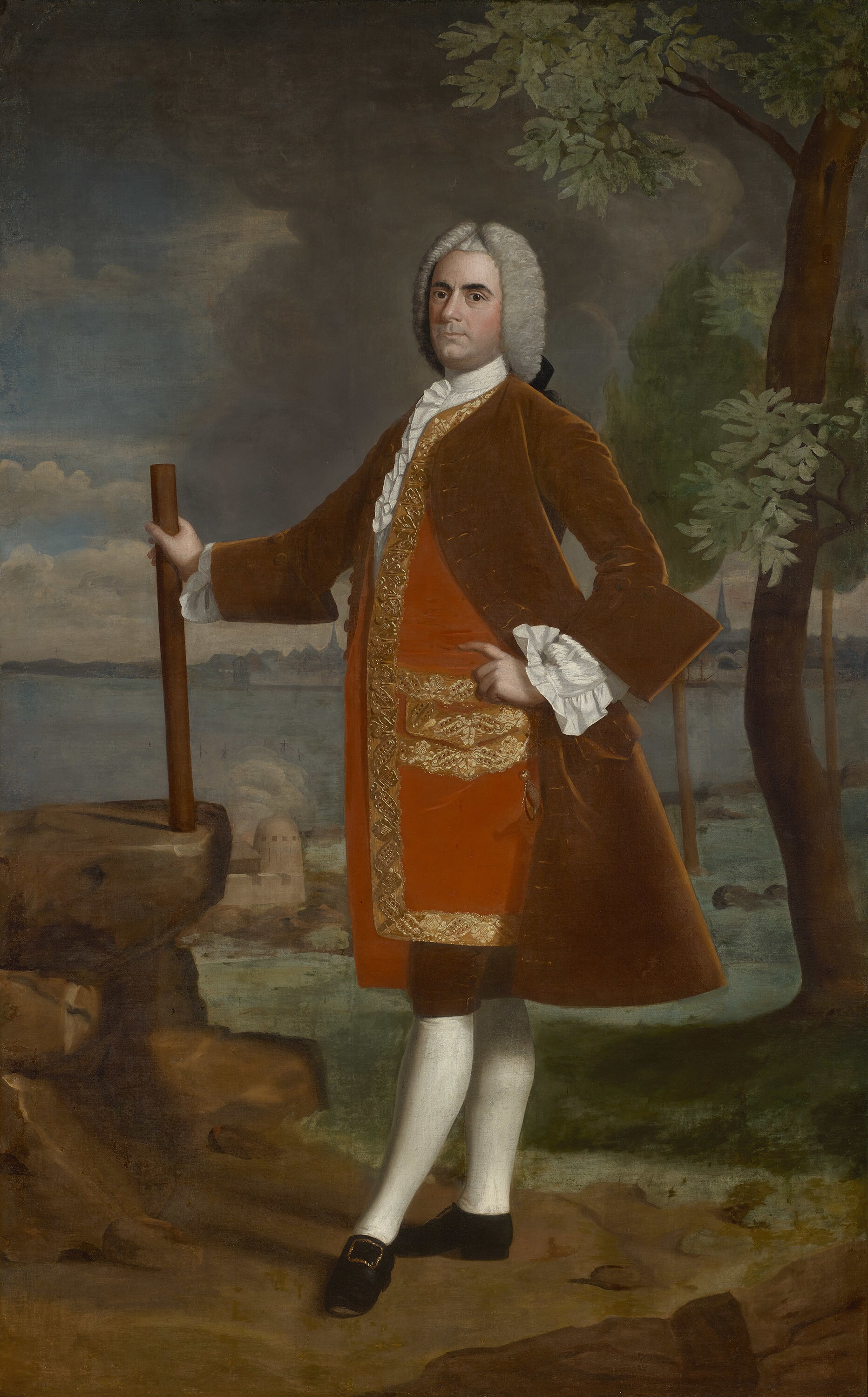
- Commander Samuel Waldo
Date	April – September 1747
Location	Berwick, Maine to St. Georges (Thomaston, Maine)
Result	French and Wabanaki Confederacy victory

Belligerents
New England	French colonists Wabanaki Confederacy

Commanders and leaders
Commander Samuel Waldo (Falmouth); Captain Jonathan Williamson	Unknown

Strength
625	Unknown

Casualties and losses
Approximately 30 persons killed or captured	Unknown

The Northeast Coast campaign of 1747 was conducted by the Wabanaki Confederacy of Acadia against the New England settlements along the coast of present-day Maine below the Kennebec River, the former border of Acadia. It took place from July until September 1747, and formed part of King George's War. The Wabanaki carried out 11 raids on English settlements on the coast between Berwick and St. Georges, with every town on the frontier being attacked. Casco (also known as Falmouth and Portland) was the principal settlement.

== Background ==
The Northeast Coast campaign of 1747 followed those of 1745 and 1746.

Following two attacks on Annapolis Royal in 1744, Governor William Shirley put a bounty on the Passamaquoddy, Mi’kmaq and Maliseet on October 20. During the campaign the following year, on August 23, 1745, Shirley declared war against the rest of the Wabanaki Confederacy – the Penobscot and Kennebec tribes.

In response to the New England expedition against Louisbourg which finished in June 1745, the Wabanaki retaliated by attacking the New England border. New England braced itself for such an attack by appointing a provisional force of 450 to defend the frontier. After the attacks began, they increased the number of soldiers by 175 men. Massachusetts established forts along the border with Acadia: Fort George at Brunswick (1715), St. George's Fort at Thomaston (1720), and Fort Richmond (1721). Fort Frederick was established at Pemaquid (Bristol, Maine).

== The campaign ==
The Wabanaki Confederacy began their first raid on April 13 at Scarborough, killing two people and taking four prisoners.

A militia of 50 Wabanaki raided Falmouth on April 21; they killed cattle and attacked Charles Frost’s family, taking captive his wife and six children. Despite sending 26 men after them under Captain IIsley, they were unable to catch the Wabanaki and their prisoners.

Captain Jordan’s company of 30 was posted from Falmouth to Topsham, leaving the town defenseless. The Wabanaki killed two women and a man. Crossing the Androscoggin River in canoes, they then killed two men and wounded a third; one woman escaped.

On 26 May, 100 Wabanaki attacked Fort Frederick at Pemaquid. The killed five soldiers and five recruits, and the other inhabitants were taken prisoner.

At Damariscotta, they took one prisoner, killing his wife and child.

At Wiscasset, the Wabanaki again seized Capt. Jonathan Williamson.

A company of 60 Wabanaki attacked Fort Frederick in early September, killing five guards before withdrawing. At Fort Georges, they tried, unsuccessfully, to dig a tunnel into the fort.

== Aftermath ==
The Wabanaki took Frances Noble captive close to Fort Richmond in 1748. She wrote an account of her captivity.

Wabanaki also killed a number of British at Fort St. Georges in the fall of 1748.

== See also ==
- Military history of Nova Scotia
- Northeast Coast campaign (1703)
- Northeast Coast campaign (1723)
