= Flying Point =

- Promontory
- Interactive map of Flying Point
- Coordinates: 43.80900°N 70.07059°W
- Country: United States
- State: Maine
- County: Cumberland
- Town: Freeport
- Time zone: UTC-5 (Eastern (EST))
  - Summer (DST): UTC-4 (EDT)

Flying Point is a promontory in Freeport, Maine, United States. It is located around 3.6 miles (5.8 km) southeast of downtown Freeport, overlooking Casco Bay, around 2,000 feet (610 m) north of Bustins Island. It sits across a cove from Wolfe's Neck Woods State Park, to the northwest.

The point has given its name to nearby Flying Point Road and Lower Flying Point Road. Little Flying Point, meanwhile, is located around 2 miles (3.2 km) to the northeast, across Brickyard Cove, near the L.L. Bean Flying Point Paddling Center and Mann Cemetery.

A fault line exists at Flying Point, according to the Department of Conservation.

== See also ==
- Means massacre, which occurred nearby in 1756
