= Fort St. George (Thomaston, Maine) =

British colonial fort (from 1720)

Coordinates: 44°04′20″N 69°10′55″W

Fort St. George was a British colonial fort built at present-day Thomaston, Maine during the lead up to Dummer's War.

== Dummer's War ==
In 1719–1720, the old trading post was remodeled into a stockaded fort protected by two blockhouses. But the Abenaki Indian tribes protested the encroachment of an English fort on their territory. Instigated by the French, they attacked the garrison twice during Dummer's War in 1722, which was relieved by Col. Thomas Westbrook, then raided again in 1723, besieging the fort for 30 days.

The Commanders were Thomas Smith, John Gyles (who also served at Fort George (Brunswick, Maine)) Jabez Bradbury (who also served at Fort Richmond (Maine) and Captain John North.

In the spring of 1724, the command of St. George's Fort at Thomaston was given to Capt. Josiah Winslow (older brother of John Winslow). On 30 April 1724, during the Northeast Coast Campaign (1724), Winslow and Sergeant Harvey and 17 men in two whale boats left George's Fort and went downriver several miles to Green Island. The following day, the two whale boats became separated and approximately 200–300 Abenaki descended on Harvey's boat, killing Harvey and all of his men except three native guides who escaped to the George's fort. Captain Winslow was then surrounded by 30 to 40 canoes, several with four or six men apiece aboard, which came off from both sides of the river and attacked him with great fury. With the Indians closing on him with their canoes, Winslow fired upon them when they were almost aboard him. After hours of fighting, Winslow and his men were killed, except for three friendly Indians who escaped back to the fort (one was named Wm. Jeffries of Harwich). The native Tarrantines were reported to have lost over 25 warriors.

In response, in August, soldiers from Fort Richmond destroyed the Abenaki stronghold of Norridgewock in 1724.

== King George's War ==
During the Northeast Coast Campaign (1745), St. George's garrison at Thomaston was attacked again and one company of men was killed, while three other men were taken captive. The Campaign began when, on July 19, Mi’kmaq from Nova Scotia, Maliseet, and some from St. Francois attacked Fort St. George (Thomaston) and New Castle. They set fire to numerous buildings; killed cattle and took one villager captive. Near the garrison, two women were captured: one was taken to Canada, while the other escaped. On September 5, tribes of the Confederacy attacked Thomston (St. Georges) for the third time, killing and scalping two people.

== French and Indian War ==
During the French and Indian War, 24 March 1756, 10 natives attacked three men at the fort, killing two.

In retaliation for the fall of Louisbourg, on 13 August 1758 French officer Boishebert left Miramichi, New Brunswick with 400 soldiers for Fort St George (Thomaston, Maine). His detachment reached there on 9 September but was caught in an ambush and had to withdraw. This was Boishébert's last Acadian expedition. They then went on to raid Friendship, Maine, where people were killed and others taken prisoner. Hostilities of the French and Indian Wars ceased with the 1759 Fall of Quebec.

== Commanding officers ==
- Thomas Smith
- John Gyles (who also served at Fort George (Brunswick, Maine))
- Jabez Bradbury (who also served at Fort Richmond (Maine) - Indians: "We have had a great and long Experience of Captaincies. Bradbury's fidelity. The Lieutenant is a good Truck-Master; it would do your Hearts good to see how kind he is to us, and how just he treats us."
- Captain John North.
- Capt. Josiah Winslow (1724, older brother of John Winslow).
- Captain Bradbury (1745–1757) - on 21 Sept 1753 Indians reported: "Capt. Bradbury and Lieut. Fletcher, are very good Men, We like them well."
- Captain John North (1757–)
- T. Fletcher (1756)
