= Northeast Coast campaign (1746) =

- Part of King George's War
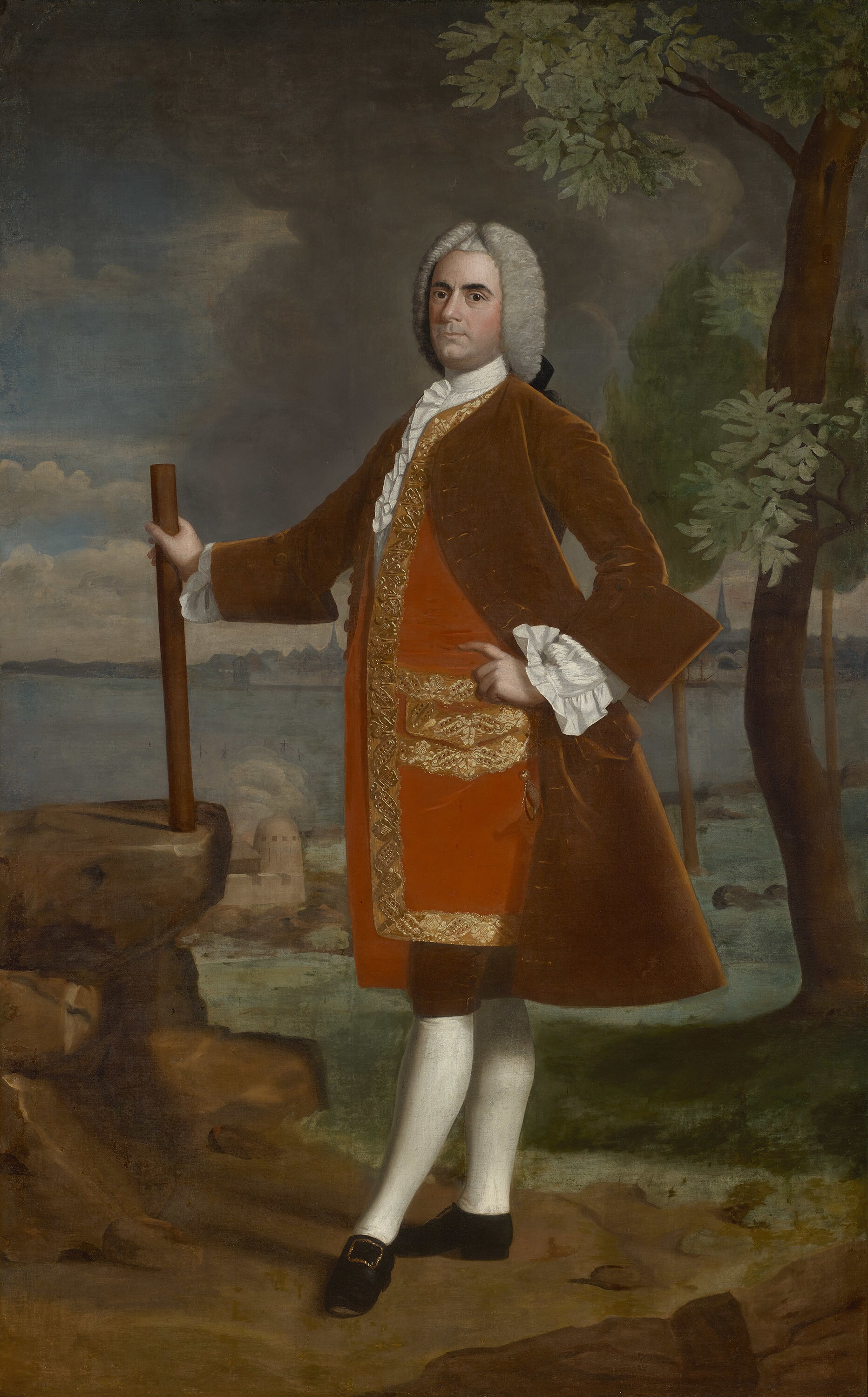
- Commander Samuel Waldo
| Date | April – September 1746 |
| Location | Berwick, Maine to St. Georges (Thomaston, Maine) |
| Result | French and Wabanaki Confederacy victory |

Belligerents
| New England | French colonists Wabanaki Confederacy |

Commanders and leaders
| Commander Samuel Waldo (Falmouth); Captain Jonathan Williamson | Unknown |

Strength
| 625 | Unknown |

Casualties and losses
| Approximately 30 persons killed or captured | Unknown |

The Northeast Coast campaign of 1746 was conducted by the Wabanaki Confederacy of Acadia against the New England settlements along the coast of present-day Maine below the Kennebec River, the former border of Acadia. During King George's War from July until September 1746, they attacked English settlements on the coast of present-day Maine between Berwick and St. Georges (Thomaston, Maine). Within two months there were 9 raids - every town on the frontier had been attacked. Casco (also known as Falmouth and Portland) was the principal settlement.

== Background ==
After the two attacks on Annapolis Royal in 1744, Governor William Shirley put a bounty on the Passamaquoddy, Mi’kmaq and Maliseet on Oct 20. The following year, during the campaign, on August 23, 1745, Shirley declared war against the rest of the Wabanaki Confederacy – the Penobscot and Kennebec tribes.

In response to the New England expedition against Louisbourg which finished in June 1745, the Wabanaki retaliated by attacking the New England border. New England braced itself for such an attack by appointing a provisional force of 450 to defend the frontier. After the attacks began they increased the number of soldiers by 175 men. Massachusetts established forts along the border with Acadia: Fort George at Brunswick (1715), St. George's Fort at Thomaston (1720), and Fort Richmond (1721) at Richmond. Fort Frederick was established at Pemaquid (Bristol, Maine).

After the Northeast Coast campaign (1745), another 200 British troops were sent to the New England/ Acadia border in January and 460 more in the spring.

== The campaign ==
The 1746 campaign started on April 19 when a militia of 10 natives raided Gorhamtown. Gorham had a blockhouse and four families. The natives divided into five parties of two. They then attacked the four families at the same time. Killing a father and four children killed, while taking the mother captive. They took two other fathers prisoner. The men in the blockhouse charged after the natives and one of the militia men was taken captive.

The Confederacy next raided present-day Waldoboro, Maine, burning the village and killing some while taking others into captivity. Some of the villagers fled to Pemaquid and others to St. Georges. People did not return until after the war.

The Confederacy raided Pemaquid, killing cattle.

A militia of 15 native men ambushed 5 people at Sheepscot (present-day Newcastle, Maine), killing one of them. A villager killed one of the natives.

At Wiscasset, Maine, natives killed 19 cattle and took Captain Jonathan Williamson captive for 6 months.

There was a battle near Fort St. Georges at Thomaston where one native was killed and one wounded.

A militia of 30 natives were at Falmouth and North Yarmouth, Maine. They killed two near Long-creek (Stroudwater). The soldiers from New Casco Fort approached, the natives retreated to attack Frost’s garrisoned house at Stroudwater but it was heavily defended. Another blockhouse was built.

At Scarborough, Maine the natives killed a soldier and several others.

Last attack happened on 26 August in the vicinity of Pemaquid, Fort Frederick. Settlers destroyed his cattle and entire habitation, wounding the owner and his son.

== Aftermath ==
In response to these events, Shirley sent more troops and munitions to the Maine frontier over the winter, anticipating the Wabanaki campaign in the spring of 1747. In response St. Georges was garrisoned with 30 men; 370 put between Berwick and Damariscotta. 150 were detailed as minutemen. Scalp bounties were increased to 250 pounds for scalps taken west of Passamquoddy, 100 for anywhere else.

== See also ==
- Military history of Nova Scotia
- Northeast Coast campaign (1703)
- Northeast Coast campaign (1723)
