= Northeast Coast campaign (1745) =

- Part of King George's War
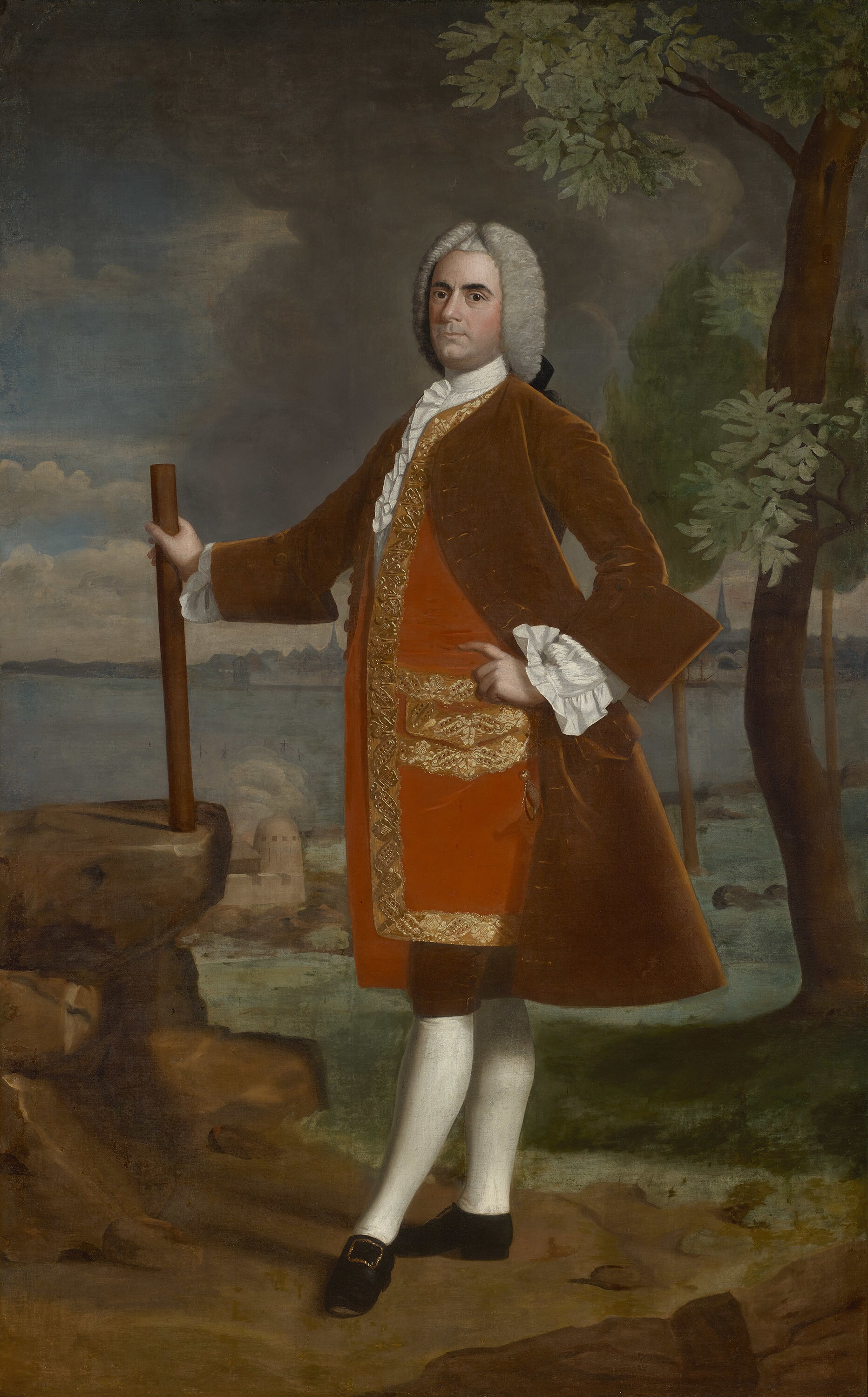
- Commander Samuel Waldo
| Date | 19 July – 5 September 1745 |
| Location | Berwick, Maine to St. Georges (Thomaston, Maine) |
| Result | French and Wabanaki Confederacy victory |

Belligerents
| New England | French colonists Wabanaki Confederacy |

Commanders and leaders
| Commander Samuel Waldo (Falmouth); Captain Jonathan Bean; Captain Mochus; Captain Thomas Bradbury (Saco); Jabez Bradbury (Fort St. George, Thomaston) | Colonel Morris †; Captain Sam †; Colonel Job |

Strength
| 625 | Unknown |

Casualties and losses
| Approximately 30 persons killed or captured | Unknown |

The Northeast Coast campaign (1745) occurred during King George's War from 19 July until 5 September 1745. Three weeks after the British Siege of Louisbourg (1745), the Wabanaki Confederacy of Acadia retaliated by attacking New England settlements along the coast of present-day Maine below the Kennebec River, the former border of Acadia. They attacked English settlements on the coast of present-day Maine between Berwick and St. Georges (Thomaston, Maine), within two months there were 11 raids - every town on the frontier had been attacked. Casco (also known as Falmouth and Portland) was the principal settlement.

== Background ==
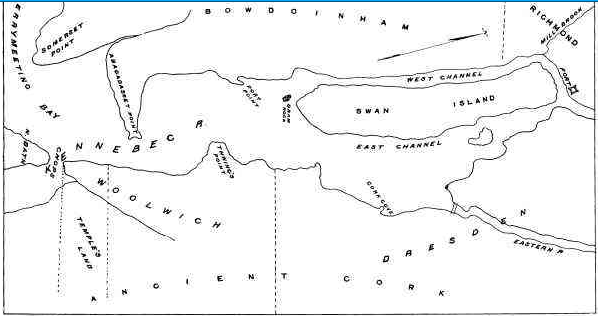
Fort Richmond (Maine)

After the two attacks on Annapolis Royal in 1744, Governor William Shirley put a bounty on the Passamaquoddy, Mi’kmaq and Maliseet on Oct 20. The following year, during the campaign, on August 23, 1745, Shirley declared war against the rest of the Wabanaki Confederacy – the Penobscot and Kennebec tribes. In response to the New England expedition against Louisbourg which finished in June 1745, the Wabanaki retaliated by attacking the New England border. New England braced itself for such an attack by appointing a provisional force of 450 to defend the frontier. After the attacks began they increased the number of soldiers by 175 men. Massachusetts established forts along the border with Acadia: Fort George at Brunswick (1715), St. George's Fort at Thomaston (1720), and Fort Richmond (1721) at Richmond. Fort Frederick was established at Pemaquid (Bristol, Maine).

== The campaign ==
The campaign began when, on July 19, Mi’kmaq from Nova Scotia, Maliseet and some from St. Francois attacked Fort St.George (Thomaston) and New Castle. They set fire to numerous buildings; killed cattle and took one villager captive. They also killed a person at Saco. At the same time, Penobscot and Norridgewock attacked Fort Frederick at Pemaquid. They took captive a woman, which alarmed the garrison but she escaped. The same month they killed a boy at Topsham and a man at New Meadows. In the same month, 30 Wabanaki attacked North Yarmouth and killed a man. At Flying-point they killed three members of a family and taking a daughter prisoner to Canada. During this raid on Flying-point, they also killed one man, made another prisoner, while another escaped. St. Georges garrison at Thomaston was attacked again and one company of men was killed, while three other men were taken captive. Near the garrison, two women were captured: one was taken to Canada, while the other escaped. They attacked Scarborough and one man killed. Then at Sheepscot they attacked and killed two and wounded one. On Sept 5 tribes of the Confederacy attacked Thomston (St. Georges) for the third time, killing and scalping two people.

== Aftermath ==
In response to these events, Shirley sent more troops and munitions to the Maine frontier over the winter, anticipating the Wabanaki campaign in the spring of 1746. There were nine raids in the campaign of 1746 and 12 raids in the Northeast Coast campaign of 1747.

== See also ==
- Military history of Nova Scotia
- Northeast Coast campaign (1703)
- Northeast Coast campaign (1723)
