= Northeast Coast campaign (1723) =

1723 conflict in Dummer's War

- Part of Dummer's War
Date	19 April 1723 – 28 January 1724
Location	Berwick, Maine to Mount Desert Island
Result	Franco-Wabanaki victory

Belligerents
New England Colonies	Kingdom of France; Wabanaki Confederacy

Commanders and leaders
Colonel Thomas Westbrook	Father Sébastien Rale

Strength
Unknown	Unknown

Casualties and losses
20–30 killed or captured	Unknown

The Northeast Coast campaign (1723) occurred during Dummer's War from April 19, 1723 – January 28, 1724. In response to the previous year, in which New England attacked the Wabanaki Confederacy at Norridgewock and Penobscot, the Wabanaki Confederacy retaliated by attacking the coast of present-day Maine that was below the Kennebec River, the border of Acadia. They attacked English settlements on the coast of present-day Maine between Berwick and Mount Desert Island. Casco (also known as Falmouth and Portland) was the principal settlement. The 1723 campaign was so successful along the Maine frontier that Dummer ordered its evacuation to the blockhouses in the spring of 1724.

== Historical context ==
The war occurred as a result of an expansion of New England settlements along the Kennebec River (in present-day Maine) and of the movement of more New England fishermen into Nova Scotia waters. The border between Acadia and New England, which New France defined as the Kennebec River in southern Maine. The 1713 Treaty of Utrecht, which ended Queen Anne's War and included the cession of peninsular Nova Scotia to Great Britain, had facilitated this expansion. The treaty, however, had been signed in Europe and had not involved any member of the Wabanaki tribes. None had been consulted about the expansion of British settlements, and they protested through raids on British fishermen and settlements. In response to Wabanaki hostilities toward the expansion, the governor of Massachusetts Governor Samuel Shute built forts on traditional Abenaki territory around the mouth of the Kennebec River: Fort George at Brunswick (1715), St. George's Fort at Thomaston (1720), and Fort Richmond (1721) at Richmond. The French claimed the same territory by building a church in the Abenaki village of Norridgewock (present-day Madison, Maine) on the Kennebec River, maintaining a mission at Penobscot on the Penobscot River, and building a church in the Maliseet village of Medoctec on the Saint John River. These fortifications and Catholic missions escalated the conflict.

== The campaign ==
Throughout 1723, Father Rale and the Wabanaki Confederacy of Acadia orchestrated a total of 14 raids on the New England settlements in present-day Maine. In April, there was a raid on Falmouth (present-day Portland) in which the raiders mistook Chubb to be Captain Harmen and killed him. On April 19, Scarborough was raided. They attacked the garrison house of Roger Deering. Captain Hammond and 7 others were killed. They took prisoner three adults and three of Deering's children.

In May, the natives killed two people in a raid on Berwick, one at Wells and two on the way to York.

In the summer of 1723, Norridgewocks and their 250 Indian allies from St. Francis again attacked Arrowsic. Incited by Father Rale, they burned 37 dwellings and killed 300 cattle. The 40 inhabitants fled to the garrison, with only a child lost. In August and September, there were also raids on Saco, Maine and Dover, New Hampshire. Captain Heath and 13 men including two Mohawks met with 30 natives in the Battle of Richmond. They killed two and drove off the rest. One New Englander was killed and two wounded.

In an October raid at Mount Desert, one Capt. Cogswell and his crew were surprised and taken as they were stepping ashore; and about the same time, Smith and Bailey were killed at Cape Porpoise, one on Vaughan's Island, and the other on the seashore, not far from the site of the old meeting-house.

On December 25, 60 natives again laid siege to St. George's Fort for 30 days. But Capt. Kennedy, the commanding officer, held out until Col. Westbrook arrived and put the enemy to flight. The Indians killed another man, Reverend Willard.

== Aftermath ==
During the winter, Massachusetts assigned 300 more troops to border in Maine. The government put a bounty on Father Rale's head. The Native campaign was so successful along the Maine frontier that Dummer ordered its evacuation to the blockhouses in the spring of 1724. The Confederacy waited until spring and then began another campaign against the Northeast Coast in 1724.

== See also ==
- Military history of Nova Scotia
- Northeast Coast campaign (1703)
- Northeast Coast campaign (1745)
