= Northeast Coast campaign (1703) =

Part of Queen Anne's War in New England

- Part of Queen Anne's War
Date	10 August – 6 October 1703
Location	present-day coastal Maine, from Casco Bay south
Result	French and Indian victory

Belligerents
New England	French colonists Abenaki

Commanders and leaders
Cyprian Southack; John March (wounded); Captain John Larrabee; Captain Summersby (Portsmouth); Captain Wadley (Wells); Captain Davis; Captain Richard Hunnewell (Black Point) †; Lt. Wyat (Black Point)	Alexandre Leneuf de La Vallière de Beaubassin; Father Sebastian Rale; Moxus; Wanongonet; Escumbuit; Sampson

Strength
	500 Indians; Unknown marines

Casualties and losses
Reports vary; killed captured more than 300	Approximately 15 killed; 15 captured

The Northeast Coast campaign (also known as the Six Terrible Days) (10 August – 6 October 1703) was the first major campaign by the French of Queen Anne's War in New England. Alexandre Leneuf de La Vallière de Beaubassin led 500 troops made up of French colonial forces and the Wabanaki Confederacy of Acadia (200 Mi'kmaq and others from Norridgewock). (Note: Also referred to as the "Abenaki of Acadia") They attacked English settlements on the coast of present-day Maine between Wells and Casco Bay (now the Portland, Maine area), burning more than 15 leagues of New England country and killing or capturing more than 150 people. (Note: Jesuit historian Charlevoix indicates that three hundred persons were killed or captured. Historian Francis Parkman contests this figure and states that the number is closer to 160) The English colonists protected some of their settlements, but a number of others were destroyed and abandoned. Historian Samuel Drake reported that, "Maine had nearly received her death-blow" as a result of the campaign.

== Background ==
The border area between Acadia and New England in the early 18th century remained contested after battles between French and English colonists (and their allied Native Americans) during King William's War in the 1690s failed to resolve territorial disputes. New France defined the western border of Acadia as the Kennebec River in what is now southern Maine, while the English Province of Massachusetts Bay formally claimed all of the land between the Piscataqua and St. Croix rivers (all of present-day Maine). During the 1670s, the English established settlements between the Kennebec River and Penobscot Bay, contesting claims to the area by the French and the local Abenaki people.

The French had established Catholic missions at Norridgewock and Penobscot, and there was a French settlement of long standing in Penobscot Bay near the site of modern Castine, Maine. All of these sites had been used as bases for attacks on English settlers during King William's War. The frontier areas between the Saint Lawrence River and the primarily coastal settlements of Massachusetts and New York were still dominated by natives (primarily Abenaki to the east and Iroquois in New York), and the Hudson River–Lake Champlain corridor had also been used for raiding expeditions in both directions in earlier conflicts. Although the Indian threat had receded somewhat due to reductions in the native population as a result of disease and the last war, they were still seen to pose a potent threat to outlying settlements.

Although war had broken out between France and England in 1702, the frontiers between New France and New England remained quiet until December of that year, when Governor-General Louis-Hector de Callière authorized the Abenaki to resume the border war. In addition to any plunder reaped from expeditions against the English colonies, Callière promised additional gifts. Callière died in May 1703, and was replaced by Philippe de Rigaud Vaudreuil, who vigorously promoted raiding activity as a means to maintain French influence with the Abenaki. Vaudreuil gave Alexandre Leneuf de La Vallière de Beaubassin, a military officer whose family's seigneury at Beaubassin had been raided in 1696 by New England forces, command of a small contingent of French forces and instructions to organize raids against English settlements.

Massachusetts Bay Governor Joseph Dudley did not believe that the Abenaki would go to war. In June 1703 Boston newspapers reported that the Abenaki were two thirds "for peace and one Third for warr", and Dudley had been unable to convince them to join the conflict on the English side. Abenaki chief Moxus attempted to warn Dudley of Vaudreuil's aggressive posture, but Dudley brushed off these reports.

== The campaign ==
Beaubassin's command numbered about 500, and included a small contingent of French forces. Some of the remaining were Mi'kmaq from present-day Nova Scotia and New Brunswick, and there was also a party of Kennebec from Norridgewock, which was under the direction of Father Sebastian Rale. Rigaud de Vaudreuil said later that the Abenaki were added to the expedition after Father Rale had assured him that his Indians would be "ready to take up the hatchet against the English whenever he [Vaudreuil] gave them the order."

Beaubassin divided his force into six groups. On August 10, 1703 (Old Style; August 21 New Style), they simultaneously attacked settlements at Wells, Cape Porpoise, Saco, Scarborough, Spurwink and Purpooduck (now in Cape Elizabeth), and Casco (now Portland).

=== Wells, Cape Porpoise, and Saco ===
At Wells, Beaubassin's forces killed or captured 39, while wounding many others. Another group raided Cape Porpoise, which was a desolate community inhabited principally by unshielded fishermen. At Saco, the Wabanaki killed 11 and took 24 captive. (Saco was raided again in 1704 and 1705.) They overwhelmed the garrison in the fort at Winter Harbor (in present-day Biddeford near Biddeford Pool), forcing them to submit to terms of capitulation. (Winter Harbor was raided two more times in 1707 and 1710.)

=== Scarborough ===
As the Wabanaki approached the fort at Scarborough, they sent a captive with a flag of truce. The commanding officer kept the captive and vigorously resisted a long siege. He and his men became extremely exhausted, and were on the verge of capture when he was relieved by a New England force. Resettlement of Scarborough started in 1702 when seven settlers arrived from Lynn, Massachusetts and construction began on a fort located on the western shore of Prout's Neck's Garrison's Cove. This fort was commanded by Captain John Larrabee.

The Wabanaki subsequently began tunneling into the bluff to breach the fort from below. Had it not been for a two-day downpour that made the disturbed bank slough, exposing the previously hidden excavators to snipers in the fort, the French and Native Americans might have been successful in their attempts to capture the fort and the eight people inside. But, Beaubassin retreated in search of easier prey.

Shortly after, on 6 October 200 Wabanaki went south of Falmouth to Black Point and killed or captured 19 settlers in the fields. Soon after the natives attacked the fort, which had a garrison of 8 men under the command of Lieutenant Wyatt. After a fierce resistance, the New Englanders retreated to a boat in the harbour. The Wabanaki burned the fort.

=== Casco, Spurwink and Purpooduck ===
The Wabanaki did the most damage to Spurwink and Purpooduck (Cape Elizabeth). In Spurwink, principally inhabited by the Messrs. Jordans and their families, the Wabanaki killed or captured 22. At Purpooduck, where there were nine families settled at Spring Point, they killed 25 persons and carried away eight prisoners.

The garrison of 36 men at Casco (Falmouth) was commanded by Major John March (and John Gyles was present). The fort was the "most considerable" fort on the eastern coast. On August 10, 1703, under the leadership of Moxus, Wanongonet and Escumbuit, the Wabanaki appeared unarmed and sent March a message under a flag of truce; pretending they had some important matter to communicate. Apprehending no immediate danger, he proceeded with a guard of only two or three men. The Wabanaki ambushed March and shot one of his attendants. A garrison of 10 men under Sargeant Hook rescued March and the others. The Wabanaki killed two of March's companions, Phippenny and Kent, in the altercation.

The Wabanaki withdrew and skulked around the peninsula for a week, setting fire to the houses. The rest of the Wabanaki warriors, arrived at Casco in 200 canoes to continue the destruction of the village. They first took a sloop, two shallops, and considerable plunder; encouraged by success, they attempted for two days and nights, to undermine the fort from the water side, as was done during King William's War. On 19 August Captain Cyprian Southack arrived on the Province Galley (ship) and relieved the siege. The natives continued to stroll around Casco. They boarded a store ship and killed the captain and three others, while wounding two others.

On 26 September, Governor Dudley ordered 360 men to march toward Pigwacket, one of the main native villages, located at present-day Fryeburg, Maine. Leading 300 New Englanders, Major March chased the Wabanaki back to Pigwacket. March killed 6 and captured 6. These were the first New England reprisals of the war.

=== York ===
At the same time, under the leadership of Chief Sampson, a group of Wabanaki went south of Falmouth to York and Berwick. At York, they killed the seven members of the Arthur Bragdon family, and took a widow and her daughter into captivity. (The following spring of 1704, after the Raid on Deerfield in February, the Wabanaki again attacked and killed settlers at York. In 1712, the Wabanaki conducted another campaign against these villages and towns. They killed or captured 24 people in three raids in three villages, one of which was York.)

=== Berwick ===
Another party moved on to Berwick, ambushing a group of five New Englanders, killing one, wounding another and taking three captive. They attacked the fort, under the command of Captain Brown. The New Englanders repulsed the attack, killing 9 and wounding 9 of the Wabanaki. In retaliation, the natives took a man and burned him alive on a stake.

== Aftermath ==
In response to their losses in the campaign, the French and natives attacked Deerfield. The French also wanted to capture a high-ranking man to use in a prisoner exchange. In the spring of 1704, after the raid on Deerfield in February, the Wabanaki again attacked Wells and York. (In 1712, the Wabanaki conducted another campaign against these villages and towns. They killed or captured 24 people in three raids on three villages, one of which was Wells.)

In response to these events and the sack of Deerfield, the governors of the northern English colonies called for action against the French colonies. Massachusetts Governor Joseph Dudley wrote that "the destruction of Quebeck and Port Royal [would] put all the Navall stores into Her Majesty's hands, and forever make an end of an Indian War", the frontier between Deerfield and Wells was fortified by upwards of 2,000 men, and the bounty for Indian scalps was more than doubled, from £40 to £100. Dudley promptly organized a retaliatory raid against Acadia. In the summer of 1704, New Englanders under the leadership of Benjamin Church raided Acadian villages at Pentagouet (present-day Castine, Maine), Passamaquoddy Bay (present-day St. Stephen, New Brunswick), Grand Pré, Pisiquid, and Beaubassin (all in present-day Nova Scotia).

There were also reprisals by the New Englanders against Norridgewock. During the winter of 1705, 275 soldiers under the command of Colonel Hilton were sent to Norridgewock to seize Father Rale and sack the village. Father Rale escaped them, but they burned his church.

John March led an expedition against the Acadian capital of Port Royal in 1707.

The French drew off a great number of Indian families from the Penobscot, Norridgewock, Saco, and Pequaket tribes, and settled them at St. Francis, Canada, as a protection against the Iroquois Confederacy. These were called the St. Francis Indians.

By the end of the war, natives were successful in killing more than 700 British and capturing over 250 along the Acadia/ New England border.

== See also ==
- Military history of Nova Scotia
- Northeast Coast campaign (1723)
- Northeast Coast campaign (1745)
- Military history of the Mi’kmaq people
