= Caleffi =

Caleffi is an Italian surname, either originating from the name Caleb or from the name of the city of Aleppo, Syria (Arabic: Ḥalab), or alternatively from caleffare 'to make fun' or calafatare 'to caulk'. Notable people with the name include:

- Giovanna Berneri (née Caleffi; 1897–1962), Italian educationalist and libertarian anarchist
- Sonya Caleffi (born 1970), Italian serial killer

== See also ==
- Calef
- Caleff
- Galeffi
