= Captain Gibson =

Captain Gibson may refer to:

- James Gibson (seaman) (1700–1752), British sea captain, soldier, and merchant
- Julie Ann Gibson (born 1956), British Royal Air Force captain
- Robert L. Gibson (born 1946), American naval captain and NASA astronaut
- Walter M. Gibson (1822–1888), American adventurer and ship's captain
