= Siege of Louisbourg (1745) =

1745 siege of the War of the Austrian Succession

- Part of the War of the Austrian Succession
- New England troops landing on 11 May to besiege Louisbourg
Date	12 May – 28 June 1745
Location	Louisbourg, Île-Royale, French Canada 45°55′17″N 59°58′13″W
Result	British victory

Belligerents
Great Britain; New England Colonies	France

Commanders and leaders
William Pepperrell; Peter Warren; John Bradstreet; Edward Tyng	Louis Duchambon (surrendered); Pierre Morpain (surrendered); Joseph la Malgue

Strength
4,200; 90 warships and transport ships	2,390

Casualties and losses
100 killed and wounded 900 dead of disease	130 killed and wounded 300 dead of disease 1,400 captured

The siege of Louisbourg was the 1745 capture of the French settlement of Louisbourg on present-day Cape Breton Island, Nova Scotia, by British North American forces during the War of the Austrian Succession, known as King George's War in the British colonies. The Fortress of Louisbourg was taken with the aid of a British fleet. The northern British colonies regarded Louisbourg, the capital of the French province of Île-Royale, as a menace, calling it the "American Dunkirk" due to its use as a base for privateers. There was regular, intermittent warfare between the French and the Wabanaki Confederacy on one side and the northern New England colonies on the other (See the Northeast Coast Campaigns of 1688, 1703, 1723, 1724).

For the French, the Fortress of Louisbourg also protected the chief entrance to Canada, as well as the nearby French fisheries. The French government had spent 25 years in fortifying it, and the cost of its defenses was reckoned at thirty million livres. Although the fortress's construction and layout was acknowledged as having superior seaward defences, a series of low rises behind them made it vulnerable to a land attack. The low rises provided attackers places to erect siege batteries. The fort's garrison was poorly paid and supplied, and its inexperienced leaders mistrusted them. The colonial attackers were also lacking in experience, but ultimately succeeded in gaining control of the surrounding defences. The defenders surrendered in the face of an imminent assault.

Louisbourg was an important bargaining chip in the peace negotiations to end the war, since it represented a major British success. Factions within the British government were opposed to returning it to the French as part of any peace agreement. These were eventually overruled, and Louisbourg was returned, over the objections of the victorious British North Americans, to French control after the 1748 Treaty of Aix-la-Chapelle, in return for French concessions elsewhere.

== Context ==
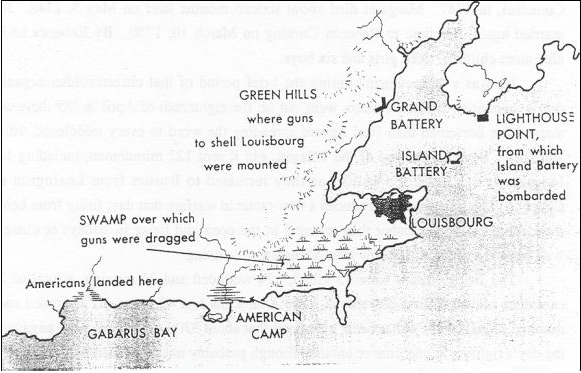
Siege Of Louisbourg 1745

From 1688 onward a number of military campaigns had been fought between the French and their allies and the English in the region. Under the Treaty of Utrecht, which ended the War of the Spanish Succession, the French colony of Acadia had been ceded to Great Britain. The tribes of Wabanaki Confederacy had a long history of raiding British settlements along Northern New England in present-day Maine. During the 17th and early-18th century, the Wabanaki fought in several campaigns, including in 1688, 1703, 1723, 1724. (Note: The focus of the raids were the towns on the Northern New England border: A line drawn from Falmouth, now Portland, on Casco Bay, by the towns Scarborough, Saco, Wells, York, Amesbury, Haverhill, Andover, Dunstable, Chelmsford, Groton, Lancaster, and Worcester constituted the frontier of Massachusetts, which then included Maine.) Many of the British military leaders of the siege of Louisbourg came from Northern New England, whose family members were killed in the raids.

In the summer of 1744, New Englanders' concerns of further attacks on the Northern New England increased after a French and Wabanaki force sailed from Louisbourg to the nearby British fishing port of Canso, attacking a small fort on Grassy Island and burned it to the ground, taking prisoner 50 British families. This port was used by the New England fishing fleet; however, the Canso Islands (including Grassy Island) were contested by both Britain and France.

The prisoners taken during the Canso raid were first brought to Louisbourg, where they were given freedom to move around. Some of the military men took careful note of the fortress design, layout, and condition, as well as the size and condition of its garrison and armaments. These men were eventually released to Boston, where their intelligence, along with that provided by merchants who did business at Louisbourg, proved useful in planning the attack.

The French, army and civilian alike, were not in the best of condition at Louisbourg. Supplies were short in 1744, and the fishermen were reluctant to sail without adequate provisions. The military rank and file claimed that they were promised a share of the spoils from the Canso raid, which had instead gone to officers, who sold those same provisions and profited in the endeavour. In December 1744, the troops mutinied over the poor conditions and pay that was months overdue. Even after acting Governor Louis Du Pont Du Chambon managed to quiet the discontent by releasing back pay and supplies, the following winter was extremely tense, as the military leadership maintained a tenuous hold on the situation. Duchambon was even reluctant to send for help, fearing the message would be intercepted and spark further unrest. Word of the unrest did, however, make its way to Boston.

In 1745, the governor of the Province of Massachusetts Bay, William Shirley, secured by a narrow margin the support of the Massachusetts legislature for an attack on the fortress. He and the governor of the Province of New Hampshire, Benning Wentworth, sought the support of other colonies. Connecticut provided 500 troops, New Hampshire 450, Rhode Island a ship, New York ten cannons, and Pennsylvania and New Jersey funds. The force was under the command of William Pepperrell of Kittery (in the portion of the Massachusetts colony that is now the state of Maine), and a fleet of colonial ships was assembled and placed under the command of Captain Edward Tyng. Governor Shirley sent to Commodore Peter Warren, the chief officer of the Royal Navy's West Indies station, a request for naval support in the event of an encounter with French warships, which would significantly outclass any of the colonial ships. Warren at first declined this offer, lacking authorization from London to assist. Only a few days later, he received orders from the Admiralty to proceed to protect the New England fisheries. The expedition set sail from Boston in stages beginning in early March 1745 with 4,200 soldiers and sailors aboard a total of 90 ships.

== Battle ==
=== Canso and Port Toulouse ===
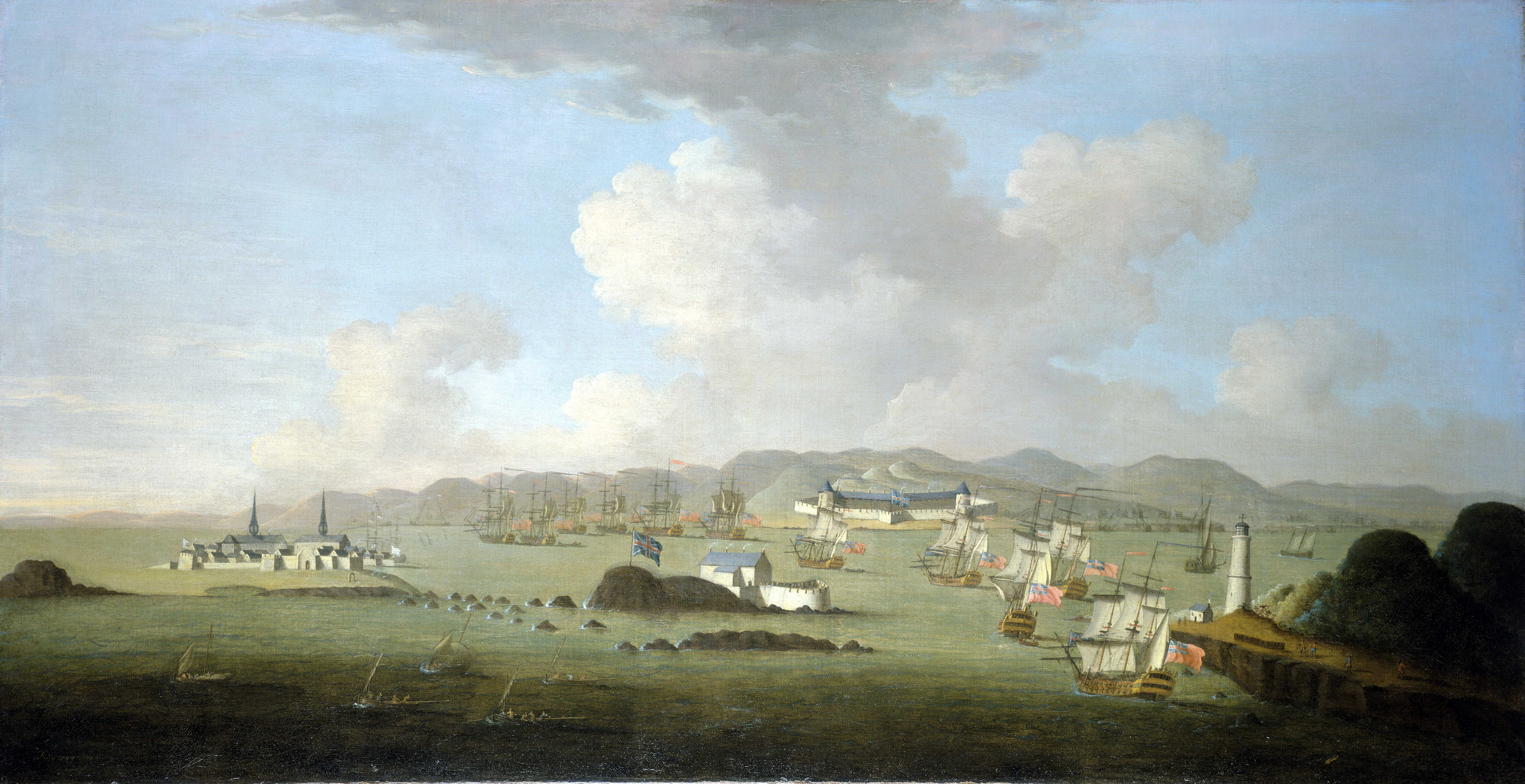
The Capture of Louisburg, 1745 by Peter Monamy

The force stopped at Canso to reprovision. There they were met by Commodore Warren, enlarging the expedition by 16 ships. In late March, the naval forces began to blockade Louisbourg, however ice fields were being swept from the Gulf of St. Lawrence to the seas off Louisbourg that spring, presenting a considerable hazard to wooden-hulled sailing ships. The poor weather and general state of disorganization of the New England naval forces resulted in numerous delays to the expedition, however, they kept busy harassing French fishing and shipping in the waters surrounding Île-Royale.

With the ice fields gone by late April, the siege began in earnest. Pepperell's land forces sailed in transports from Canso. On May 2, he besieged Port Toulouse (present-day St. Peter's, Nova Scotia) as well as destroying several coastal villages in the area between Canso and Louisbourg.

=== Landing ===
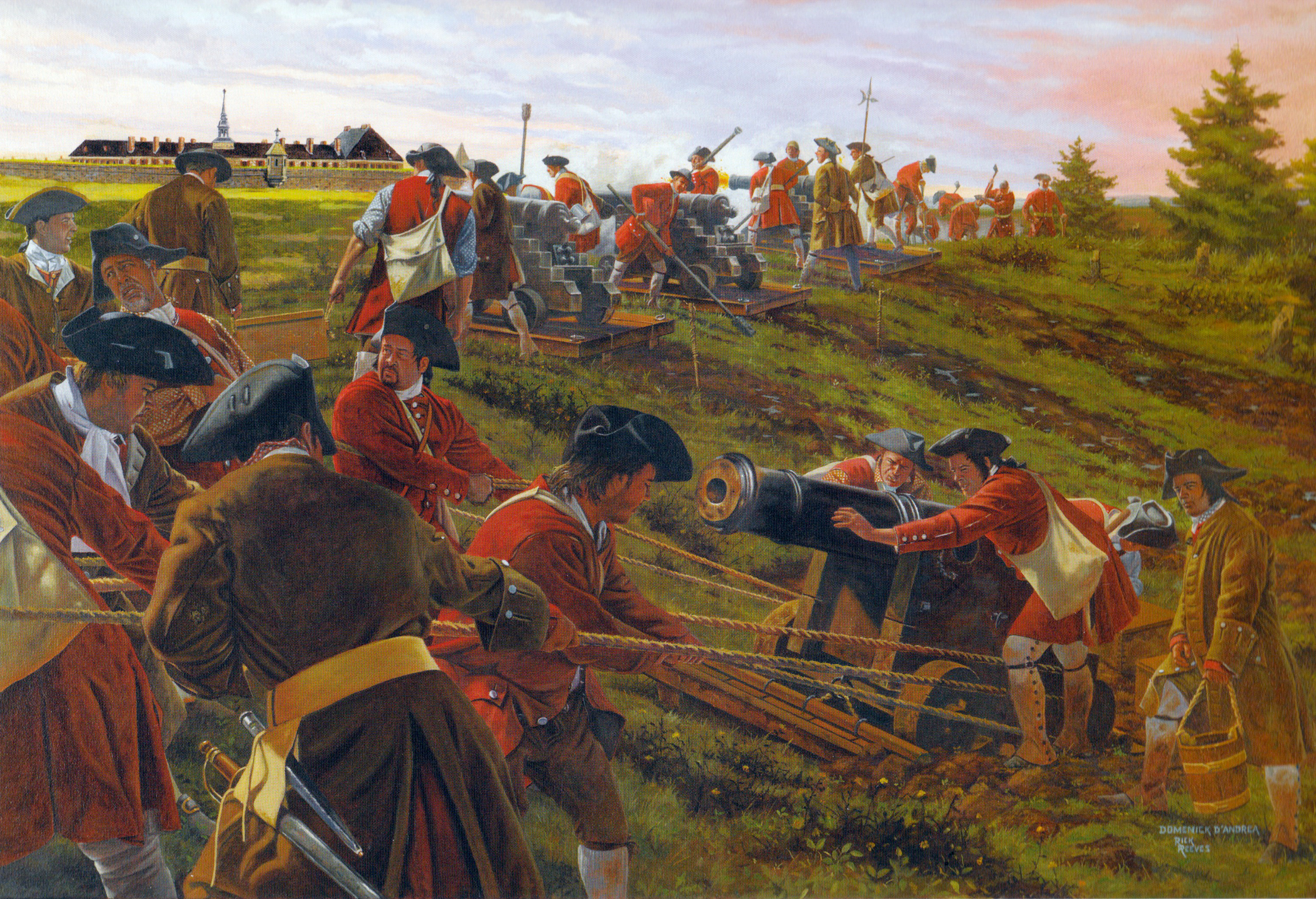
Provincial troops during the siege

On May 11, John Gorham and his rangers led the charge to land troops on the shores close to the fortress. They tried to land their whale boats at Flat Point Cover while covered by the fire power of the Lord Montague, Boston Packet and Massachusetts. Gorham was repelled by 20 French troops that occupied the cove. Gorham quickly regrouped with several other vessels and the operation was re-directed to Kennington Cove. The French troops were unable to re-position themselves in time to stop the landing of provincial troops. After 1,500 provincials were already on shore, 200 French troops under Pierre Morpain and De la Boularderie arrived to repel them. Morpain retreated while De La Boularderie gave himself up as a prisoner. 2,000 provincial troops would be landed by the end of the day.

=== Destroying the fisheries ===
While most of the troops were employed at attacking the Royal Battery, the Island Battery and Fortress Louisbourg, others were scouting around the perimeter of the fortress, destroying small fishing villages. On May 8, the Mi'kmaq defended against an attack on near-by Margaret's Bay and killed seven of Warren's troops. On May 11, the provincials killed or took prisoner 17 French troops while suffering three men wounded.

On May 19, Edward Tyng in the snow Prince of Orange along with the ship Massachusetts destroyed St. Ann's Bay, burning the town and shipping. They killed 20 people and took 25 prisoners. The French killed one provincial soldier. On May 21, the Prince of Orange was joined by the Defence, and together they destroyed Ingonish, burning a town of 80 houses. They continued on to destroy the towns of Bradore and Bayonne.

On May 23, a 20-man detachment from Jeremiah Moulton's regiment attacked a small village. While they were in the village, they were surrounded by 100 French soldiers and Mi'kmaq tribesmen, who killed all but two of the detachment.

On May 30, the Mi'kmaq at Chapeau Rouge (L'Ardoise) attacked 13 provincial soldiers from Captain Fletcher's crew on the Boston Packet, who were seeking wood and water. They killed seven provincial soldiers, three of whom were scalped. They also took three prisoners, two of whom were later found butchered and one later died of wounds.

On June 24, the Defence and the Boston Packet sent a plundering expedition on shore near "Laten".

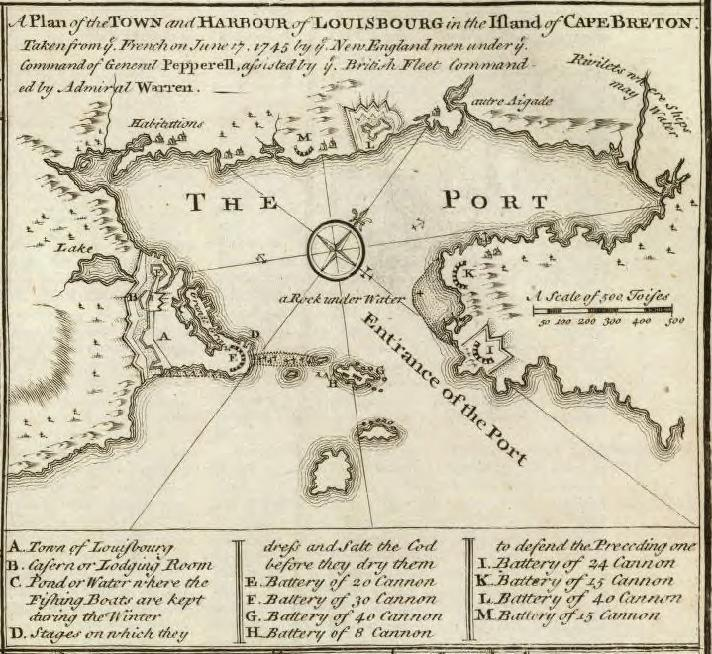
Map of the siege of Louisbourg, 1745.

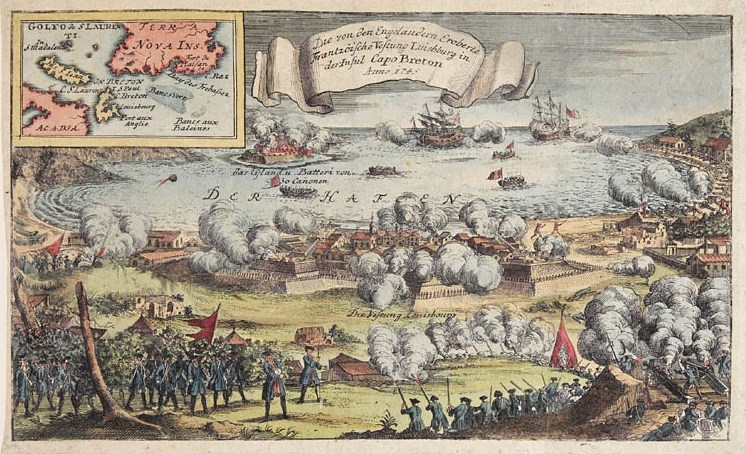
The Capture of Louisburg, 28 June 1745

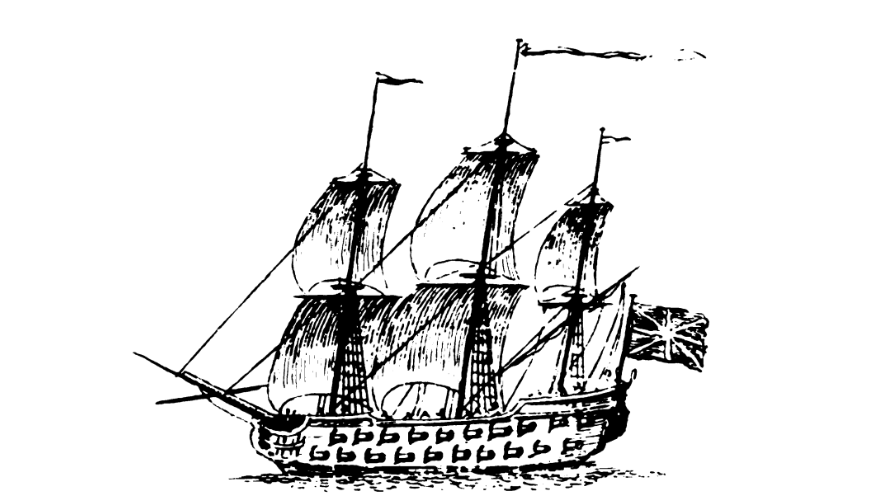
Commanded by Tyng – Massachusetts, flagship for siege of Louisbourg, 1745

=== Royal (Grand) Battery ===
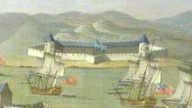
Royal Battery, Capture of Louisbourg 1745 (inset) by Peter Monamy

Upon landing, the provincial forces immediately launched an attack on the North East Harbour (present-day Louisbourg, Nova Scotia). The act terrorized the French and they abandoned the Royal Battery with much of its armaments still operational. The provincials immediately occupied the battery and began firing at the fortress. They repulsed a French and Indian attempt to re-take the battery the following day.

=== Island Battery ===
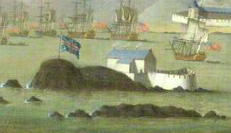
Island Battery, Capture of Louisbourg 1745 (inset) by Peter Monamy

The Island Battery was the most formidable and took the New Englanders six weeks to silence. The Island Battery, which had a garrison of 160 men, needed to be defeated before the Royal Navy could enter the harbour. On May 26, 100 provincial troops under the command of Samuel Waldo turned the cannons of the Royal Battery on the Island Battery and bombarded the battery for days. On June 6, Captain Brooks led 400 provincial troops against the Island Battery and were repulsed by the French troops. The French killed 60 of Brook's soldiers and took 116 prisoner.

==== 5th failed attack ====
Later on June 7, Gorham commanded 650 troops to attack but was forced to retreat. The French killed 189 New Englanders in the failed assault.

On June 9, 100 provincials troops fought 100 French troops and 80 Indians. The provincials killed 40 men and took 17 prisoner while suffering six killed and several more wounded.

==== Careening Wharf Battle ====
Gorham and 40 rangers discovered 30 French cannon at the Careening Wharf on June 9. The next day, the French Governor Du Chambon sent 100 inexperienced French troops under the command of Sieur de Beaubassin. Gorham and his rangers were able to launch a surprise attack on the French troops, killing five of them. One of Gorham's (Indian) rangers was killed. (By June 11 (new style), Beaubassin's force was decimated with many Mi'kmaw fighters killed.)

==== Gorham's Battery ====
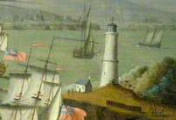
Gorham's Battery (Lighthouse Point), Capture of Louisbourg 1745 (inset) by Peter Monamy (1681–1749)

By June 21, Gorham had built a battery at Lighthouse Point. He had hauled ten cannon from the Royal Battery. He shelled the Island Battery for five days and on June 27 the French Battery was silenced.

=== Surrender ===
On June 27, French and native reinforcements led by Paul Marin were prevented from reaching Louisbourg in the Naval battle off Tatamagouche. The New Englanders' landward siege was supported by Commodore Warren's fleet and, following 47 days (six weeks and five days) of siege and bombardment, the French capitulated on June 28, 1745.

== Aftermath ==
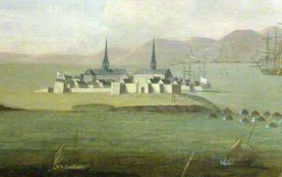
Fortress Louisbourg, Capture of Louisbourg 1745 (inset) by Peter Monamy

News of the victory reached Governor Shirley in Boston on July 3 which, coincidentally, was commencement day at Harvard (usually a day of celebration in itself). All of New England celebrated the taking of France's mighty fortress on the Atlantic. Losses to the New England forces in battle had been modest, although the garrison that occupied the fortress during the following winter suffered many deaths from cold and disease. After the fall of Louisbourg, the New Englanders also assumed control of Port-La-Joye on present-day Prince Edward Island (which the French regained in battle the following year). Despite the British conquest of Louisbourg, the French and Wabanaki attacks continued on Northern New England in the campaigns of 1745, 1746, and 1747.

Duchambon's actions in the mutiny and siege were the subject of inquiries upon his return to France in August 1745. Duchambon was protected from reprisals by the actions of François Bigot, Louisbourg's intendant, who deflected much of the blame onto others. Duchambon retired from the service with a pension in March 1746. Pepperrell and Warren were both richly rewarded for their efforts. Warren, in addition to profiting from prize money, was promoted to rear admiral. Pepperrell was made a baronet by King George II and given a commission as colonel of a new regiment, numbered 66th at the time (but not to be confused with the later 66th Regiment of Foot). Shirley was also given a colonel's commission to raise his own regiment.

Both France and Britain planned expeditions to North America in the wake of the capture. The Duc d'Anville expedition, led by Admiral Jean Baptiste de La Rochefoucauld, Duke of Anville, was dispatched from France in 1746 to retake Louisbourg and Acadia from the British. However, it was destroyed by storms, disease, and British naval attacks and never reached the fortress. The British government made plans, based on suggestions by Shirley and Warren, for a follow-up expedition to seize Quebec. For a variety of reasons, including a late start and contrary winds, the 1746 expedition did not leave European waters, and was instead diverted to raid the French port of Lorient. Although the idea was also considered for the 1747 campaign season, it again failed to bear fruit. When the war ended with the signing of the Treaty of Aix-la-Chapelle in 1748, Louisbourg was returned to France in exchange for the return of Madras to Britain, and the withdrawal of French troops from the Low Countries. The decision to withdraw from Louisbourg came under fierce attacks in London from opponents of the Pelham Ministry, but it went ahead nonetheless. In 1758 the fortress was captured again by the British during the Seven Years' War, this time permanently, as Île-Royale and much of New France was ceded to Britain under the terms of the 1763 Treaty of Paris.

== French naval officers ==
- Chevalier Guy-François de Coëtnempren (Comte de Kersaint), (Renommee)

== New England Provincial Troops: Officers ==
=== Maine ===
1. York County, Maine - William Pepperell's Regiment (1st Massachusetts Regiment)

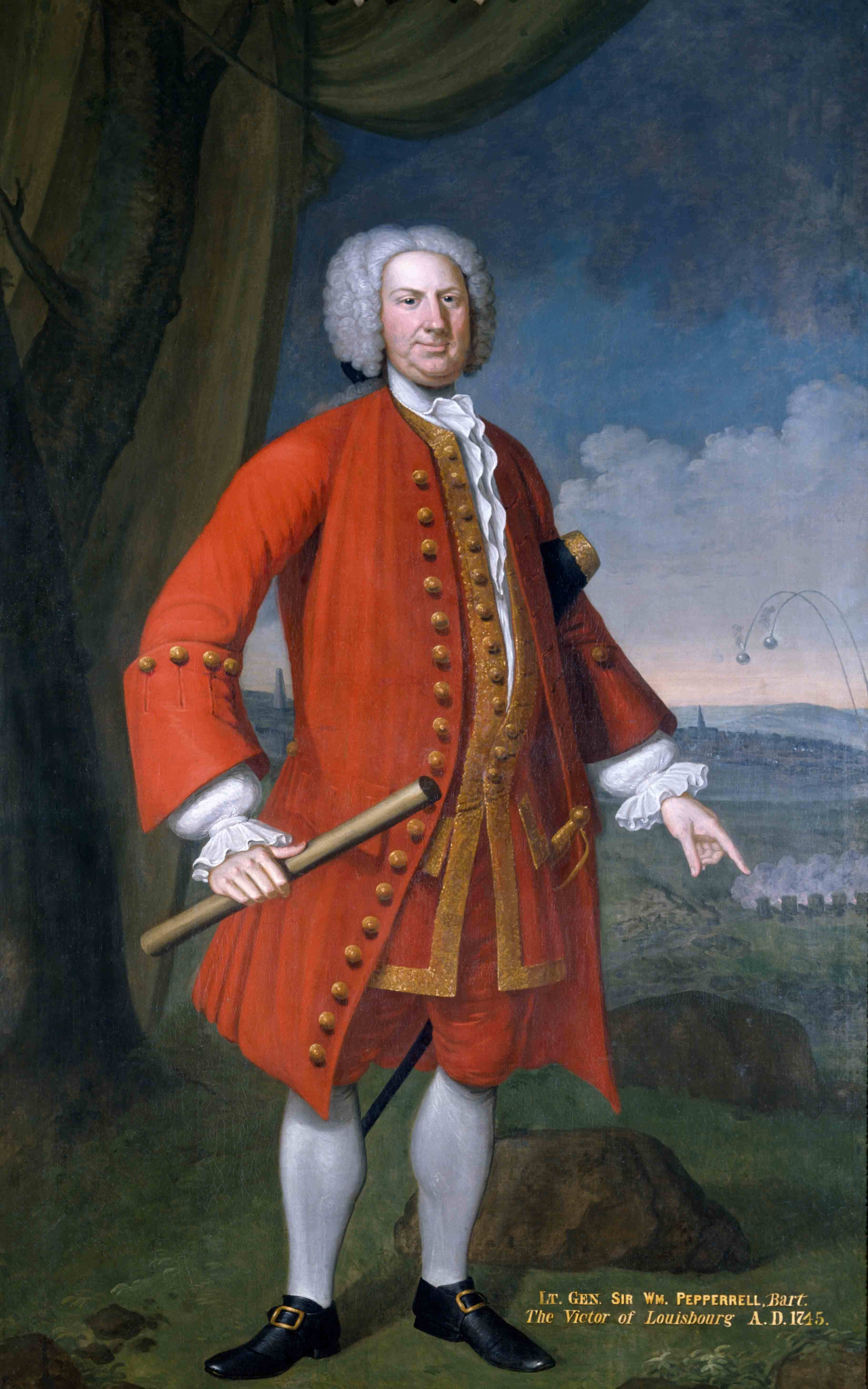
William Pepperell of Kittery Point, Maine

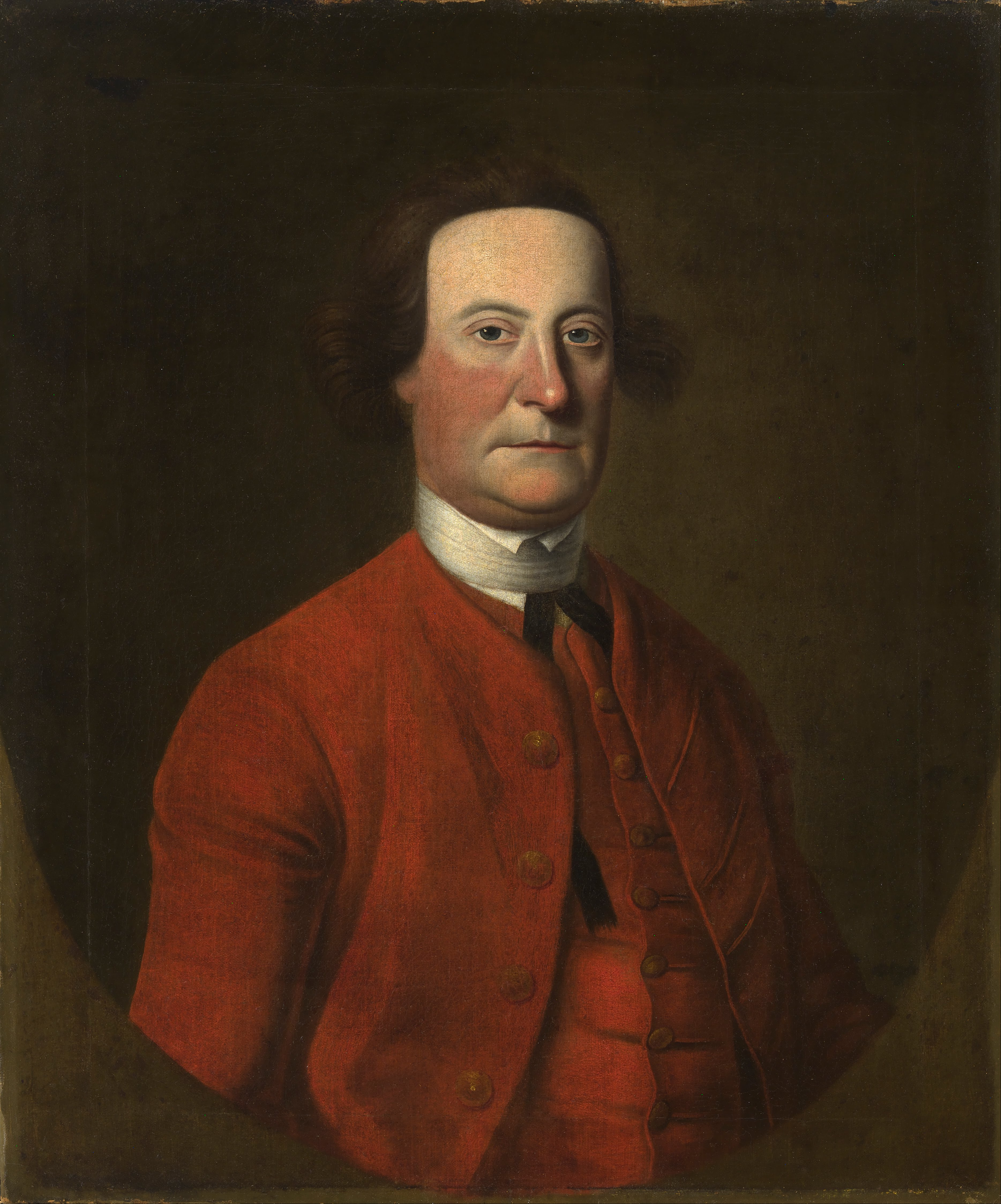
John Bradstreet

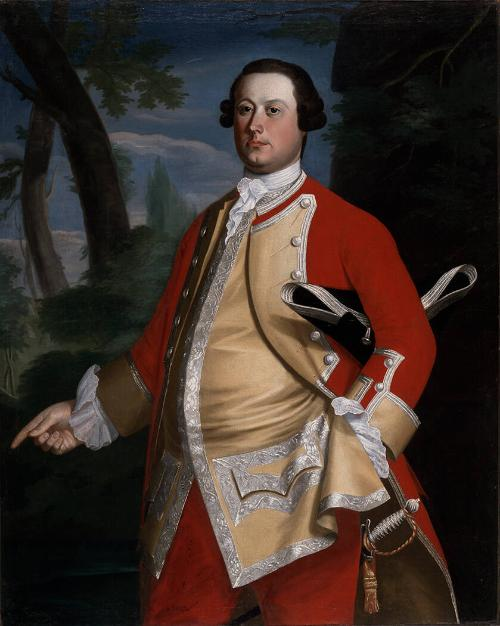
Joshua Winslow, Lieut. in Regiment

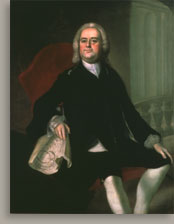
Benjamin Green, served as secretary in the regiment
- Colonel Bradstreet, Lieut Colonel Storer, Major Cutts, Captain Peter Staples, Captain Ephraim Baker, Captain John Fairfield, Captain Bray Dearing, Captain Kinslagh, Captain John Harmon, Captain Moses Butler, Captain Thomas Perkins, Captain William Warner, Captain Moses Pearson, Private John Morey

2. York County, Maine - Colonel Jeremiah Moulton's Regiment (3rd Massachusetts Regiment)

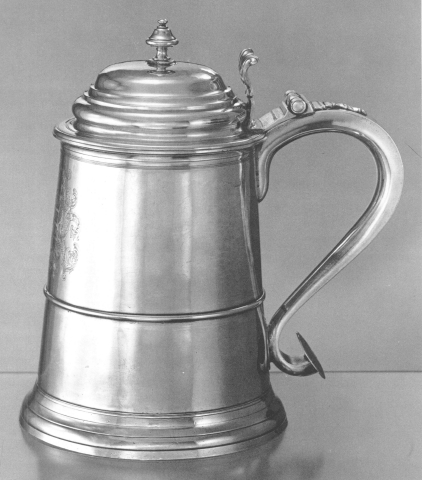
Jeremiah Moulton of York, Maine, Silver tankard given to him by William Pepperrell after siege.

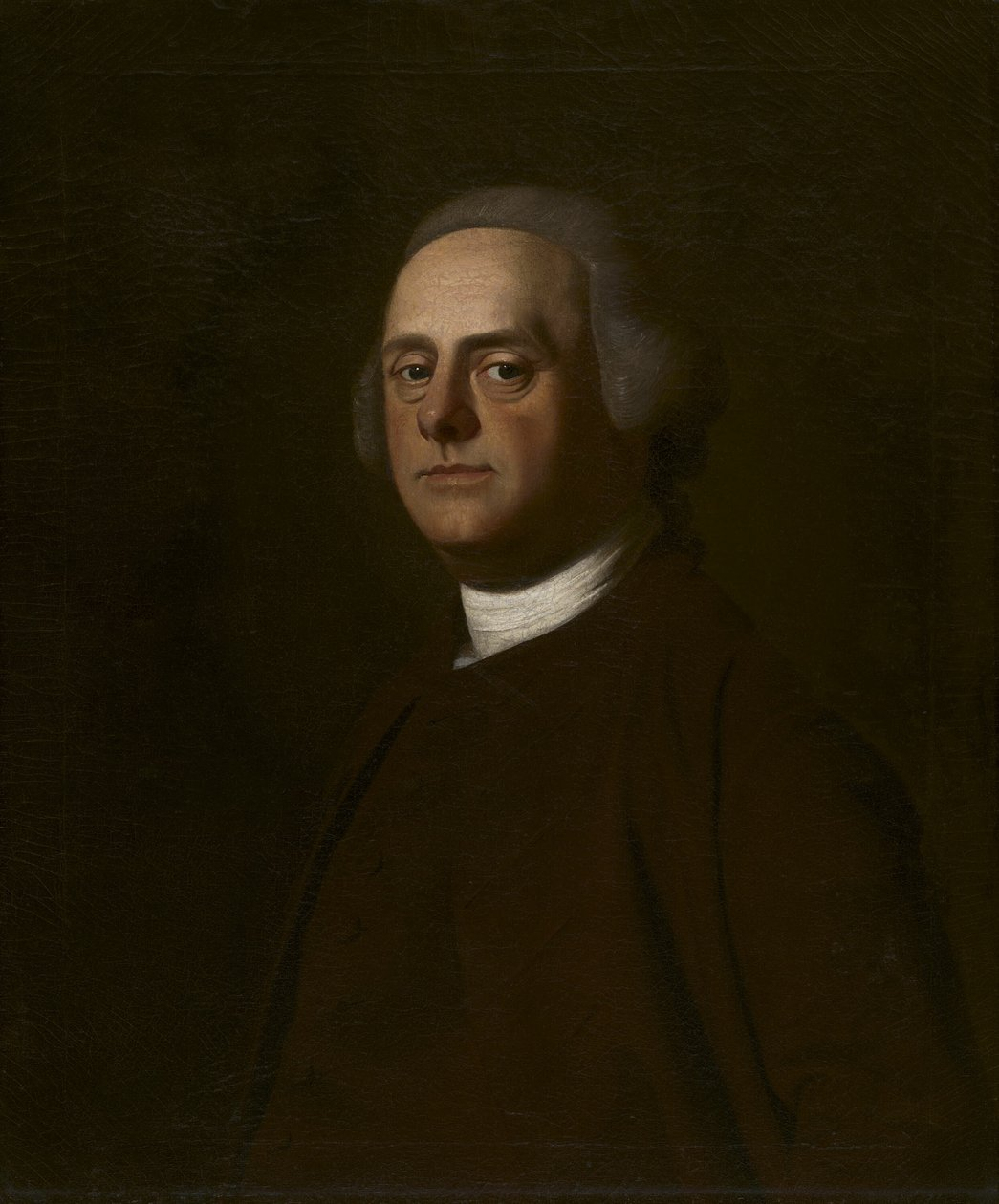
Joseph Gerrish
- Lieut. Colonel Connell; Major Ellis; Captain John Card, Captain John Lane, Christopher Marshall, Captain James Grant, Captain Charles King, Captain Peter Prescott (killed), Captain Ami R. Cutter, Captain Samuel Rhodes, Captain Bartholomew Trow, Captain Estes Hatch

3. Cumberland County, Maine - Colonel Samuel Waldo's Regiment (2nd Massachusetts Regiment)

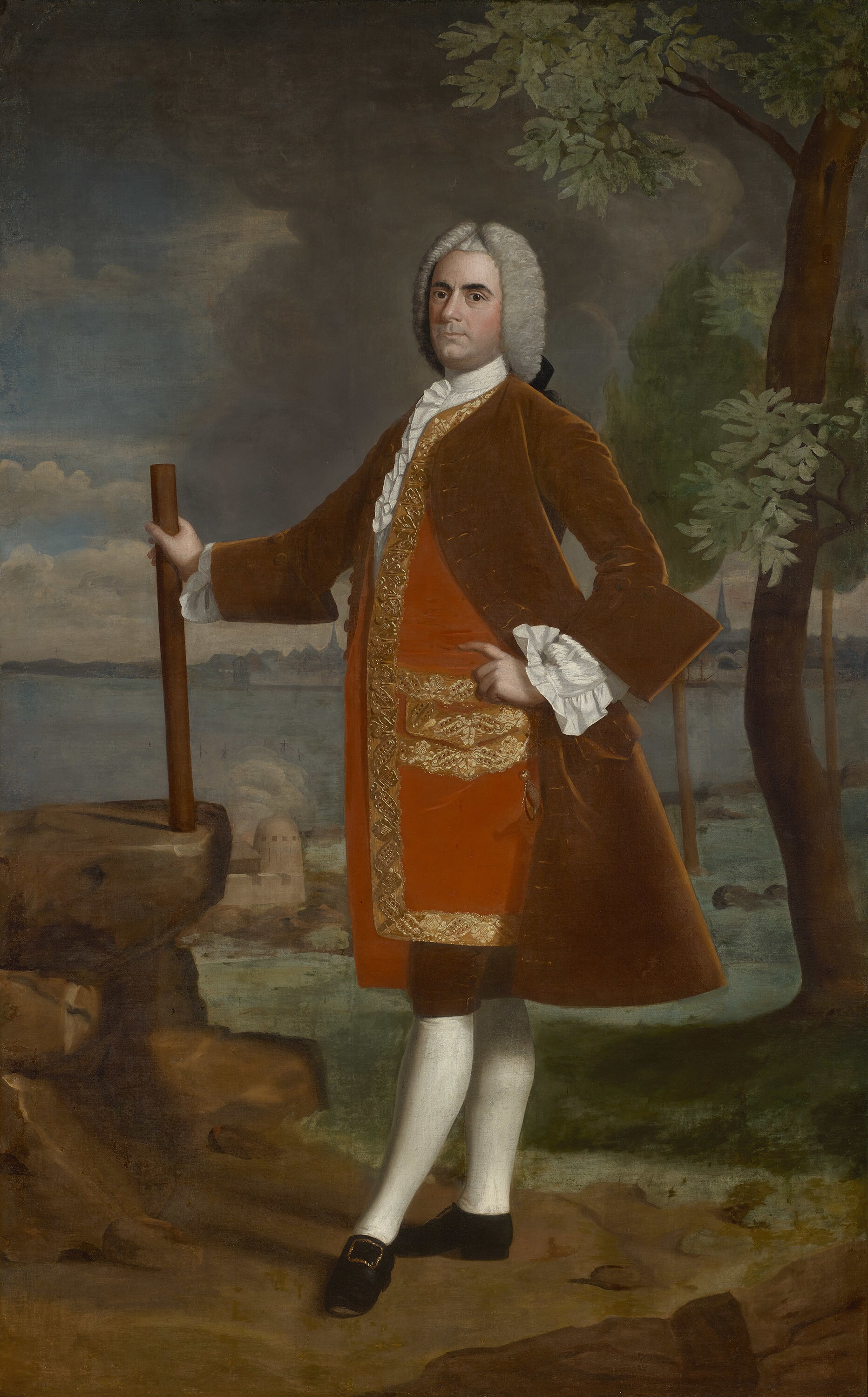
Colonel Samuel Waldo of Boston

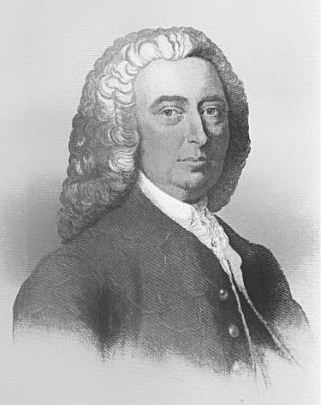
Lieut. Colonel Arthur Noble

Captain Benjamin Goldthwait Signature
- Lieut. Colonel Noble, Major William Hunt, Captains Samuel Moody, John Watts, Philip Damarisque, Daniel Hale (wounded), Jacob Stevens, James Noble, Richard Jacques, Captain Daniel Fogg, Joseph Richardson (kept journal)

4. Bristol, Maine - Colonel Sylvester Richmond's Regiment (6th Massachusetts Regiment)

- Major Thomas Morey, Esq., Lieut. Colonel Pitts, Major Hodges, Captains Nathaniel Bosworth, Thomas Gilbert, Josiah Pratt, Robert Swan, Ebenezer Eastman, Cornelius Sole, John Lawrence, Nathaniel Williams, Ebenezer Nichols, Jeremiah Weston

=== New Hampshire ===
5. New Hampshire – Colonel Samuel Moore (military officer)'s Regiment (of Portsmouth)

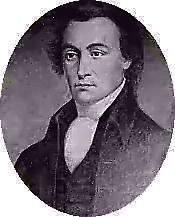
Dr. Matthew Thornton, New Hampshire Regiment

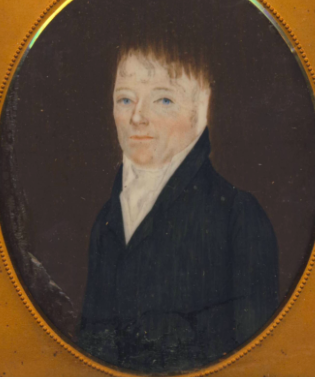
Dr. Jonathan Prescott

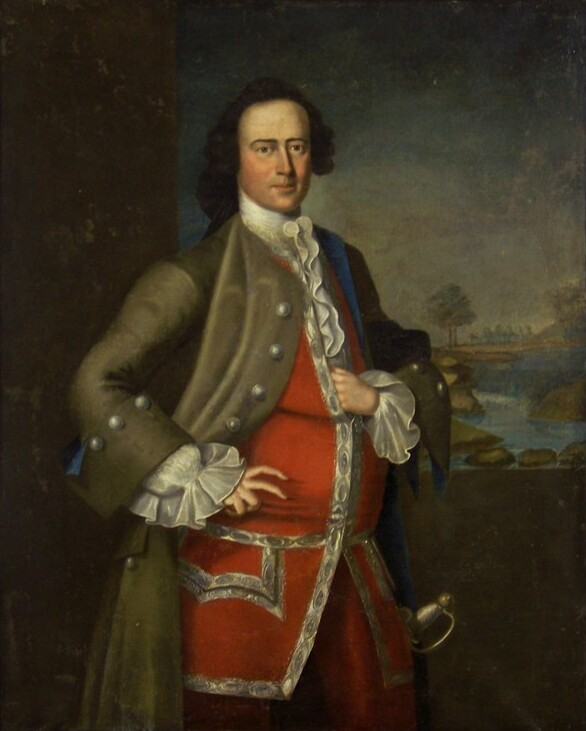
Thomas Westbrook Waldron
- Lieut. Colonel Nathaniel Meserve, Major Ezekiah Gilman; Captains Samuel Whitten, William Waldron, True Dudley, Tufton Mason, William Seaward, Daniel Ladd, Joseph Sherbrune (wrote journal), John Turnel, Samuel Hale, Jacob Tilton, Edward Williams
- Roll of New Hampshire Men at Louisburg, Cape Breton, 1745 By New Hampshire. Commissioner at Louisburg Celebration, 1895

=== Connecticut ===
6. Connecticut – Major General Roger Wolcott's Regiment

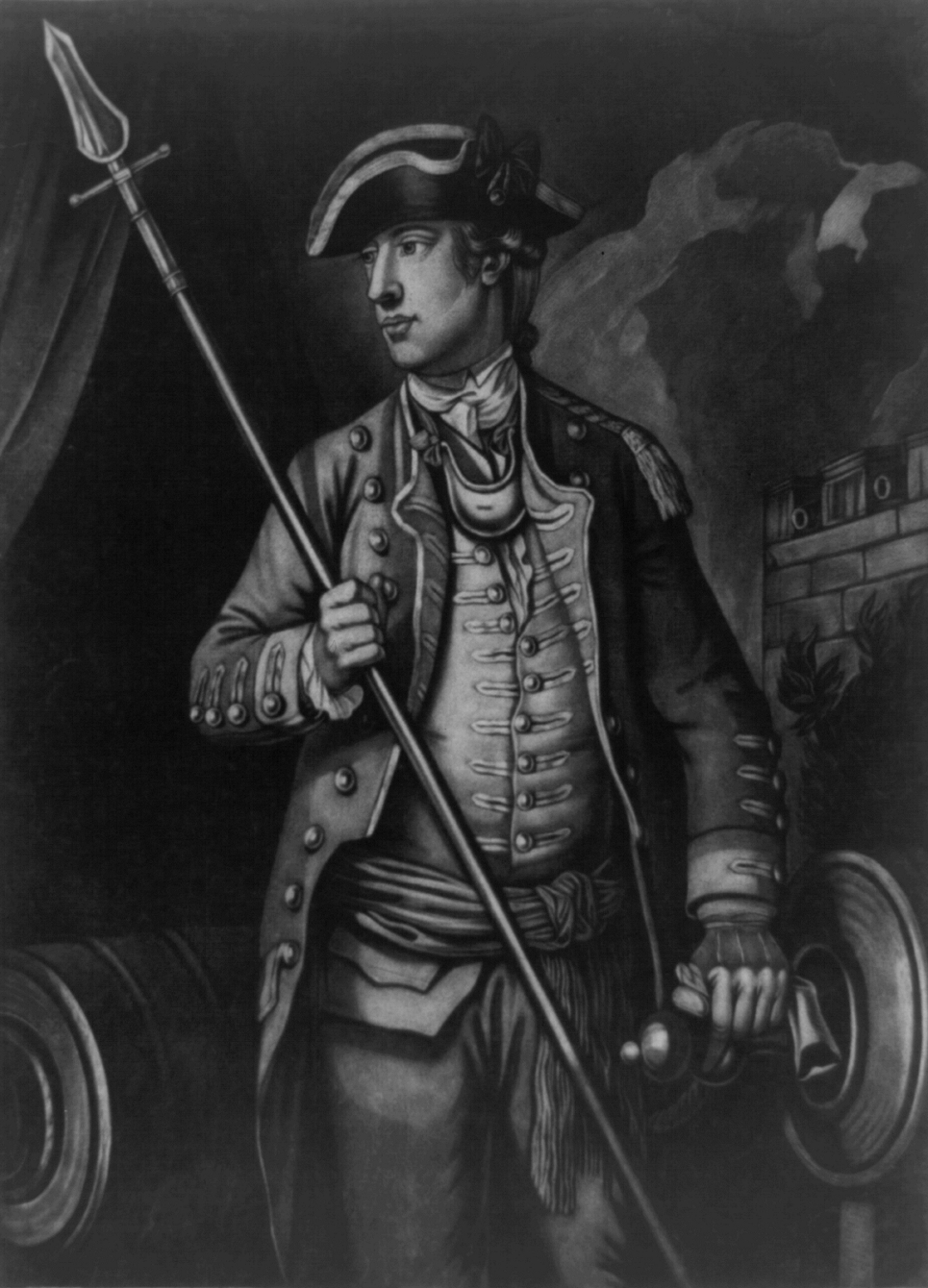
David Wooster
- Wolcott of Windsor, Connecticut; Col Andrew Burr; Lieut Col. Simon Lothrop; Major Goodridge; Major Israel Newton (killed); Captain David Wooster, Captain Stephen Lee, Captain Daniel Chapman, Captain William Whiting, Captain Robert Dennison, Captain Andrew Ward; Captain James Church, Captain Henry King

=== Massachusetts ===
7. Worcester, Massachusetts - Colonel Samuel Willard (military officer)'s Regiment (4th Massachusetts Regiment)

- Lieut. Col. Chandler, Major Seth Pomroy, Captains Joshua Pierce (killed), John /Terry, John Alexander, David Melvin, John Warner, Jabez (Omsteads) Homestead, Joseph Miller (wounded), James Goulding, James Stephens

8. Essex County, Massachusetts - Colonel Robert Hale (military officer)'s Regiment (5th Massachusetts Regiment)

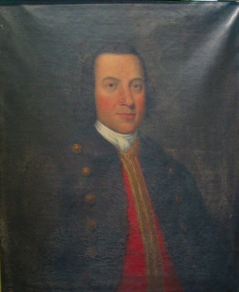
Moses Titcomb (1707–1755) (attributed to Joseph Blackburn); 'North-Western' or 'Titcomb's Battery.'
- Lieut. Colonel Edward Eveleigh, Major Moses Titcomb, Captains Benjamin Ives, Daniel Eveleigh, Titcomb, John Dodge, Jonathan Bagley, Jeremiah Foster, Samuel Davis, Thomas Stanford, Charles Byles

9. Brigadier Joseph Dwight's Regiment - Colonel of Artillery, (9th Massachusetts Regiment)

- Lieut. Col Thomas, Major Samuel Gardner, Captain George Morey

10. Colonel Shubael Gorham's Regiment (7th Massachusetts Regiment)

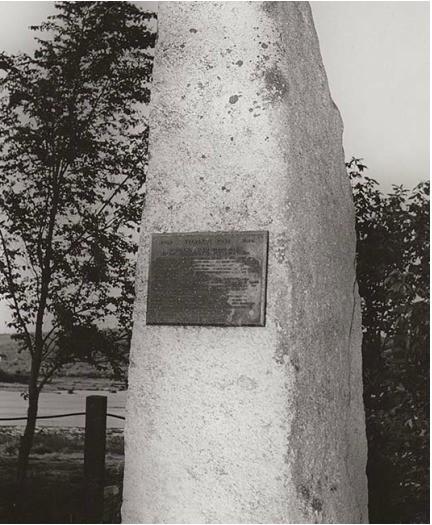
Silvanus Cobb
- Major Joseph Thatcher, Captains Jonathan Carey, Elisha Doane, Sylvester Cobb, Israel Bailey, Edward Demmick/ Dimmock (killed), Gerhom Bradford, Samuel Lombard

== British and New England naval officers ==
=== Royal Navy ===
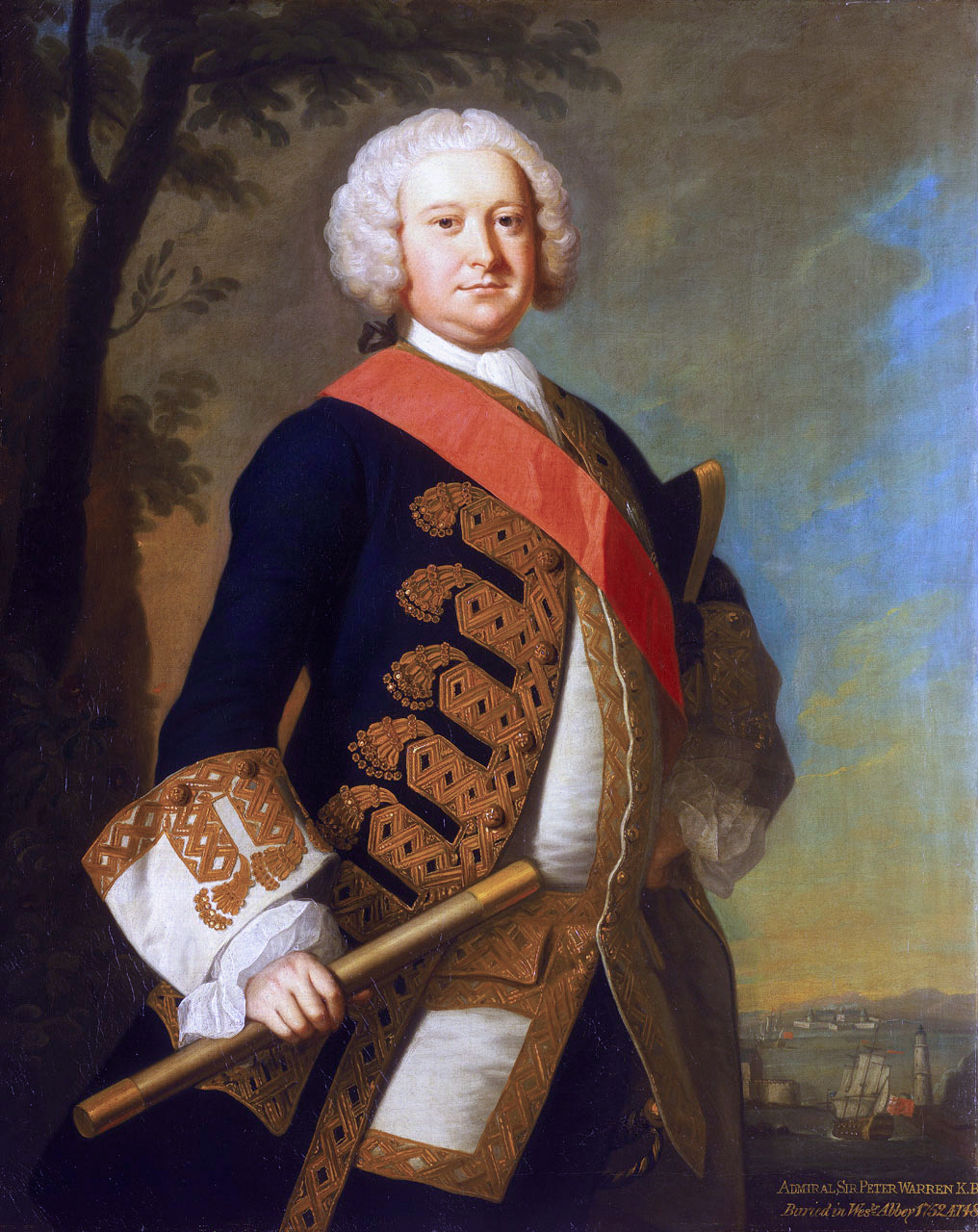
Commodore Peter Warren

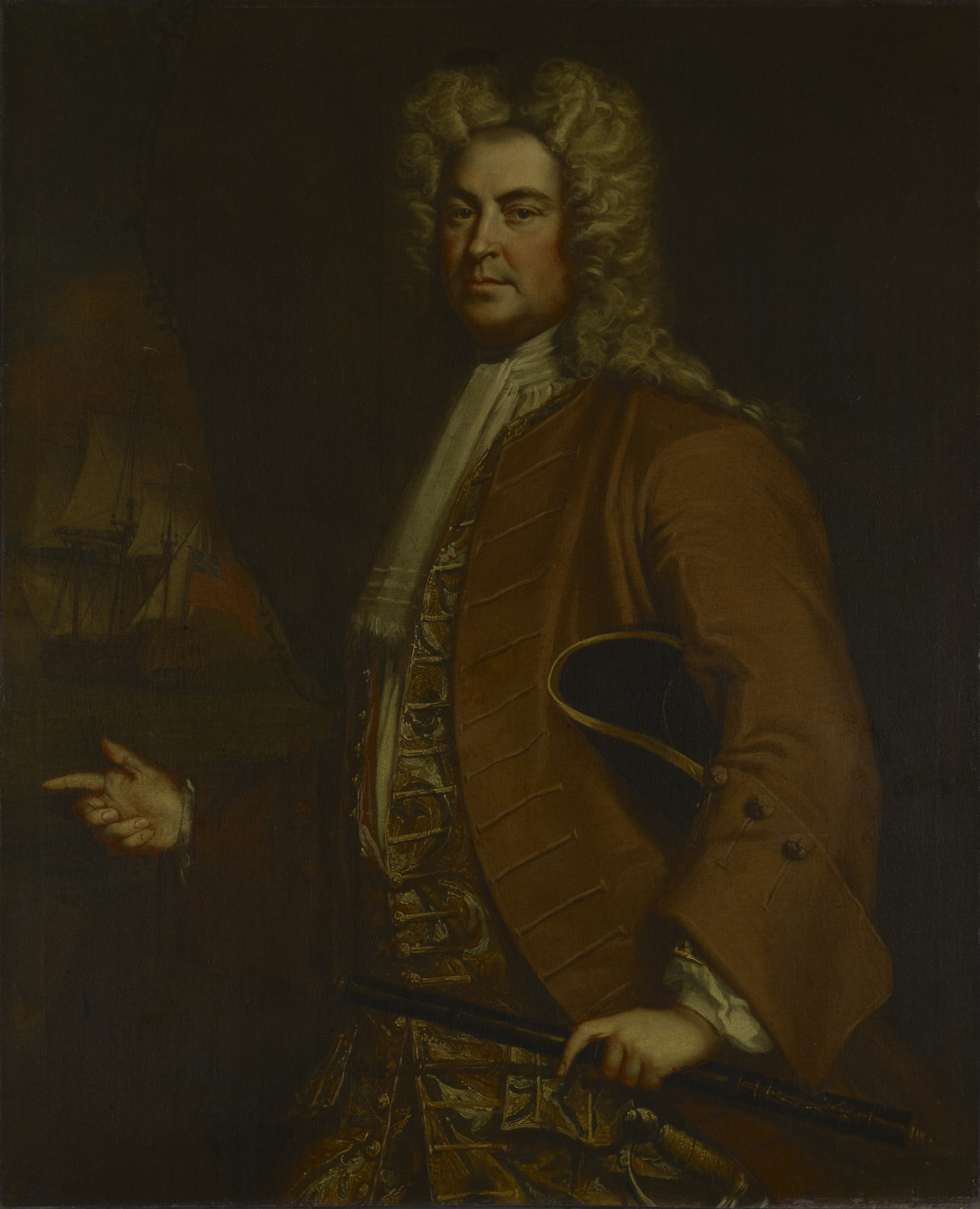
Edward Tyng, Prince of Orange (ship)

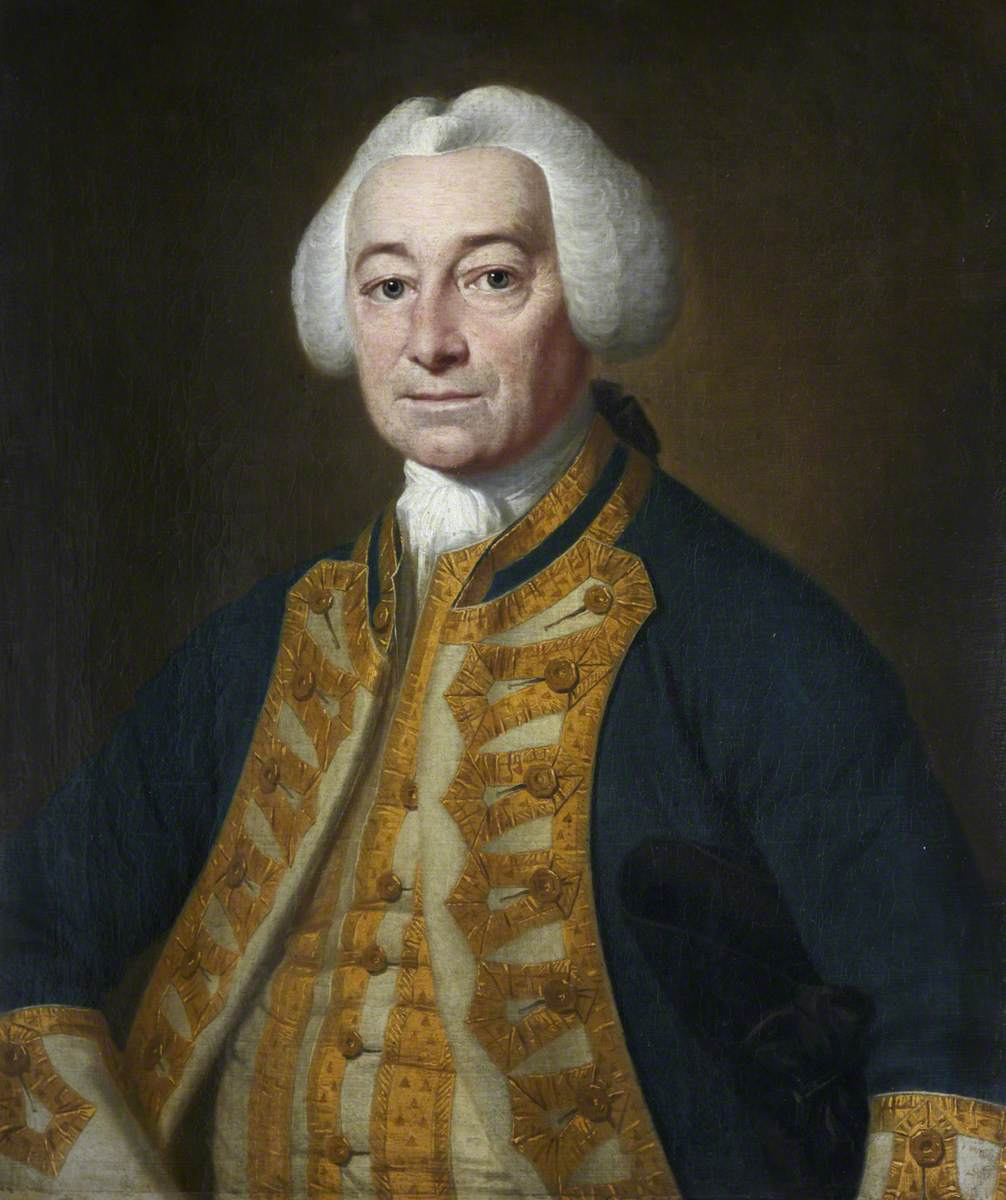
Captain Philip Durell,
- Commodore Peter Warren
- Captain Richard Tiddleman (T. Somers) (Superbe, 415 men, 60 guns)
- Captain Philip Durell (Eltham, 250 men, 40 guns)
- Captain W. J? Calmady (Launceston, 250 men, 40 guns)
- Captain James Douglas (then Capt. W. Montague) (Mermaid, 250 men, 40 guns)

Joined from England 22–23 May

- Captain Frederick Cornwall (Hector, 40 guns)
- Captain Richard Edwards (Princess Mary, 60 guns)

Joined from England 10–11 June

- Captain John Hore/ Hoar (D. Hare) (Canterbury, 60 guns);
- Captain J. Brett (Sunderland, 60 guns);
- Captain J. Crickshanke (Lark, 40 guns);
- Capt. F. Geary (Capt. Kemp) (Chester, 50 guns)
- Capt. James Douglas (Vigilant, 64 guns) – Former prize taken 18 May
- Captain Clark Gayton (Bien Aime, 30 guns) – former prize
- Captain Britt (Sunderland, 60 guns)

=== Massachusetts naval forces ===
- Captain Edward Tyng (Ship Massachusetts frigate, 150 men, 20 guns)
- Captain Jonathan Snelling (Molineux frigate, 150 men, 20 guns)
- Captain George Griffith (Caesar, 70 men, 14 guns)
- Captain John Rouse (Shirley Galley, 150 men, 20 guns)
- Captain Joseph Smithers/ Smythurst (Snow Prince of Orange (ship), 80 men, 14 guns – sank in storm)
- Captain William Fletcher (Brig Boston Packet, 16 guns; Wattering)
- Captain David Donahew † (Sloop, 12 guns)
- Captain Thomas Saunders (sloop, 8 guns)
- Captain Bosch (sloop, 8 guns)

=== Other naval forces ===
- Captain Griffin (Rhode Island sloop, 20 guns)
- Captain Thompson (Connecticut vessel, 16 guns)
- Captain John Prentice (Defence, Connecticut vessel, 12 guns, 100 men)
- Captain John Furnell (Fernald), (Abigail, 14 or 10 guns) – New Hampshire sloop
- Captain Daniel Fones (Tartar (ship), 14 guns) – Rhode Island sloop

== Other British and New England military and naval personnel ==
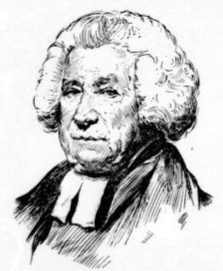
John Breynton

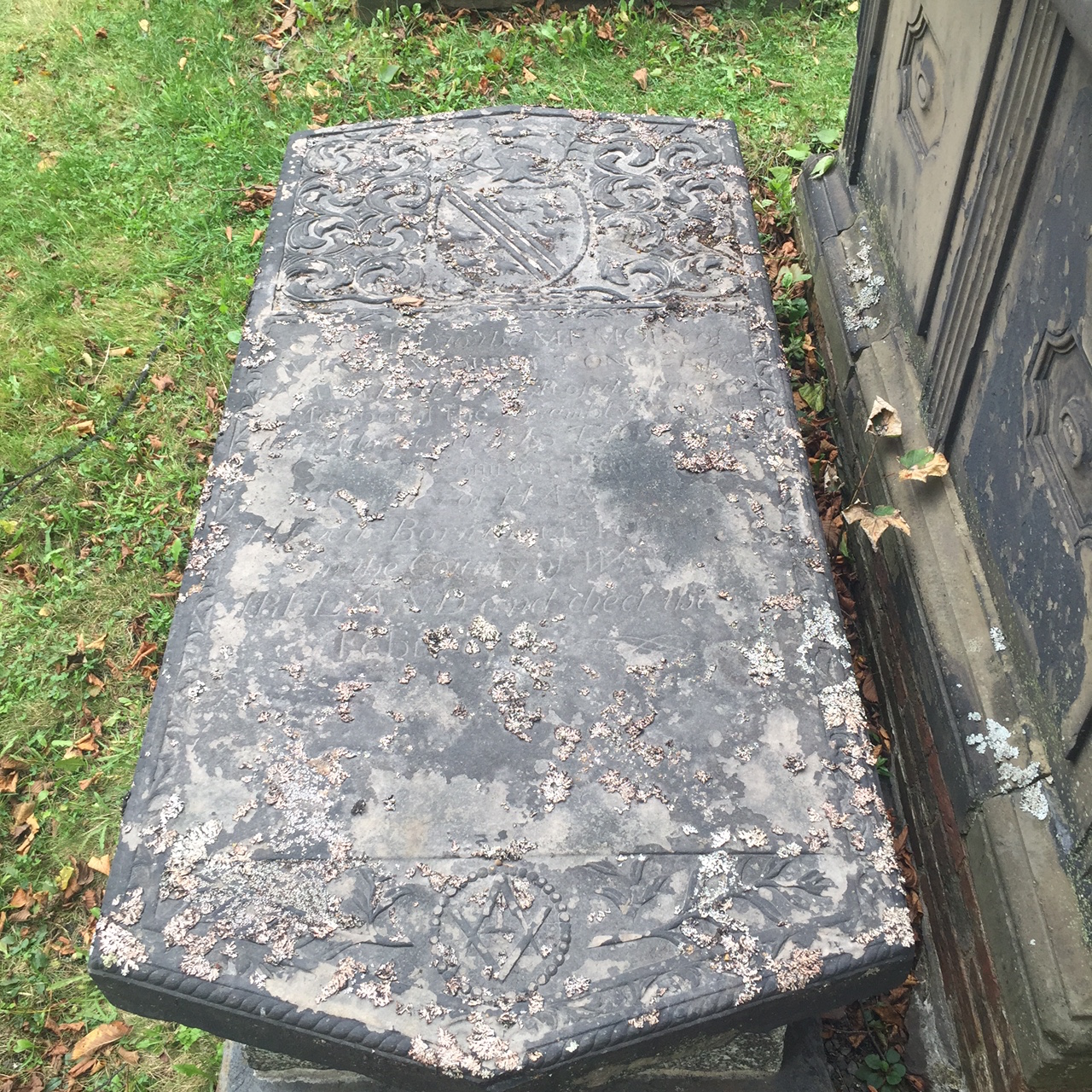
Winckworth Tonge, d. 1792, Old Burying Ground (Halifax, Nova Scotia)

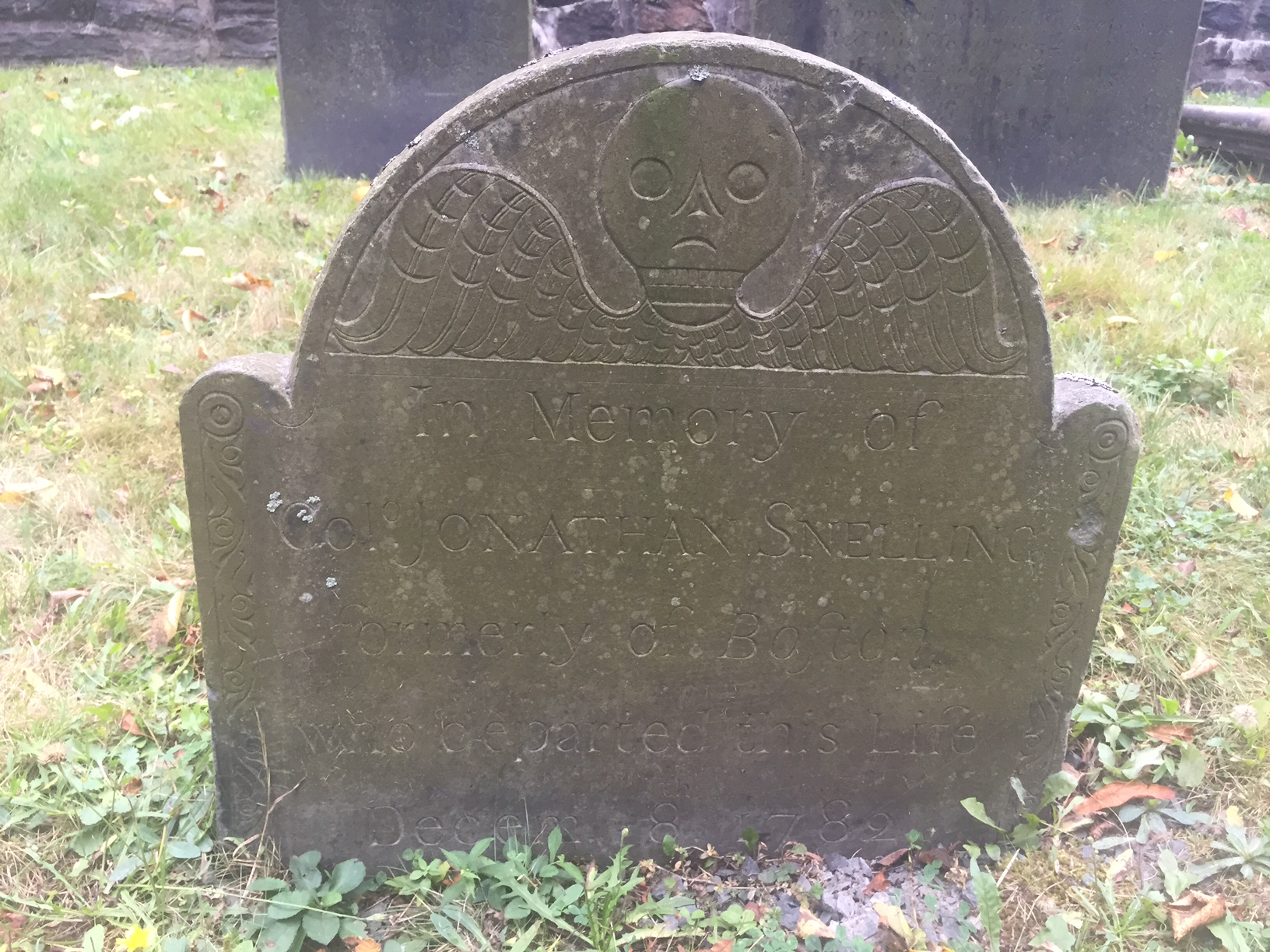
Colonel Jonathan Snelling's son, d. 1782,Old Burying Ground (Halifax, Nova Scotia)

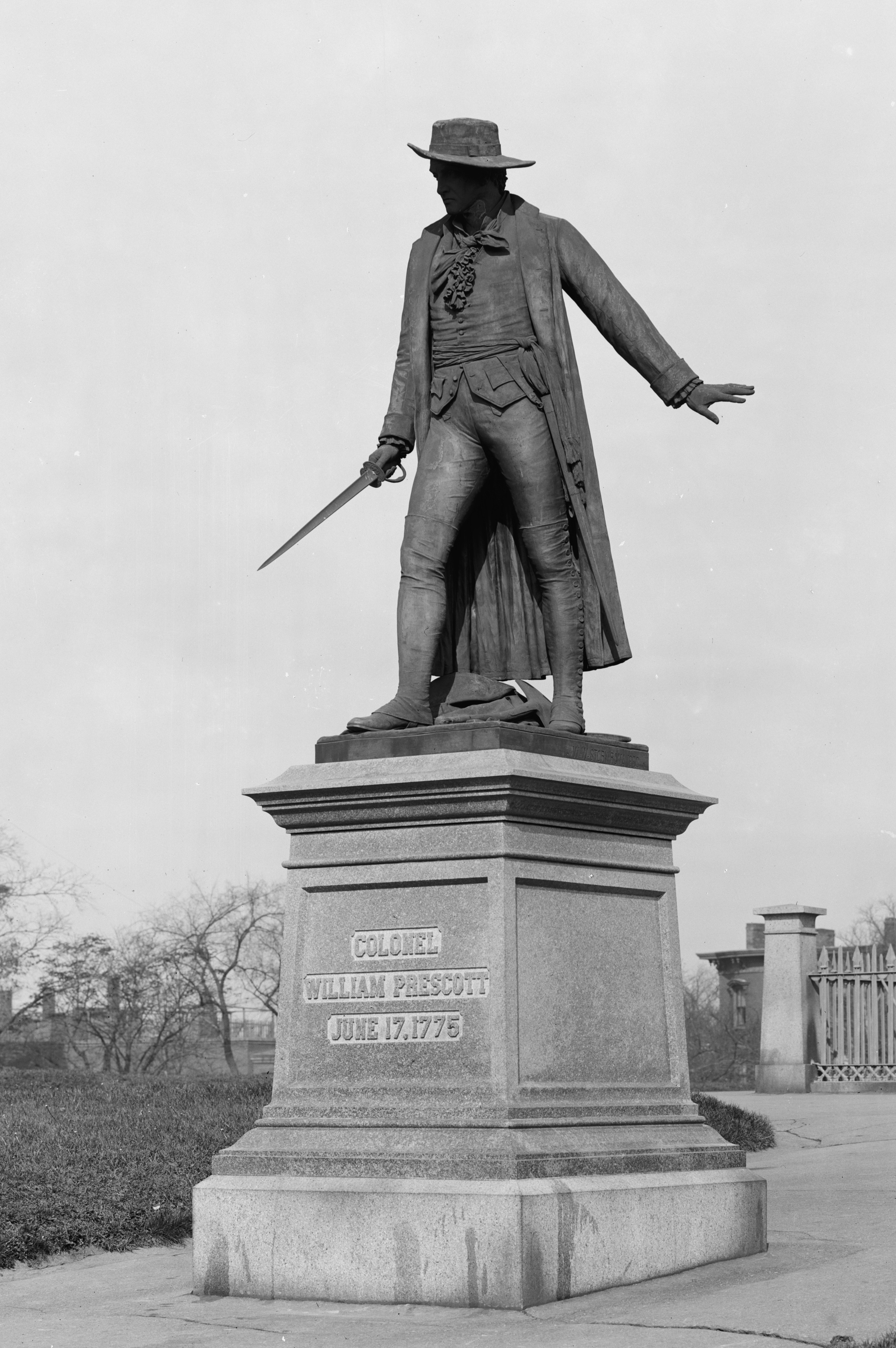
William Prescott
- Richard Jacques †, 2nd Massachusetts Regiment (Maine)
- James Gibson
- Samuel Whittemore, 3rd Massachusetts Regiment
- John Gorham
- John Henry Bastide
- Hector Theophilus de Cramahé
- Robert Denison, Connecticut Regiment
- Sir Charles Douglas, 1st Baronet
- Bartholomew Green
- Richard Gridley (engineer of the batteries)
- Robert Hale, 1st Massachusetts Regiment (Maine)
- Abijah Willard, 4th Massachusetts Regiment
- Robert Prescott
- Samuel Moody
- James Monk, 1st Massachusetts Regiment (Maine)
- Beamsley Perkins Glasier, 5th Massachusetts Regiment
- John Caleff
- William Vaughan
- Christopher Aldridge
- Nathan Whiting
- James Frye

== Legacy ==
- Louisburg Square in Boston is named after the siege.
- Vernon Street, Halifax, Nova Scotia was formerly known as Louisbourg Street.
- Shirley Street, Halifax, Nova Scotia is named for Massachusetts Governor William Shirley.
- Pepperell St. Halifax, Nova Scotia was named after Pepperrell
- Pepperell, Massachusetts was named after William Pepperrell.
- Warren, Rhode Island and Warren, New Hampshire are named after British naval hero Admiral Sir Peter Warren.

== See also ==
- Swiss regiment de Karrer
- Military history of Nova Scotia
- Louisbourg Garrison
- Provincial troops in the French and Indian Wars

== Bibliography ==
=== Primary sources ===
- Bidwell, Adonijah (April 1873). "Expeditions to Cape Breton: Journal of the Rev. Adonijah Bidwell, Chaplain of the Fleet". The New England Historical and Genealogical Register and Antiquarian Journal. 27 (2). Boston: New England Historic Genealogical Society: 153–160. – Also: Expeditions to Cape Breton at the Internet Archive
- Bradstreet, Dudley (1897). Diary kept by Lieut. Dudley Bradstreet of Groton, Mass., during the siege of Louisburg. April, 1745–January, 1746. Cambridge, Massachusetts: J. Wilson and son.
- Bradstreet, Dudley (1901). "Diary kept by Lieut. Dudley Bradstreet of Groton, Mass., during the siege of Louisburg. April, 1745–January, 1746". In Samuel Abbott Green (ed.). Three Military Diaries Kept by Groton Soldiers in Different Wars. Groton, Massachusetts: J. Wilson and son. pp. 1–39.
- Cleaves, Benjanmin (April 1912). "Benjamin Cleaves's Journal of the Expedition to Louisburg, 1745". The New England Historical and Genealogical Register. 66. Boston: 113–124.
- Curwen, Samuel (1842). George Atkinson Ward (ed.). Journal and letters of the late Samuel Curwen, judge of Admiralty, etc., an American refugee in England from 1775–1784. New York: C. S. Francis and Co.
- DeForest, Louis Effingham (1932). Louisbourg Journals, 1745. Society of colonial wars in the state of New York. Publicationno. 44. New York: Society of Colonial Wars. – Also: Louisbourg Journals, 1745 at Google Books ISBN 978-0-7884-1015-4
- Emerson, Joseph (October 1910). "Diary Kept at the Siege of Louisburg, March 15–August 14, 1745". Proceedings of the Massachusetts Historical Society. – Also: Diary Kept at the Siege of Louisburg, p. 65, at Google Books
- Gibson, James (1745). A Journal of the Late Siege by the Troops from North America, against the French at Cape Breton, the City of Louisbourg, and the Territories thereunto belonging. CIHM/ICMH Microfiche series = CIHM/ICMH collection de microfiches; no. 35919. London: J. Newbery. ISBN 9780665359194. – Also: A Journal of the Late Siege by the Troops from North America at Google Books
- Giddings, Daniel (October 1912). "Journal kept by Lieut. Daniel Giddings of Ipswitch during the Expedition Against Cape Breton in 1744–5". Historical Collections of the Essex Institute. 48 (4). Salem, Massachusetts: 293–304.
- Grenier, John (2008). The Far Reaches of Empire: War in Nova Scotia, 1710–1760. University of Oklahoma Press. ISBN 978-0-8061-8566-8.
- Lincoln, Charles Henry, ed. (1911). "The Journal of Sir William Pepperrell kept during the Expedition Against Louisbourg, Mar. 24 – Aug. 22, 1745". Proceedings of the American Antiquarian Society. New Series. Vol. XX. Worcester, Massachusetts: Worcester, Mass., American Antiquarian Society. pp. 133–183.
- Pepperrell, William (1746). An accurate journal and account of the proceedings of the New-England land-forces, during the late expedition against the French settlements on Cape Breton, to the time of the surrender of Louisbourg. A. and S. Brice. ISBN 9780665472428.
- Pepperrell, William (1899). "The Pepperrell Papers". Collections of the Massachusetts Historical Society. Sixth series. Vol. X. Boston. pp. 3–565.
- Pomeroy, Seth (1898). "Seth Pomeroy's journal". In James Russell Trumbull (ed.). History of Northampton, Massachusetts, from its settlement in 1654. Northampton, Massachusetts: Press of Gazette Printing Co. pp. 121–146.
- Shirley, William (1758). Memoirs of the Principal Transactions of the Last War between the English and French in North America. London: Green and Russell. – Also: Memoirs of the principal transactions at the Internet Archive
- Storer, John (1871). "Journal of Col. John Storer of Wells". In Benjamin Cutter; William Richard Cutter (eds.). A History of the Cutter family of New England. Boston: D. Clapp & Son. p. 310.
- Stearns, Benjamin (1909). Diary kept at the siege of Louisburg, March 11–August 2, 1745. Cambridge, Massachusetts: John Wilson and son.
- Upham, W.P. (October 1864). "Craft's Journal of the Siege of Louisburg". Historical Collections of the Essex Institute. 6 (5).
- Warren, Sir Peter; Gwyn, Julian, eds. (1973). The Royal Navy and North America: the Warren papers, 1736–1752. Navy Records Society. ISBN 9780853540717.
- Wolcott, Roger (1860). "Journal of Roger Wolcott at the Siege of Louisbourg, 1745" (PDF). Collections. Vol. I. Hartford: Connecticut Historical Society. pp. 131–160. – Also: Journal of Roger Wolcott at the Siege of Louisbourg, 1745 at the Internet Archive
- Wrong, George M., ed. (1897). Louisbourg in 1745: The Anonymous, Lettre D'un Habitant de Louisbourg (Cape Breton) Containing a narrative of an eye-witness of the siege in 1745. University of Toronto. – Also: Louisbourg in 1745 at Google Books – Only account from the French viewpoint except the official reports
- "Letters Relating to the Expedition Against Cape Breton". Collections of the Massachusetts Historical Society for the Year 1792. 1st Series. Vol. I. 1806. pp. 5–60.

=== Secondary sources ===
- Drake. The Taking of Louisbourg, 1745. 1891.
- Anderson, M.S. (1995). The War of Austrian Succession 1740–1748. Routledge. ISBN 978-1-317-89921-1.
- Baker, Raymond F. (1995). A Campaign of Amateurs: The Siege of Louisbourg, 1745 (PDF). Canadian Historic Sites: Occasional Papers in Archaeology and History No. 18. Parks Canada. ISBN 978-0-6601-6065-8.
- Balcom, B.A. "Defending Unama'ki: Mi'kmaw Resistance in Cape Breton, 1745"
- Balcom. A.A. "The Mi'kmaq and the First Siege of Louisbourg, 1745," Paper presented at the 2003 Spring Heritage Conference, Amherst, Nova Scotia
- Burrage, Henry S. (1910). Maine at Louisburg in 1745. Augusta, Maine: Burleigh & Flynt. – Also Maine at Louisburg in 1745 at Google Books
- Chapin, Howard Millar (January 1923). "New England Vessels in the Expedition Against Louisbourg, 1745". New England Historical and Genealogical Register. 77. Boston: 59–71.
- Chapin, Howard Millar (1928). Privateering in King George's war, 1739–1748. Providence: E.A. Johnson.
- Davis, Paul K. (2003). Besieged: 100 Great Sieges from Jericho to Sarajevo. Oxford University Press. p. 154. ISBN 978-0-19-521930-2.
- Downey, Fairfax (1965). Louisbourg: Key to a Continent. Englewood Cliffs, New Jersey: Prentice-Hall.
- Drake, Samuel Adams (1890). The Taking of Louisburg, 1745. Boston: Lee & Shepard. – Also: The Taking of Louisburg, 1745 at Project Gutenberg
- Gilmore, George C. (1896). Roll of New Hampshire Men at Louisburg, Cape Breton, 1745. Concord, New Hampshire: Edward N. Pearson.
- McLennan, John Stewart (1918). Louisbourg, from Its Foundation to Its Fall, 1713–1758. London: Macmillan and Co. – Also: Louisbourg: From its Foundation to its Fall, 1713–1758 at the Internet Archive
- Moore, Christopher (26 July 2018). "Louisbourg". The Canadian Encyclopedia (online ed.). Historica Canada.
- Murdoch, Beamish (1866). A History of Nova-Scotia, Or Acadie. Vol. II. Halifax: J. Barnes.
- Parkman, Francis (March 1891). "Capture of Louisbourg by the New England Militia, Part I". The Atlantic Monthly. Vol. LXVII. Houghton, Mifflin and Company. pp. 314–324. – Also: The Atlantic Monthly at Google Books
- Parkman, Francis (April 1891). "Capture of Louisbourg by the New England Militia, Part II". The Atlantic Monthly. Vol. LXVII. Houghton, Mifflin and Company. pp. 514–523.
- Parkman, Francis (May 1891). "Capture of Louisbourg by the New England Militia, Part III". The Atlantic Monthly. Vol. LXVII. Houghton, Mifflin and Company. pp. 621–630.
- Parkman, Francis (1897). A Half-Century of Conflict. France and England in North America, Part 6. Vol. II. Boston: Little Brown and Company. – Also: A Half-Century of Conflict at Project Gutenberg
- Patterson, Frank H. (1917). A History of Tatamagouche, Nova Scotia. Royal Print & Litho. p. 17.
- Rawlyk, George A. (1999). Yankees at Louisbourg: The Story of the First Siege, 1745. Breton Books. ISBN 978-1-895415-45-2.
- Sabine, Lorenzo (1847). The American Loyalists: Or, Biographical Sketches of Adherents to the British Crown in the War of the Revolution; Alphabetically Arranged; with a Preliminary Historical Essay. Charles C. Little and James Brown.
- Sabine, Lorenzo (1864). Biographical Sketches of Loyalists of the American Revolution. Vol. II. Boston: Little, Brown and Company. ISBN 978-1-4290-1953-8.
- Sosin, Jack M. (October 1957). "Louisbourg and the Peace of Aix-la-Chapelle, 1748". William and Mary Quarterly. 3rd Series. 14 (4): 516–535. doi:10.2307/1918519. JSTOR 1918519.
