= Abijah Willard =

Abijah Willard (27 July 1724 at Lancaster, Massachusetts – 28 May 1789 in Saint John, New Brunswick) was a soldier during the French and Indian War who wrote a journal during the Expulsion of the Acadians. During King George's War, he fought in the Siege of Louisbourg (1745). During the French and Indian War, he fought in the Battle of Fort Beauséjour.

On the eve the American Revolution, Willard was imprisoned in Connecticut. He went with the Loyalists in Boston and left for Halifax, Nova Scotia. He returned to New York but was again evacuated to Nova Scotia, this time in present-day New Brunswick.

He died in Saint John, New Brunswick. He married 2 Dec. 1747 Elizabeth Prescott of Groton, secondly in 1752 Anna Prentice of Lancaster, and thirdly in 1772 Mary, widow of John McKown of Boston. Elizabeth Prescott Willard was a sister of Col. William Prescott, commander at Breed's Hill in Charlestown, Massachusetts.
