= Robert Hale (doctor) =

American physician

Robert Hale (12 February 1702 (o.s.) – 20 March 1767) was a medical doctor and military officer from Beverly, Massachusetts.

== Biography ==
Hale graduated from Harvard in 1721 and later practiced as a physician in Beverly. He commanded a regiment under William Pepperrell at the Siege of Louisbourg in 1745. In 1747, he was appointed by the legislature of Massachusetts a commissioner to New York to adopt measures for the general defence, and in 1755 was a commissioner to New Hampshire to plan an expedition against the French. He was appointed sheriff of Essex County, Massachusetts, in 1761, and was for 13 years a member of the legislature.
