= Galeffi =

Galeffi is an Italian surname, possibly derived from caleffare 'to make fun' or calafatare 'to caulk'. Notable people with the name include:

- Carlo Galeffi (1884–1961), Italian operatic baritone
- Ernesto Galeffi (1917–1986), Italian sculptor
- Pietro Francesco Galeffi (1770–1837), Italian Roman Catholic cardinal
- Romano Galeffi (1915–1988), Italian philosopher and art critic

== See also ==
- Caleffi
