= Calef =

Calef is a surname. Notable people with the surname include:

- John Haskell Calef (1841–1912), American artillery officer
- Nancy Calef, American figurative painter, illustrator and author
- Robert Calef (baptized 1648–1719), English cloth merchant in colonial America

== See also ==
- Dr. John Calef House
