= Sonya Caleffi =

Italian serial killer (born 1970)

- Born: 21 July 1970 (age 56); Como, Italy
- Penalty: 20 years

Details
- Victims: 5+
- Span of crimes: 2003–2004
- Country: Italy
- Date apprehended: 15 December 2004

Sonya Caleffi (born 21 July 1970) is an Italian serial killer. She was suspected of killing 15 to 18 people and convicted of five of them.

== Biography ==
At fifteen, Caleffi began to suffer from depression and anorexia nervosa, but at school, she remained a very quiet girl, with good performance in school.

Between 1990 and 1993, she attended courses to become a professional nurse at the Valduce Hospital of Como. In 1993, she married a carpenter from Cernobbio after being engaged for six months. Continuous quarrels between them lead her to divorce after just a year. She later met a radiologist and went to live with him in Tavernerio, where she finished her job in a state of reclusion at home.

From 1993 to 2000, Caleffi worked at the Valduce Hospital of Como in the departments of surgery general, endoscopy and first aid. From 2000 to 2001 she worked in first aid at Ospedale Sant'Anna of Como. In October 2001, she returned for a month to Valduce Hospital of Como. From 2 to 13 November, she worked at the rest home and clinic Le Betulle of Appiano Gentile. In 2002, she worked in two different periods at the nursing home of Albese con Cassano, and in the department of psychiatry. On 4 August 2002, Caleffi tried to commit suicide with her car by driving into a wall at Salita Cappuccini in Como. She attempted suicide three more times between 2002 and 2004. Between September and November 2003, she worked in the general medicine department of Sant'Anna Hospital, where 8 terminally ill patients were killed due to injection of air, resulting in embolism. From September to 8 November 2004, she worked at Manzoni Hospital of Lecco, where she allegedly killed 18 people. This was discovered by the medical director of the garrison, who informed the Public Prosecutor's Office.

== Arrest ==
«I am very sorry for what happened, and I ask forgiveness if it is possible. I didn't want those patients to end up like this. I performed those procedures because I liked that everyone rushed to save the patients in time.»

On 15 December 2004, Caleffi was arrested but confessed to only six murders, four confirmed and two suspected. Police during her house search found books about bulimia, anorexia nervosa, death and her most read novels are Invisible Women by Fabiola De Clercq, Sprecata by Marya Hornbacher, Death is a friend by Marie de Hennezel, and above all Veronika Decides To Die by Paulo Coelho. The hospital administration of Lecco in the meantime opens the investigations. On 17 December 2004, she left the Bassone prison of Como and the power of attorney ascertained only one case of death. On 18 December 2004, she was transferred to the seventh floor of Sant'Anna Hospital of Como in the detained ward. On 11 February 2005, she was transferred to the Opg of Castiglione delle Stiviere (MN), and on 10 March, she withdrew the confession she made in December and three months later she said she remembered not killing anyone. From 2006, she worked as a telephonist at San Vittore Prison.

== Sentencing ==
On 14 December 2007, Caleffi was sentenced to serve 20 years of imprisonment for five murders and two attempted murders in San Vittore Prison causing anger among the families of the victims. On 3 March 2008, the Appeal Court of Milan confirmed the first instance sentence of 20 years imprisonment, even if the attorney general had requested life imprisonment, but the abbreviated rite has reduced the sentence.

== See also ==
- List of serial killers by country
- List of serial killers by number of victims
