= John Caleff =

United Empire Loyalist

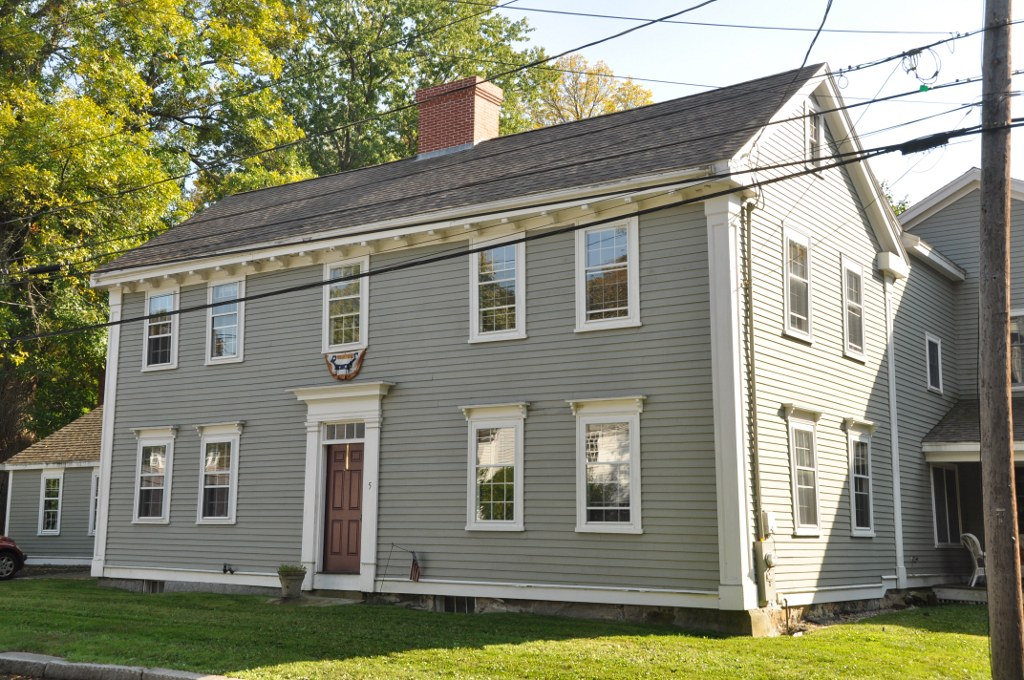
The Dr. John Calef House circa 2012.

John Caleff (30 August 1726 – 23 October 1812) was a surgeon, member of Massachusetts House of Representatives, and later United Empire Loyalist. In 1745, he was captured as part of the Siege of Louisbourg.

He was a founder of the New Ireland crown colony.

In 1774, a mob formed which demanded that Caleff issue a formal confession for his loyalist actions.

His former home, known now as the Dr. John Calef House, is located in Ipswich, Massachusetts. He moved to Saint Andrews, New Brunswick in 1791 and died there in 1812.

His daughter, Mehetabel, was married to David Mowat.
