= Dr. John Calef House =

Historic house in Massachusetts, United States

- U.S. National Register of Historic Places
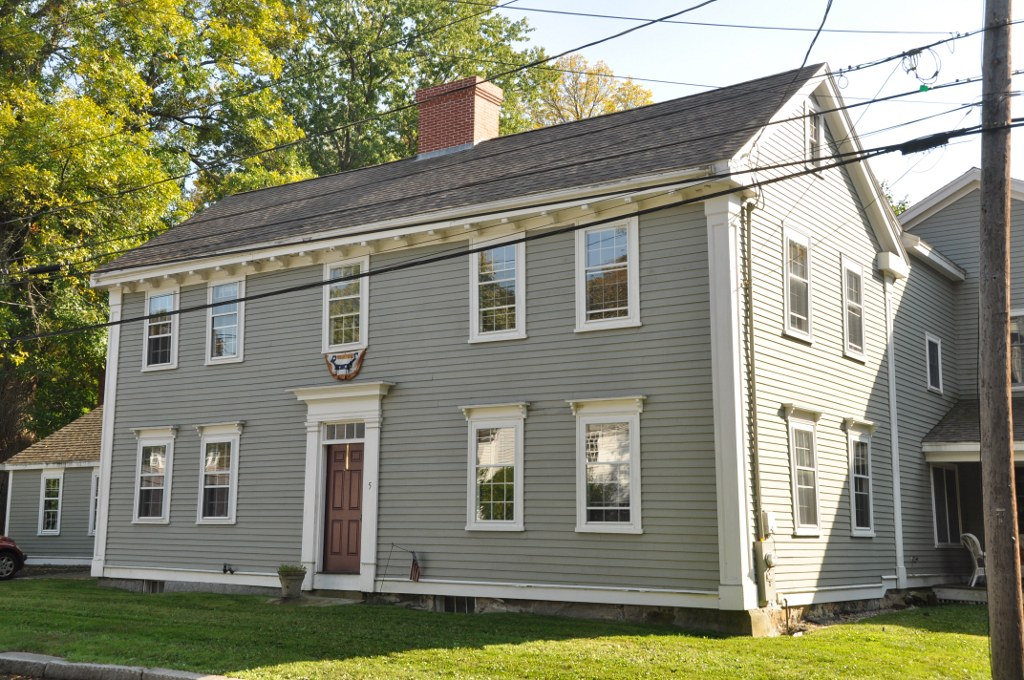

- Location within Massachusetts Location within the United States
- Location: Ipswich, Massachusetts
- Coordinates: 42°40′33″N 70°50′5″W
- Built: c.1671
- Architectural style: Colonial
- MPS: Central Village, Ipswich, Massachusetts MRA
- NRHP reference No.: 80000447
- Added to NRHP: September 17, 1980

The Dr. John Calef House is a historic house at 7 Poplar Street in Ipswich, Massachusetts. It is a well-preserved example of a First Period house with high-quality Georgian modifications. The core of the house was built c. 1671 by Deacon Thomas Knowlton, who purchased the land on which it originally stood on South Main Street in that year. It was subsequently altered in the middle of the 18th century, acquiring its present Georgian styling. In the 1770s the house was owned by noted Loyalist John Caleff. It was acquired in 1777 by John Heard, who moved the house to its present location in order to build a more elaborate Federalist house on the site.

The house was listed on the National Register of Historic Places in 1980.

== See also ==
- National Register of Historic Places listings in Ipswich, Massachusetts
- National Register of Historic Places listings in Essex County, Massachusetts
