= James Gibson (seaman) =

British ship captain and merchant

James Gibson (1706 – 1752) was a merchant in the British colonies of Jamaica and the Province of Massachusetts Bay. During King George's War (1744–1748), William Shirley, the Governor of Massachusetts, debated whether to siege and capture the French fortress of Louisburg on Cape Breton Island, Nova Scotia. According to Gibson's journal, he convinced Governor Shirley that the siege would be successful and used his personal wealth to provide 300 soldiers for the campaign. Gibson wrote an account of the Siege of Louisburg, and it was published in London in late 1745.

== Early life ==
James was born on 1 April 1706, in Boston, Massachusetts to James and Mary (Peck) Gibson. His father was a mariner and purchased a tavern called "Marlborough Arms" in 1711, located at the corner of Kilby and State streets adjacent to Bunch-of-Grapes. His mother Mary was licensed to sell strong drink in the tavern on 30 June 1712. In 1722, Mary deeded the tavern to her three children: Mary, James, and John. According to his journal, he served in the Royal Regiment of Foot Guards in the British Army, and was ordered to the island of Barbados. While serving in Barbados, he met a widow named Thomazin (Duesbury) Barton, the daughter of James and Rebecca Duesbury. James and Thomazin were married in the parish of Saint Michael, Barbados on 24 October 1730. The Gibsons moved to Boston prior to 1735, and their only child, Mary Duesbury Gibson, was born there on 27 December 1737.

== Merchant and Ship Captain ==
According to his great-grandson, Lorenzo Dow Johnson (1805–1867), Gibson was a prosperous merchant who owned a plantation on the island of Jamaica, owned a mansion in the neighborhood of Beacon Hill, Boston, was a ship captain, was a shareholder in Long Wharf, and owned land in what is now Maine, both near the village of Stroudwater, now a neighborhood of Portland, Maine and beyond the Kennebec River. Boston land records record several purchases that he made between 1722 and 1745 including the Marlborough Arms tavern and the land in the west side of Beacon Hill, and refer to him as "Gentleman" and "Esquire". His father-in-law did own a plantation in Barbados, but Thomazin did not inherit it when her father died in 1717. There was a lucrative triangular trade between New England, the West Indies and Africa, and Boston's Long Wharf was known to be the busiest port in Colonial America. In 1722, his mother deeded one-third of the Marlborough Arms tavern to him, which was located just a few blocks from Long Wharf on State Street. In 1735, younger brother John deeded his interest in the tavern to James, provided that their mother Mary receive rent for six years. James sold the Marlborough Arms to Roger Passmore in 1741. Several of his descendants who published biographies on him were active Methodists and chose not to speculate whether Gibson's trading included either slaves or rum. The inventory of his estate did not list any slaves.

== Siege of Louisburg ==
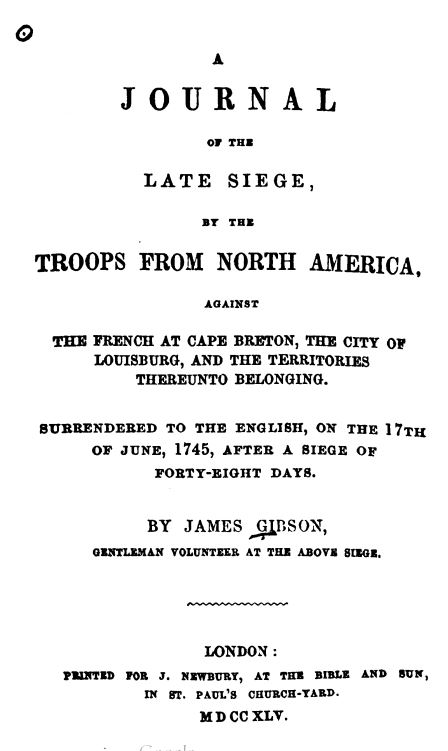
High-resolution scan of the original 1745 London printinJames Gibson's journal. Provided by Richard J. Wilcox, author of Searching for James Gibson.

France and Great Britain declared war in 1744 in what was known as King George's War in the American Colonies. The colonies in New France, in what is now Canada were protected by the Fortress of Louisburg. The Fortress also served as a base of attack against British colonial interests, especially Gibson's shipping interests in the Atlantic and his property in Maine. With the British and French fleets engaged with one another in the Caribbean, William Shirley, the Governor of Massachusetts, had proposed that the Colony raise its own militia and fleet and take Louisburg by surprise. Gibson notes that when Shirley first presented his proposal to the General Court in Boston, it was rejected. However, the Governor knew Gibson "to be a man of weighty character, as well as weighty purse" and visited him in his "counting room, and abruptly said, 'Gibson, do you feel like giving up the expedition to Louisburg?'" Gibson offered his signature to a new petition, along with the promise to hire and lead three hundred soldiers and provide transport with his own expense. This new petition was approved.

The siege lasted for forty-eight days, and Gibson provides a detailed account of the battle in his journal, which was presented to the King, George II of Great Britain, and published in London's Gentleman's Magazine under the title A Journal of the Late Siege by the Troops from North America against the French at Cape Breton, the City of Louisburg and the Territories Thereunto Belonging: Surrendered to the English on 17 June 1745 After a Siege of Forty-Eight Days. The American colonists were successful in capturing the fortress, although it would be given back to France as part of the treaty negotiations to end the war. On 1 April 1746, the Parliament of Great Britain resolved to reimburse the American Colonies of Massachusetts Bay, New Hampshire, Connecticut and Rhode Island for their expenses incurred in the siege, as well as to reimburse Gibson personally, the only individual named in the resolution. The resolution was to reimburse James Gibson, Esquire, for 548 Pounds and 15 Shillings. However, when the ship arrived in Boston carrying the payment from the Crown, only the payment to the Colonial treasuries was on board, not Gibson's.

== Death ==
In the fall of 1752 Gibson was losing substantial income from the mismanagement of his Jamaica plantation, and so he left Boston and sailed to Jamaica to confront the overseer. On the day that he was scheduled to depart, his overseer invited him to dinner and "promised a satisfactory adjustment". After dinner he set sail for Boston but after three hours died in great agony, and the crew suspected that he had been poisoned. His widow Thomazin died in Boston weeks after having been informed of his death, on 13 November 1752, leaving their fifteen-year-old daughter Mary an orphan.

== Lost Estate ==
With the sudden death of both parents, Mary Duesbury Gibson was left an orphan. The court assigned Samuel Butler as executor of the estate, but he was "corrupt and fraudulent" and the only part of her father's estate and landholdings that remained when she became an adult was the land in Maine. The Estate Papers filed by Samuel Butler valued James' estate at 140 pounds, with the Beacon Hill mansion being worth 100 pounds, and does not list any other property in Boston, in Jamaica, or in what is now Maine. It described the estate as insolvent, as debts were valued at more than 200 pounds. She married Caleb Hayden in 1756 at age 18, but he died soon after. Five years later, she married Nehemiah Blanchard, a descendant of John Alden. Following their marriage, the family's ongoing struggle to protect and claim the remnants of the inheritance culminated in the colonial court case Blanchard v. Denny, which explicitly documented the contested management and final dispersal of the remaining Gibson properties. In 1767, Nehemiah traveled to Maine to view the property she inherited from her father and drowned in the Kennebec River. About the same time, Parliament published a notice in Boston for the heirs of the James Gibson estate regarding the payment due. Mary contracted the services of an attorney to travel to London to collect the sum. He eloped and was never heard from again by Mary or her descendants. With her father's estate now lost to her, she gave up any further efforts to claim lost property.
