= Scalping =

Removing part of the human scalp

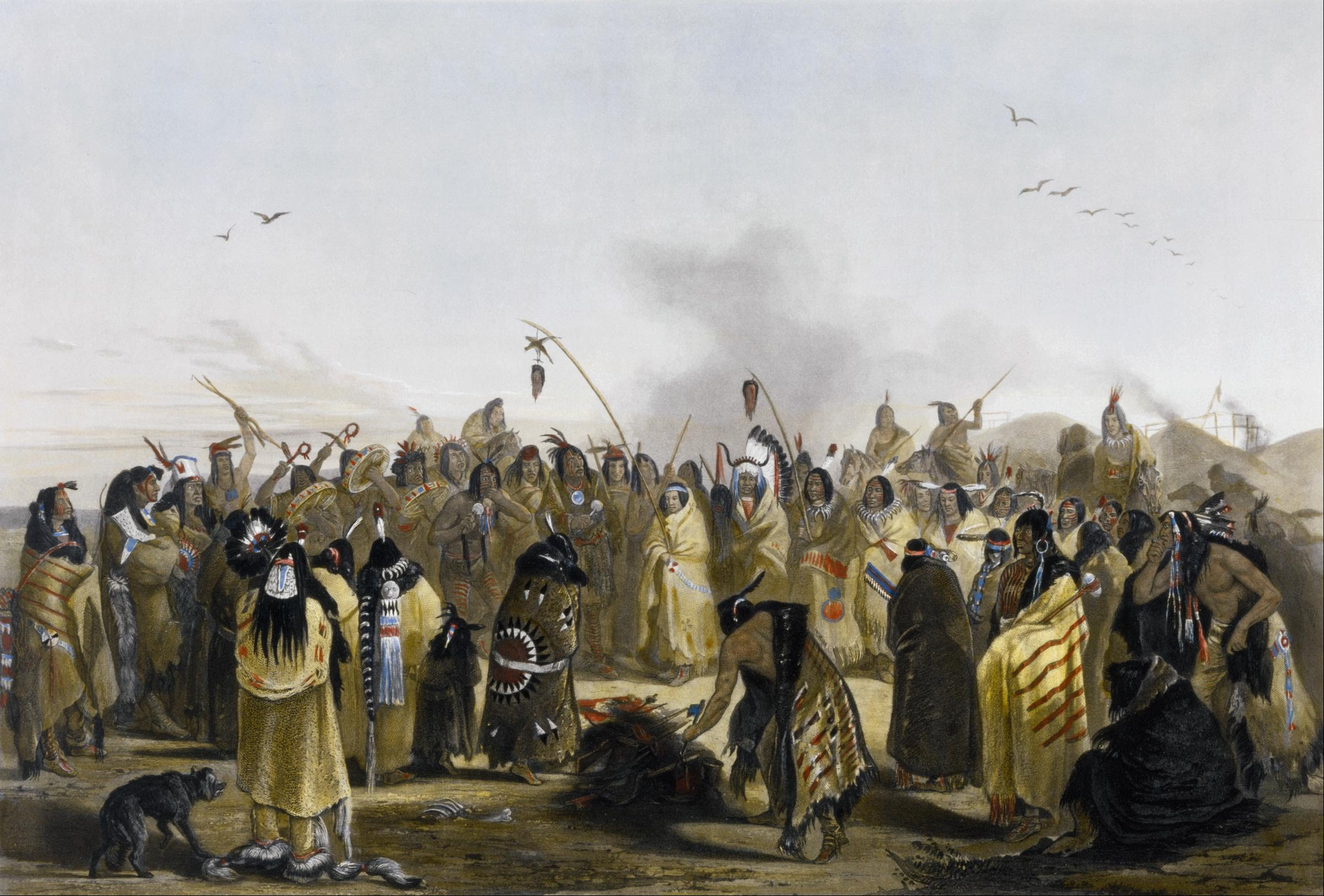
Karl Bodmer's 1844 aquatint Scalp Dance of the Minitarres depicts Siouan Hidatsa people in a scalp dance.

Scalping is the act of cutting or tearing a part of the human scalp, with hair attached, from the head, and generally occurred in warfare with the scalp being a trophy. Scalp-taking is considered part of the broader cultural practice of the taking and display of human body parts as trophies, and may have developed as an alternative to the taking of human heads, for scalps were easier to take, transport, and preserve for subsequent display. Scalping independently developed in various cultures in both the Old and New Worlds.

== Europe ==
One of the earliest examples of scalping dates back to the Mesolithic period, found at a hunter-gatherer cemetery in Sweden. Several human remains from the stone-age Ertebølle culture in Denmark show evidence of scalping. A man found in a grave in the Alvastra pile-dwelling in Sweden had been scalped approximately 5,000 years ago.

Georg Friederici noted that “Herodotus provided the only clear and satisfactory portrayal of a scalping people in the old world” in his description of the Scythians, a nomadic people then located to the north and west of the Black Sea. Herodotus related that Scythian warriors would behead the enemies they defeated in battle and present the heads to their king to claim their share of the plunder. Then, the warrior would skin the head “by making a circular cut round the ears and shaking out the skull; he then scrapes the flesh off the skin with the rib of an ox, and when it is clean works it with his fingers until it is supple, and fit to be used as a sort of handkerchief. He hangs these handkerchiefs on the bridle of his horse, and is very proud of them. The best man is the man who has the greatest number.”

Ammianus Marcellinus noted the taking of scalps by the Alani in terms quite similar to those used by Herodotus. The Abbé Emmanuel H. D. Domenech referred to the decalvare of the ancient Germans and the capillos et cutem detrahere of the code of the Visigoths as examples of scalping in early medieval Europe, though some more recent interpretations of these terms relate them to shaving off the hair of the head as a legal punishment rather than scalping.

In England in 1036, Earl Godwin, father of Harold Godwinson, was reportedly responsible for scalping his enemies, among whom was Alfred Aetheling. According to the ancient Anglo-Saxon Chronicle, 'some of them were blinded, some maimed, some scalped. No more horrible deed was done in this country since the Danes came and made peace here'.

In 1845, mercenary John Duncan observed what he estimated to be 700 scalps taken in warfare and displayed as trophies by a contingent of female soldiers—Dahomey Amazons—employed by the King of Dahomey (present-day Republic of Benin). Duncan noted that these would have been taken and kept over a long period of time and would not have come from a single battle. Although Duncan travelled widely in Dahomey, and described customs such as the taking of heads and the retention of skulls as trophies, nowhere else does he mention scalping.

Occasional instances of scalping of dead Axis troops by Allied military personnel are known from World War II. While many of these instances took place in the Pacific Theater, along with more extreme forms of trophy-hunting (see American mutilation of Japanese war dead), occasional instances are reported in the European Theater as well. One particularly widely reported, although disputed, case involves that of German general Friedrich Kussin, the commandant of the town of Arnhem who was ambushed and killed by British paratroopers in the early stages of Operation Market Garden.

== Asia ==
There is physical evidence that scalping was practiced during the Longshan and Erlitou periods in China's central plain.

A skull from an Iron Age cemetery in South Siberia shows evidence of scalping. It lends physical evidence to the practice of scalp taking by the Scythians living there.

Some evidence is also found in the Indian subcontinent. Bhai Taru Singh (c. 1720 – 1 July 1745) was a prominent Sikh martyr known for facing execution, in the name of protecting Sikh values, by having had his head scalped rather than cutting his hair and converting to Islam.

== Americas ==
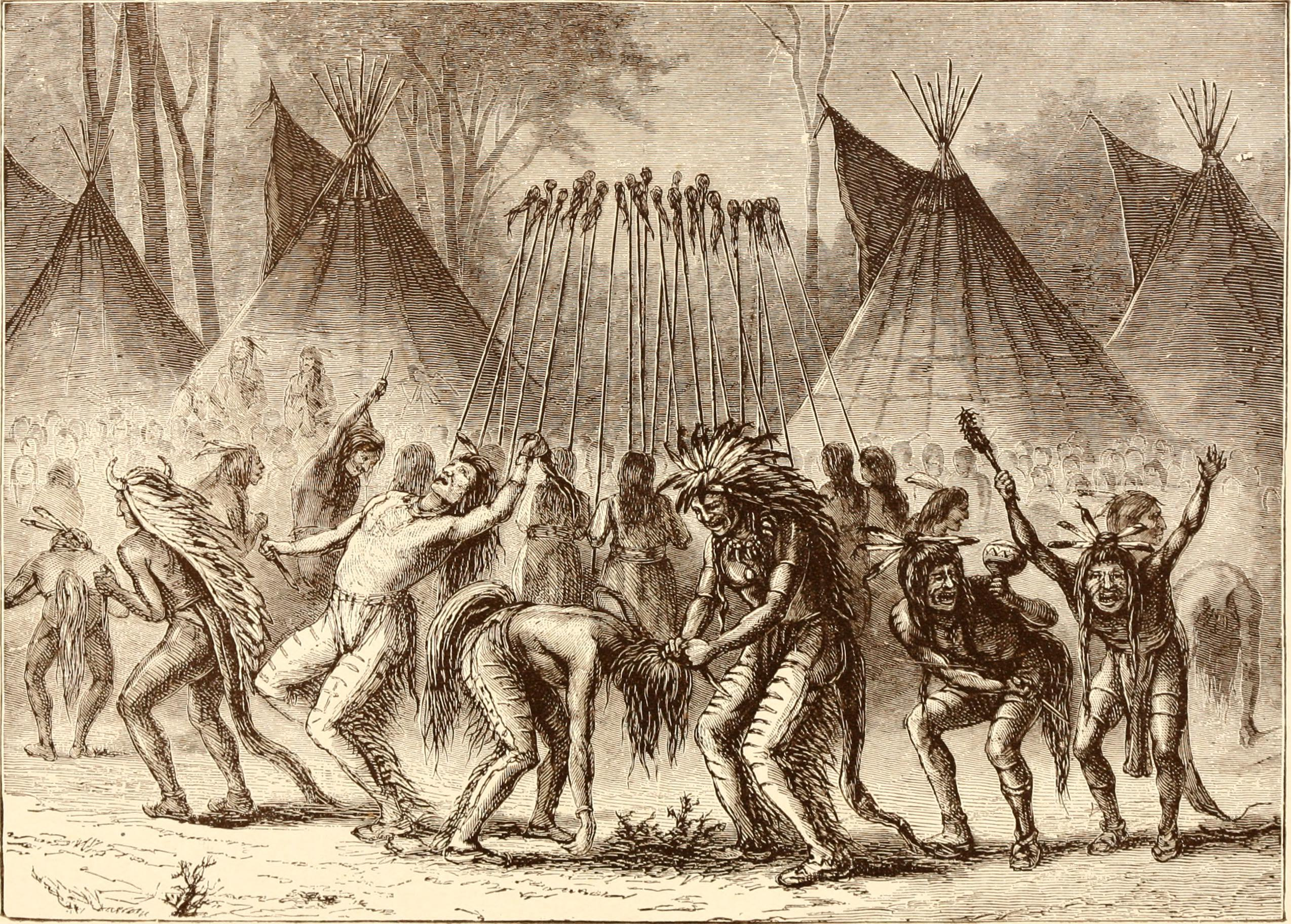
Illustration of a scalp dance from the 1919 edition of 1884 children's book Indian History for Young Folks by Francis S. Drake

Scalping in the Americas arose from the practices of Native American tribes.

=== Techniques ===
Specific scalping techniques varied somewhat from place to place, depending on the cultural patterns of the scalper regarding the desired shape, size, and intended use of the severed scalp, and on how the victims wore their hair, but the general process of scalping was quite uniform:

They seize the head of the disabled or dead enemy, and placing one of their feet on the neck, twist their left hand in the hair; by this means, having extended the skin that covers the top of the head, they draw out their scalping knives, which are always kept in good order for this cruel purpose, and with a few dextrous strokes take off the part that is termed the scalp. They are so expeditious in doing this, that the whole time required scarcely exceeds a minute.

The scalp separated from the skull along the plane of the areolar connective tissue, the fourth (and least substantial) of the five layers of the human scalp. Scalping was not in itself fatal, though it was most commonly inflicted on the gravely wounded or the dead. The earliest instruments used in scalping were stone knives crafted of flint, chert, or obsidian, or other materials like reeds or oyster shells that could be worked to carry an edge equal to the task. Collectively, such tools were also used for a variety of everyday tasks like skinning and processing game, but were replaced by metal knives acquired in trade through European contact. The implement, often referred to as a "scalping knife" in popular American and European literature, was not known as such by Native Americans, a knife being for them just a simple and effective multi-purpose utility tool for which scalping was but one of many uses.

=== Intertribal conflict ===
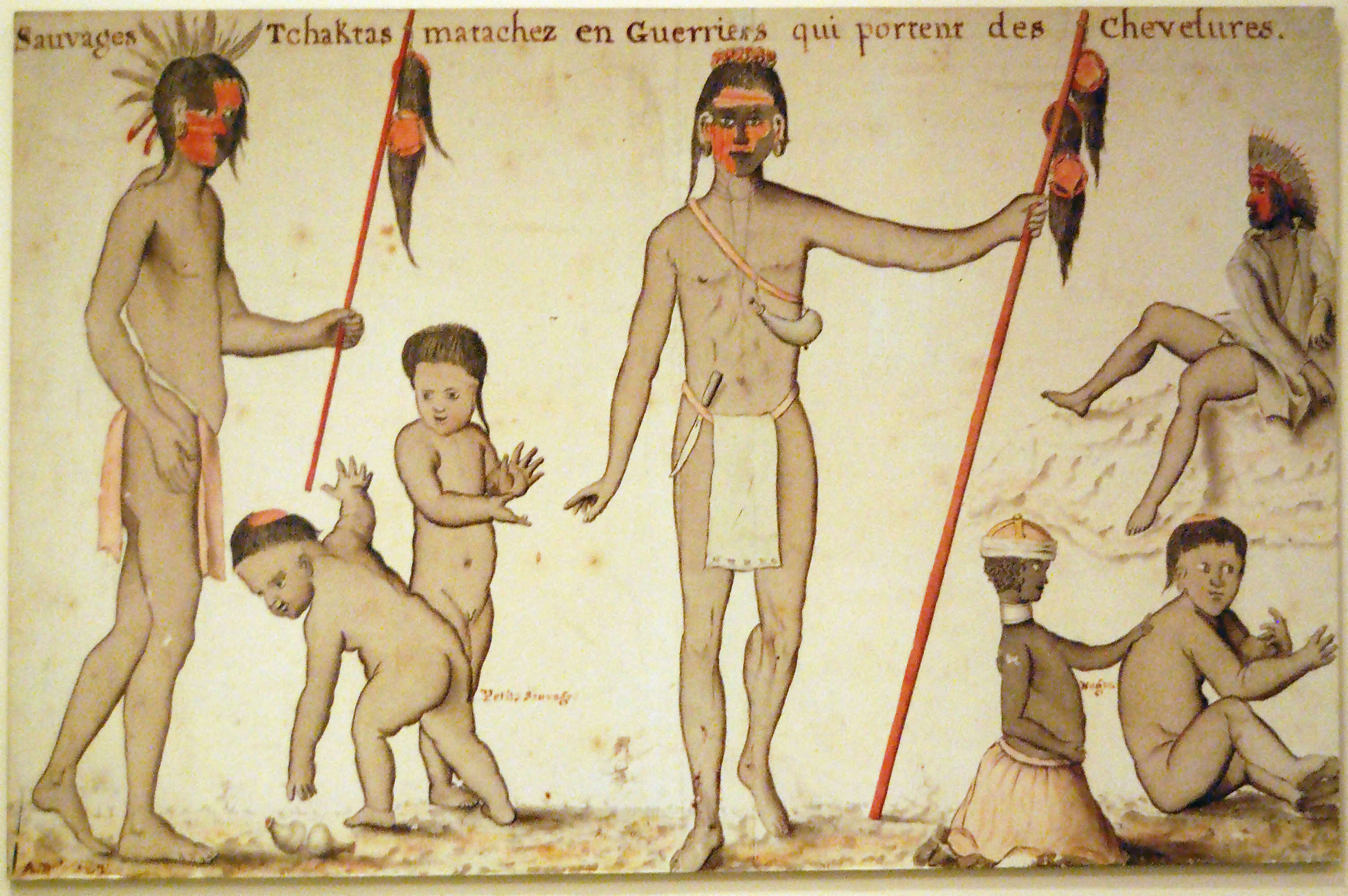
1732 illustration by Alexandre de Batz of Choctaw people of the Mississippi in war paint, bearing scalps

There is substantial archaeological evidence of scalping in North America in the pre-Columbian era. Carbon dating of skulls show evidence of scalping as early as 600 AD; some skulls show evidence of healing from scalping injuries, suggesting at least some victims occasionally survived at least several months. Among Plains Indians, it seems to have been practiced primarily as part of intertribal warfare, with scalps only taken of enemies killed in battle. However, author and historian Mark van de Logt wrote, "Although military historians tend to reserve the concept of 'total war'", in which civilians are targeted, "for conflicts between modern industrial nations," the term "closely approaches the state of affairs between the Pawnees, the Sioux, and the Cheyennes. Noncombatants were legitimate targets. Indeed, the taking of a scalp of a woman or child was considered honorable because it signified that the scalp taker had dared to enter the very heart of the enemy's territory."

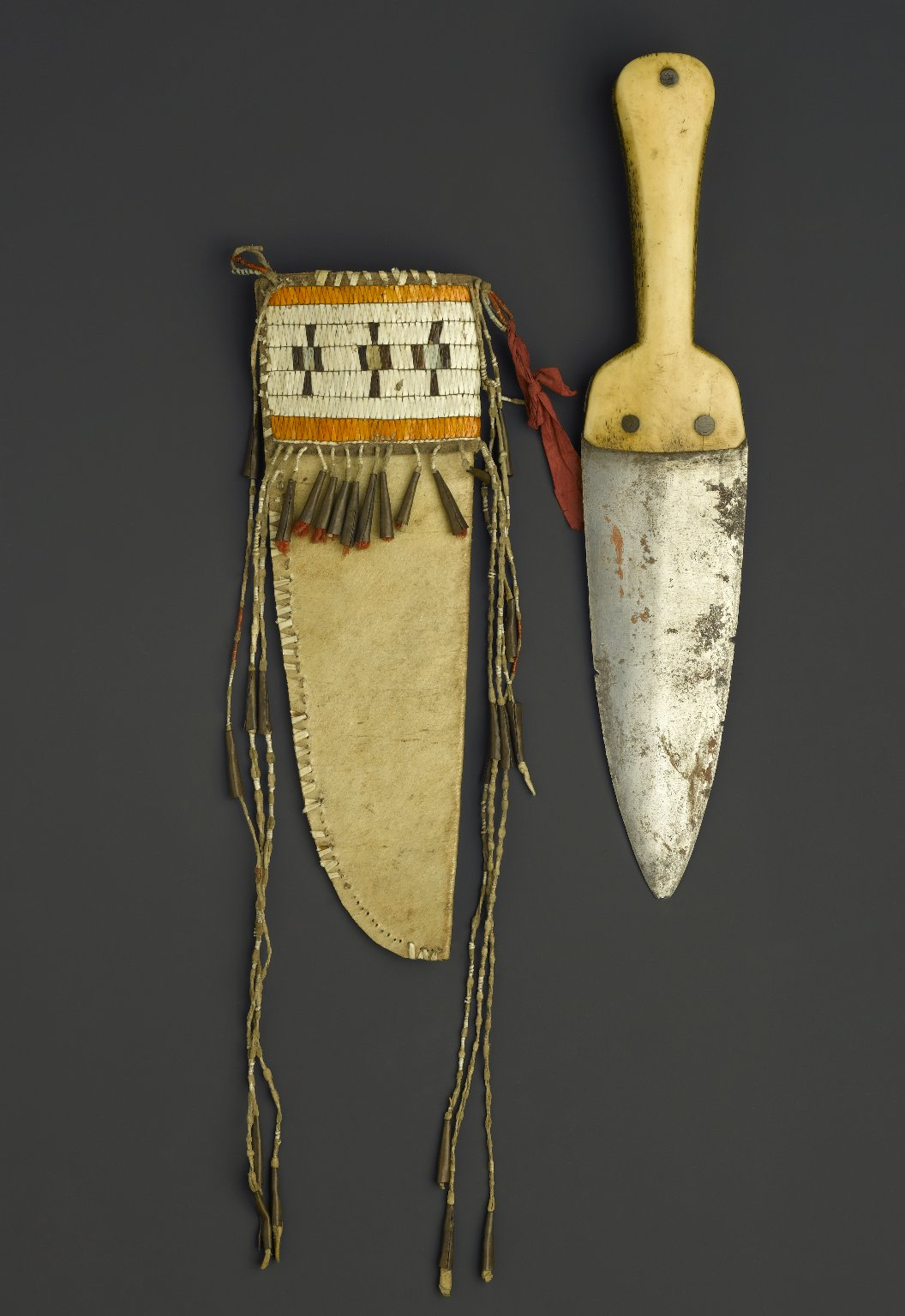
Knife and Sheath, probably Sioux, early 19th century, Brooklyn Museum

Many tribes of Native Americans practiced scalping, in some instances up until the end of the 19th century. Of the approximately 500 bodies at the Crow Creek massacre site, 90 percent of the skulls show evidence of scalping. The event took place circa 1325 AD. Despite centuries of intertribal violence between Indian tribes, European colonisation of the Americas increased the incidence of intertribal conflict, and consequently an increase in the prevalence of scalping amongst the Indians, including the scalping of non-combatants.

=== Colonial invasion by Europeans ===
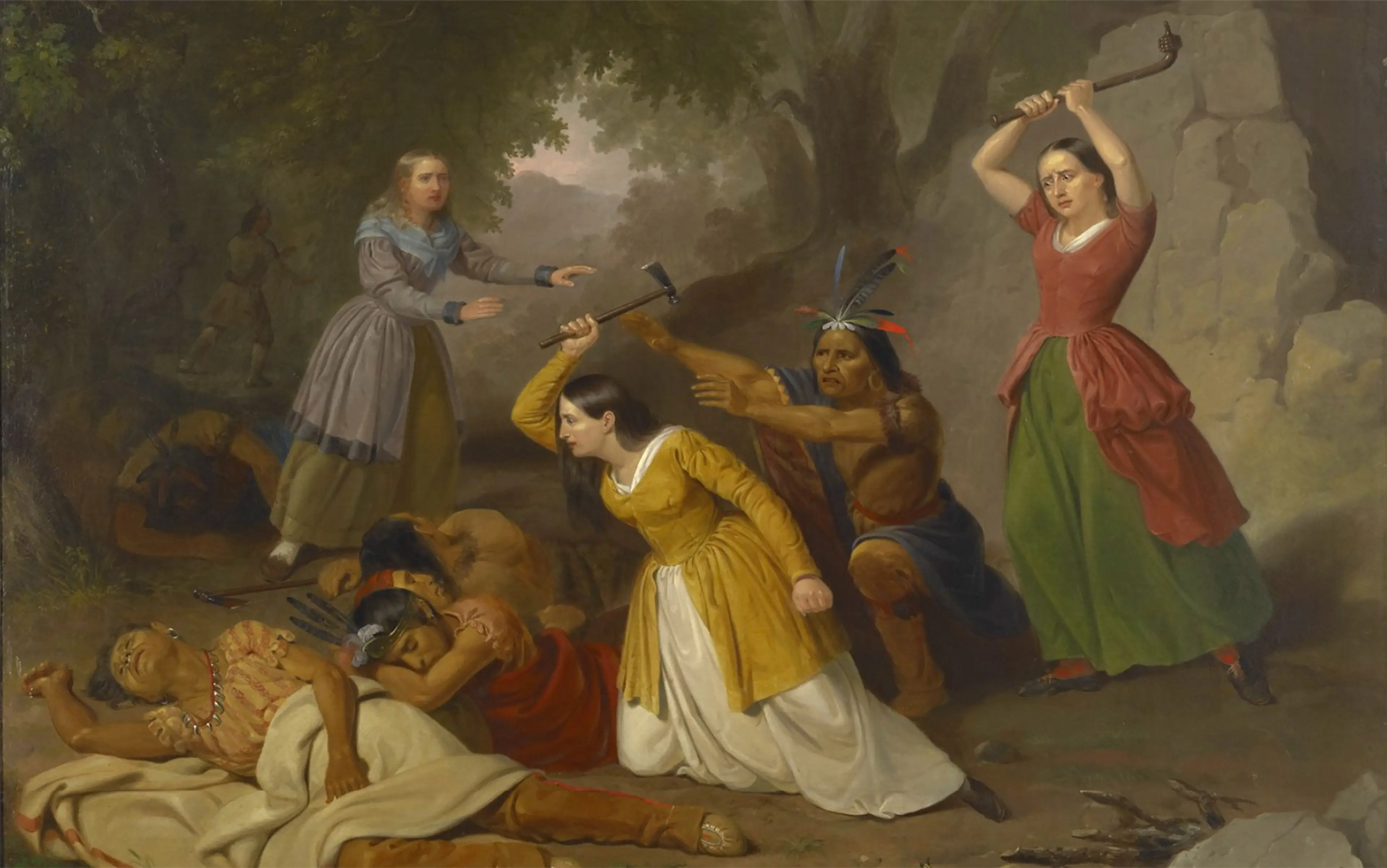
1847 painting of Hannah Duston scalping the sleeping Abenaki family, including six children, who had kidnapped her and murdered her infant after the Raid on Haverhill (1697)

Officials in the English colonies of Connecticut and Massachusetts offered bounties for the heads of killed Indians, and later for just their scalps during the Pequot War. Connecticut authorities specifically reimbursed Mohegans for killing Pequot tribespeople in 1637. Four years later, the Dutch colony of New Amsterdam offered bounties for the heads of Raritans. In 1643, the Haudenosaunee attacked a group of Wendat fur traders and French carpenters near Montreal, killing and scalping three Frenchmen.

Bounties for Indian captives or their scalps appeared in the legislation of several English colonies during the Susquehannock War (1675–77). The New England Colonies offered bounties to white settlers and Narragansett people in 1675 during King Philip's War. By 1692, New France also paid their native allies for scalps of their enemies. In 1697, on the northern frontier of Massachusetts colony, white settler Hannah Duston killed ten of her Abenaki captors during her nighttime escape, presented their ten scalps to the Massachusetts General Court and was rewarded with bounties for two men, two women, and six children, even though colonial authorities had rescinded the law authorizing scalp bounties six months earlier. There were six colonial wars with New England and the Haudenosaunee Confederacy fighting New France and the Wabanaki Confederacy over a 75-year period, starting with King William's War in 1688. All sides scalped victims, including noncombatants, during this frontier warfare. Bounty policies originally intended only for Native American scalps were extended to enemy colonists.

Massachusetts created a scalp bounty during King William's War in July 1689, and continued doing so during Queen Anne's War in 1703. During Father Rale's War (1722–1725), on August 8, 1722, Massachusetts put a bounty on native families, paying 100 pounds sterling for the scalps of male Indians aged 12 and over, and 50 pounds sterling for women and children. Ranger John Lovewell is known to have conducted scalp-hunting expeditions, the most famous being the Battle of Pequawket in New Hampshire.

In the 1710s and 1720s, New France engaged in frontier warfare with the Natchez people and the Meskwaki people, during which both sides employed the practice. In response to repeated attacks on British settlers by the French and their native allies during King George's War, Massachusetts Governor William Shirley issued a bounty in 1746 to be paid to British-allied Indians for the scalps of French-allied Indian men, women, and children. New York passed a scalp act in 1747.

During Father Le Loutre's War and the Seven Years' War in Nova Scotia and Acadia, French colonists offered payments to Indians for British scalps. In 1749, governor of Nova Scotia Edward Cornwallis created an proclamation which included a bounty for male scalps or prisoners, though no scalps were turned in. During the Seven Years' War, governor of Nova Scotia Charles Lawrence offered a reward for male Mi'kmaq scalps in 1756. In 2000, Mi'kmaq activists argued that this proclamation was still legal in Nova Scotia, though government officials pointed out that it was no longer legal because the bounty was superseded by the Halifax Treaties.

During the French and Indian War, as of June 12, 1755, Massachusetts governor William Shirley was offering a bounty of £40 for a male Indian scalp, and £20 for scalps of females or of children under 12 years old. In 1756, Pennsylvania Lieutenant Governor Robert Morris, in his declaration of war against the Lenni Lenape (Delaware) people, offered "130 Pieces of Eight, for the Scalp of Every Male Indian Enemy, above the Age of Twelve Years," and "50 Pieces of Eight for the Scalp of Every Indian Woman, produced as evidence of their being killed."

Although much has been made of the existence of scalp bounties, generally because they have been easily accessible as statutes, little research exists on the numbers of bounties actually paid. Early frontier warfare in forested areas in the era of flintlock muzzle-loading rifles favored tomahawks and knives over firearms because of the long loading time after a shot was fired. Advantage was clearly held by bow, knife, and hatchet. Some states had a history of escalating the payout of bounties offered per scalp, presumably because lower bounties were ineffective and were not worth risking one's life in exchange for the payoff. Rising bounties were a measure of bounty system failure.

=== American Revolutionary War ===
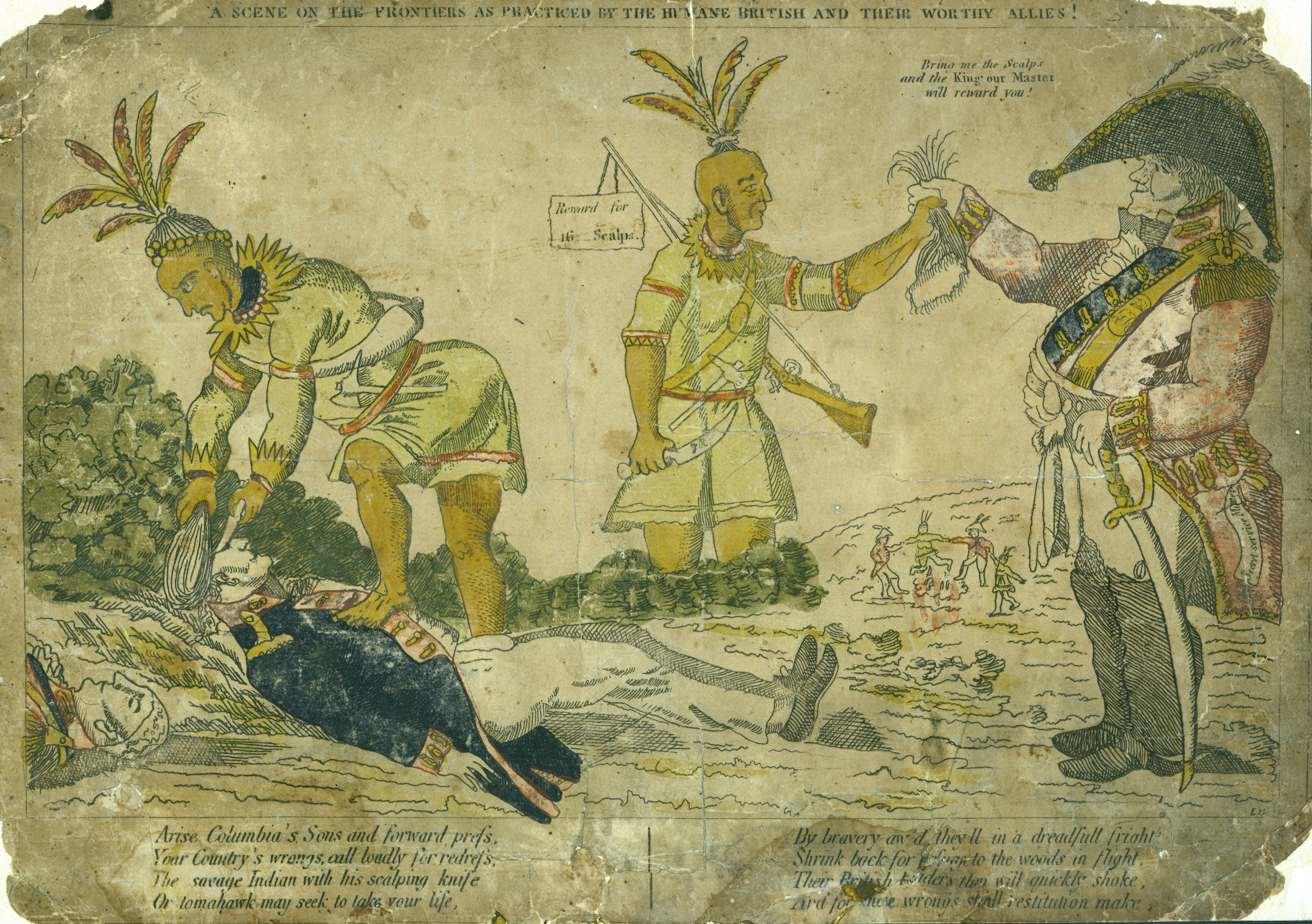
An American political cartoon made during the War of 1812. It depicts a British officer giving a Native warrior (referred to as a "Savage Indian") a reward for an American soldier's scalp accompanied by a poem.

During the American Revolutionary War, British Indian Department official Henry Hamilton was nicknamed the "hair-buyer general" by American Patriots as they believed he encouraged and paid British-allied Natives to scalp Americans. As a result, when Hamilton was captured by American troops, he was treated as a war criminal instead of a prisoner of war. However, American historians have noted that there was no proof that he had ever offered rewards for scalps, and no British officer paid for scalps during the conflict.

However, both sides of the war scalped enemy corpses. The September 13, 1779 journal entry of American Lieutenant William Barton recounted how U.S. troops scalped Native dead during the Sullivan Expedition. British-allied Haudenosaunee also practiced scalping. The most famous case was that of Jane McCrea, whose fiancé was a Loyalist officer. She was abducted by two Haudenosaunee warriors and ultimately scalped and shot. Her death inspired many American colonists to resist a British invasion from Canada, which ended in defeat at the battles of Saratoga.

=== Mexico ===
During the Apache–Mexico Wars in 1835, the government of the Mexican state of Sonora put a bounty on the Apache which, over time, evolved into a payment by the government of 100 pesos for each scalp of a male 14 or more years old. In 1837, the Mexican state of Chihuahua also offered a bounty on Apache scalps, 100 pesos per warrior, 50 pesos per woman, and 25 pesos per child. Harris Worcester wrote: "The new policy attracted a diverse group of men, including Anglos, runaway slaves led by Seminole John Horse, and Indians — Kirker used Delawares and Shawnees; others, such as Terrazas, used Tarahumaras; and Seminole chief Coacoochee led a band of his own people who had fled from Indian Territory." Mexico's scalp bounties were infamously exploited by the Glanton gang: originally charged with fighting the Apache, the gang later began to take scalps from peaceful Natives and non-Native Mexicans.

=== American Civil War ===
Some scalping incidents occurred during the American Civil War of 1861-1865. For example, Confederate guerrillas led by "Bloody Bill" Anderson were well known for decorating their saddles with the scalps of Union soldiers they had killed. Archie Clement had the reputation of being Anderson's “chief scalper”.

=== Continued Indian Wars ===
In 1851, the U.S. Army displayed Indian scalps in Stanislaus County, California.

In 1851, the Tehama Massacre occurred in Tehama County, California, wherein U.S. military and citizens razed villages and scalped hundreds of men, women, and children. This attack targeted Native communities specifically, in the villages of Yana, Konkow, Nisenan, Wintu, Nomlaki, Patwin, Yuki, and Maidu.

Scalping also occurred during the Sand Creek Massacre on November 29, 1864, during the American Indian Wars, when a 700-man force of U.S. Army volunteers destroyed the village of Cheyenne and Arapaho in southeastern Colorado Territory, killing and mutilating an estimated 70–163 Native American civilians. An 1867 New York Times article reported that "settlers in a small town in Colorado Territory had recently subscribed $5,000 to a fund ‘for the purpose of buying Indian scalps (with $25 each to be paid for scalps with the ears on)’ and that the market for Indian scalps ‘is not affected by age or sex’." The article noted this behavior was "sanctioned" by the U.S. federal government, and was modeled on patterns the U.S. had begun a century earlier in the "American East".

According to Carroll P. Kakel, it was a "uniquely American" innovation that the use of scalp bounties in the wars against indigenous societies "became an indiscriminate killing process that deliberately targeted Indian non-combatants (including women, children, and infants), as well as warriors". Some American states such as Arizona paid bounties for enemy Native American scalps.

== Image gallery ==
Gallery
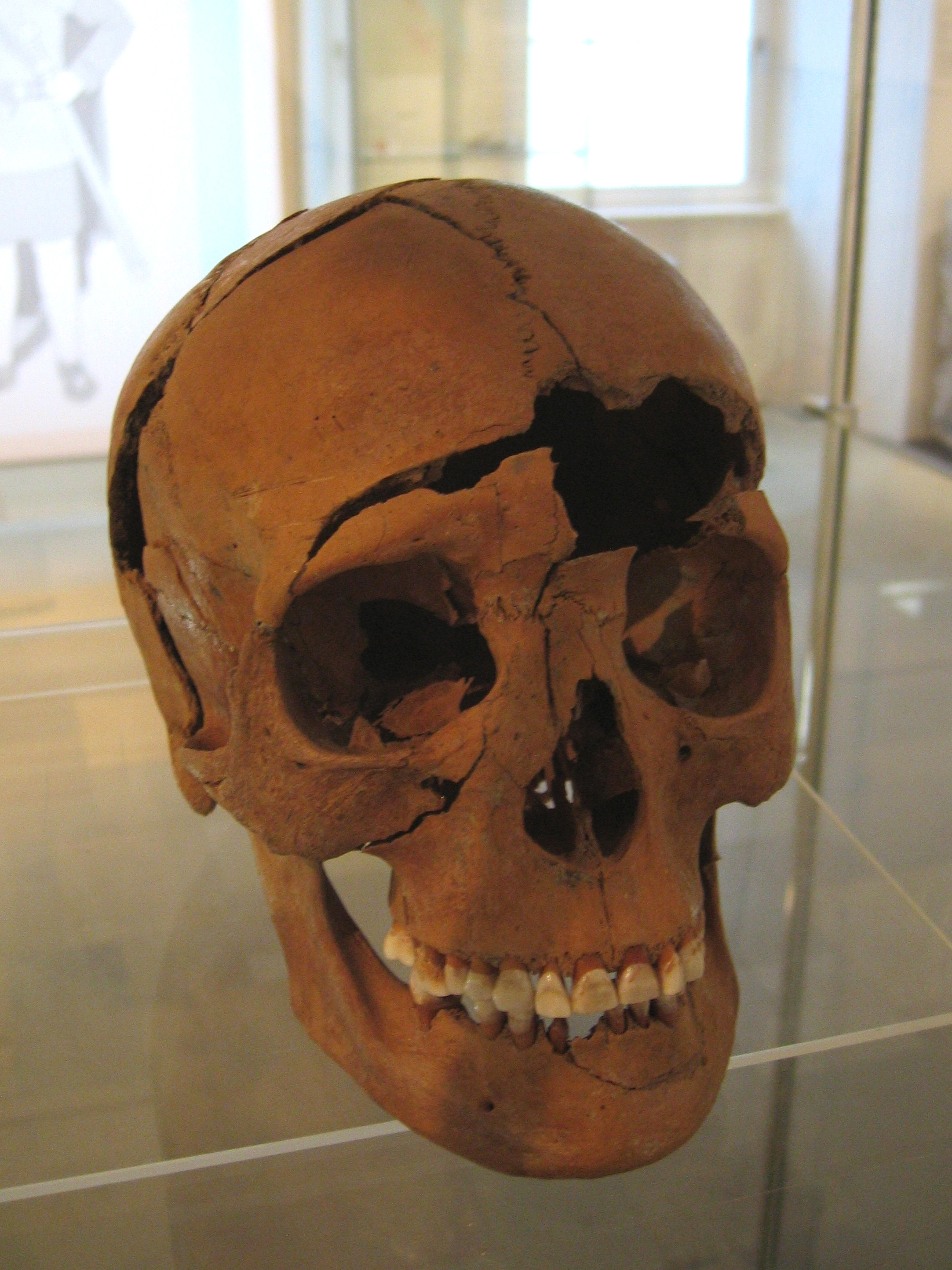
Skull of a 20- to 30-year-old decapitated woman of the 3rd century AD, in Germany. Cutting marks above the right eye socket show the head has been scalped.

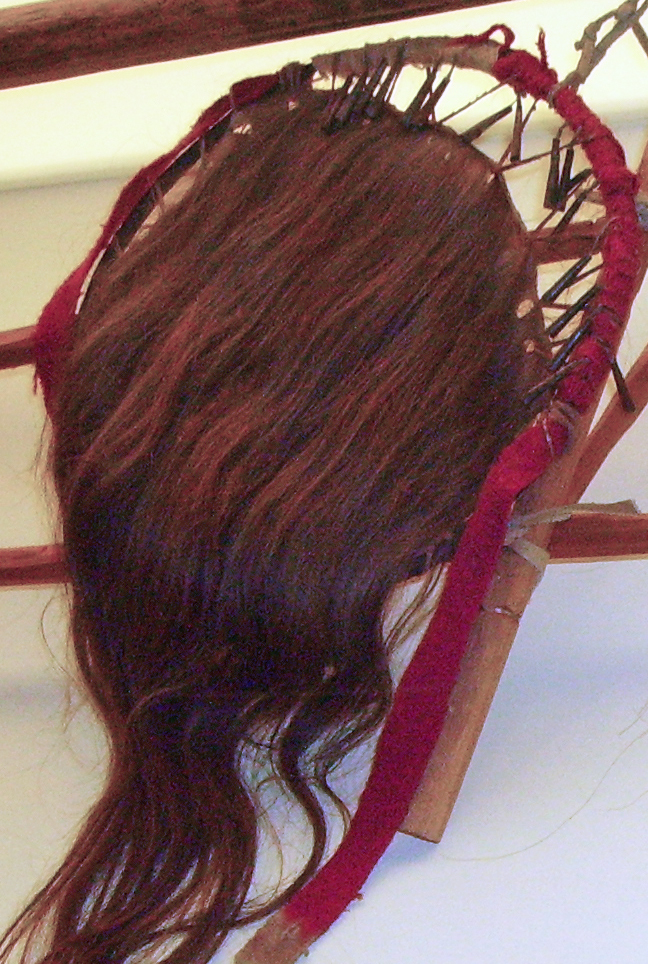
Scalp

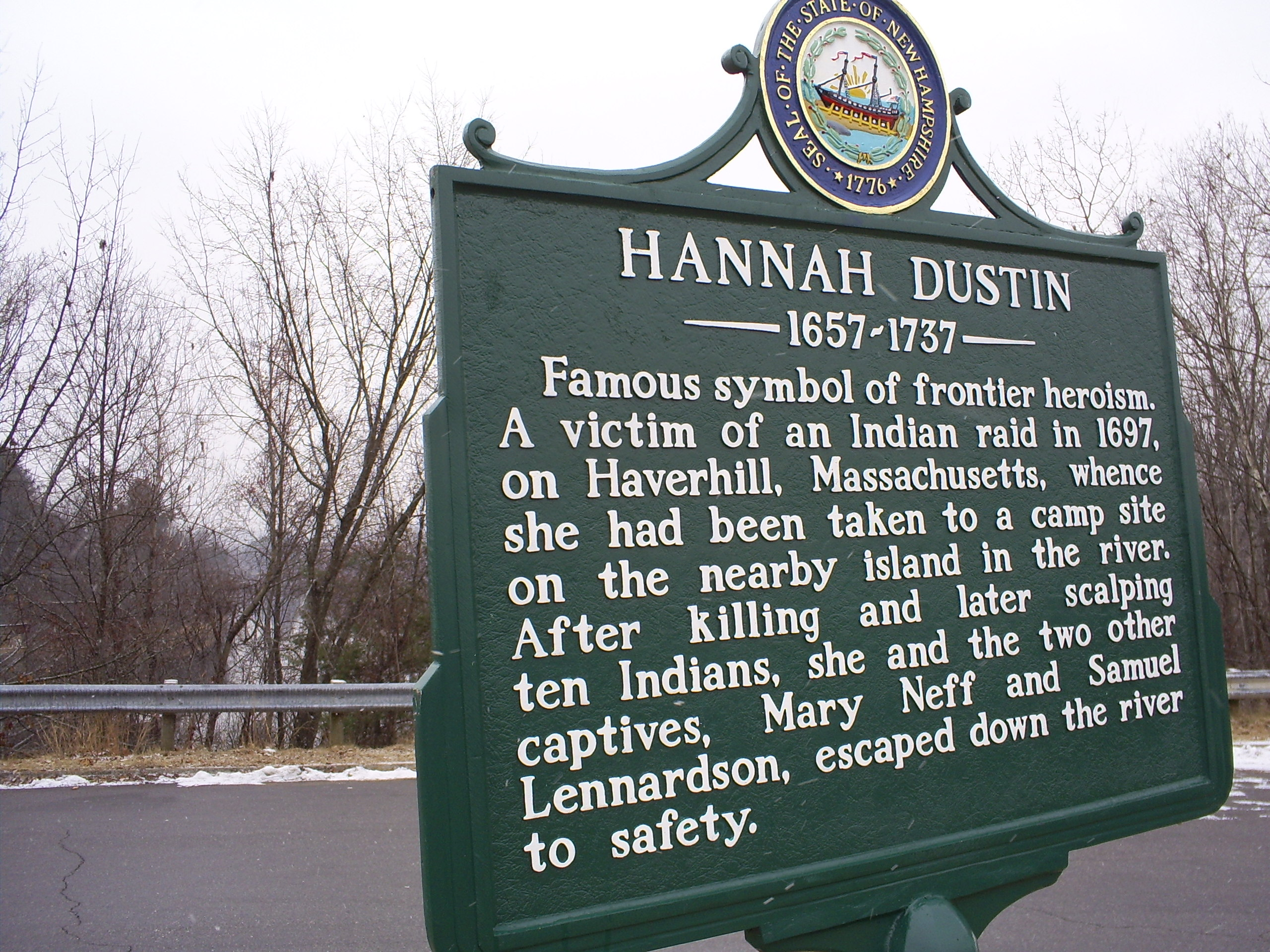
Modern roadside historical marker in Boscawen, New Hampshire, about the 1697 scalping incident involving Hannah Duston

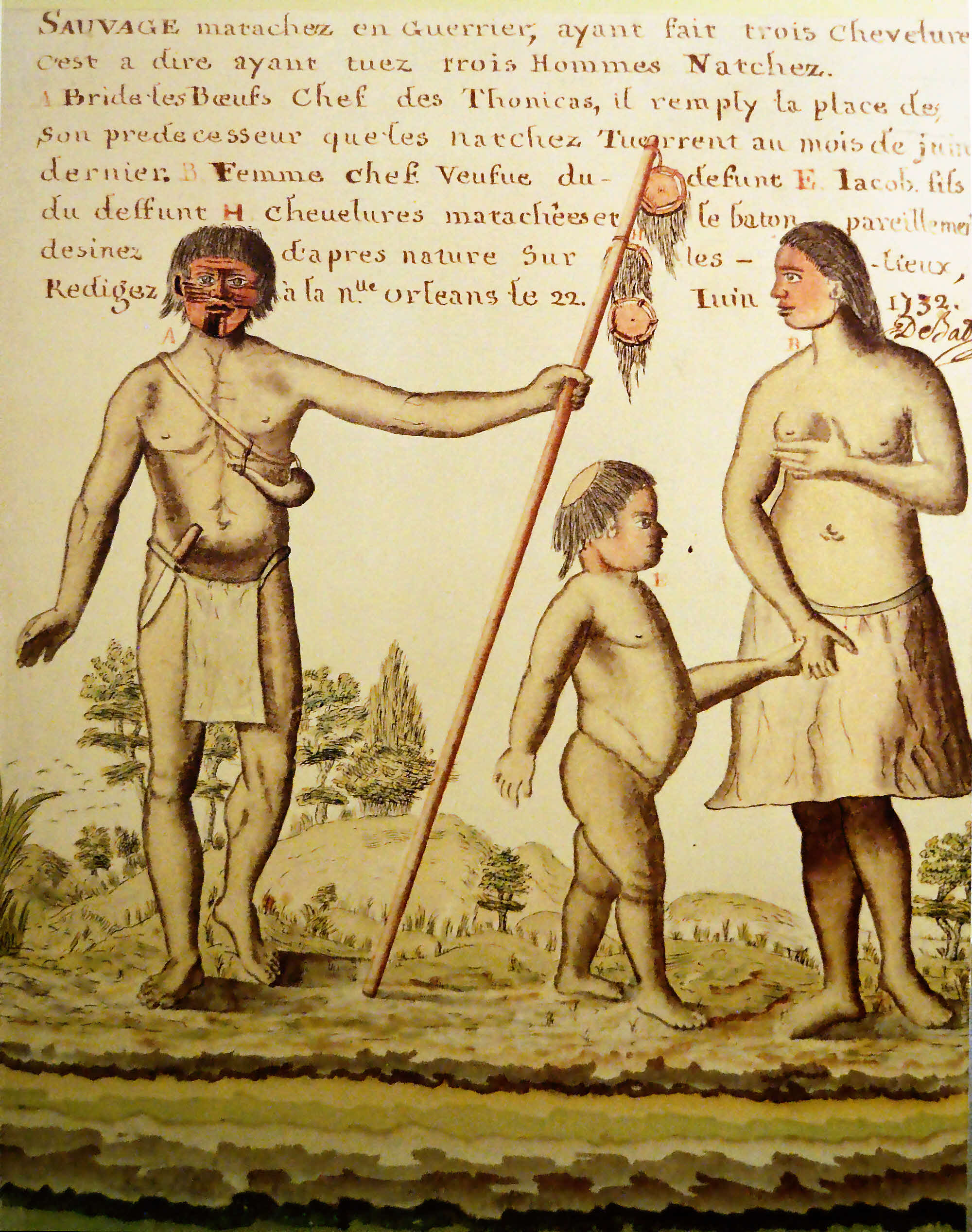
Sauvage matachez en Guerrier (1732), by Alexandre de Batz

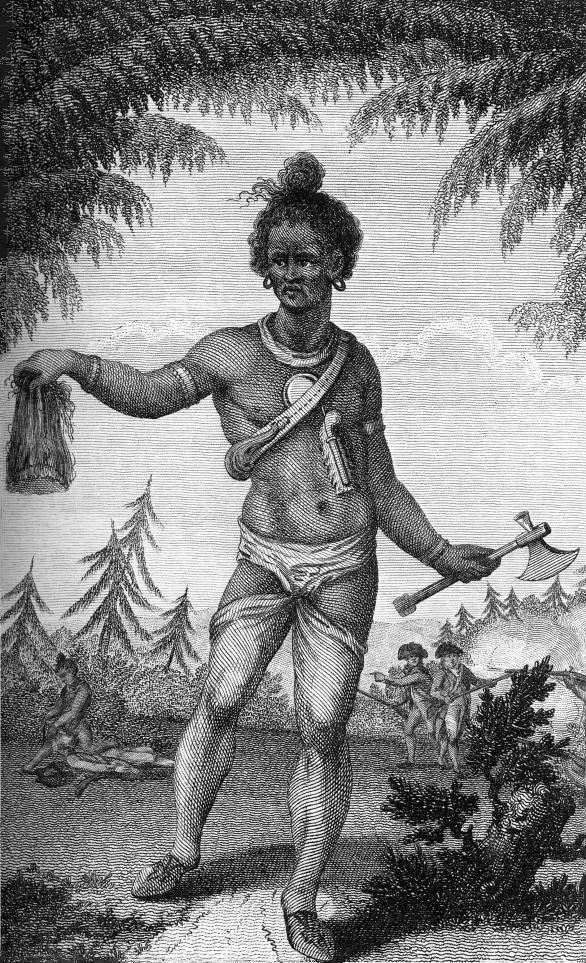
Indian Warrior with Scalp (1789), by Barlow

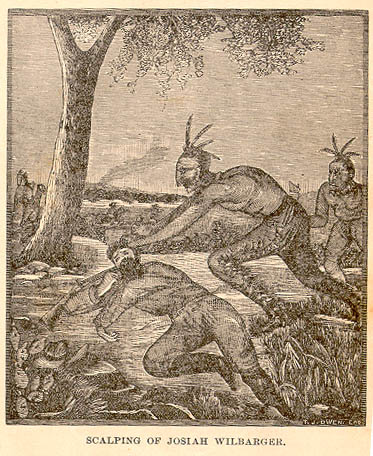
Josiah P. Wilbarger being scalped by Comanche Indians, 1833

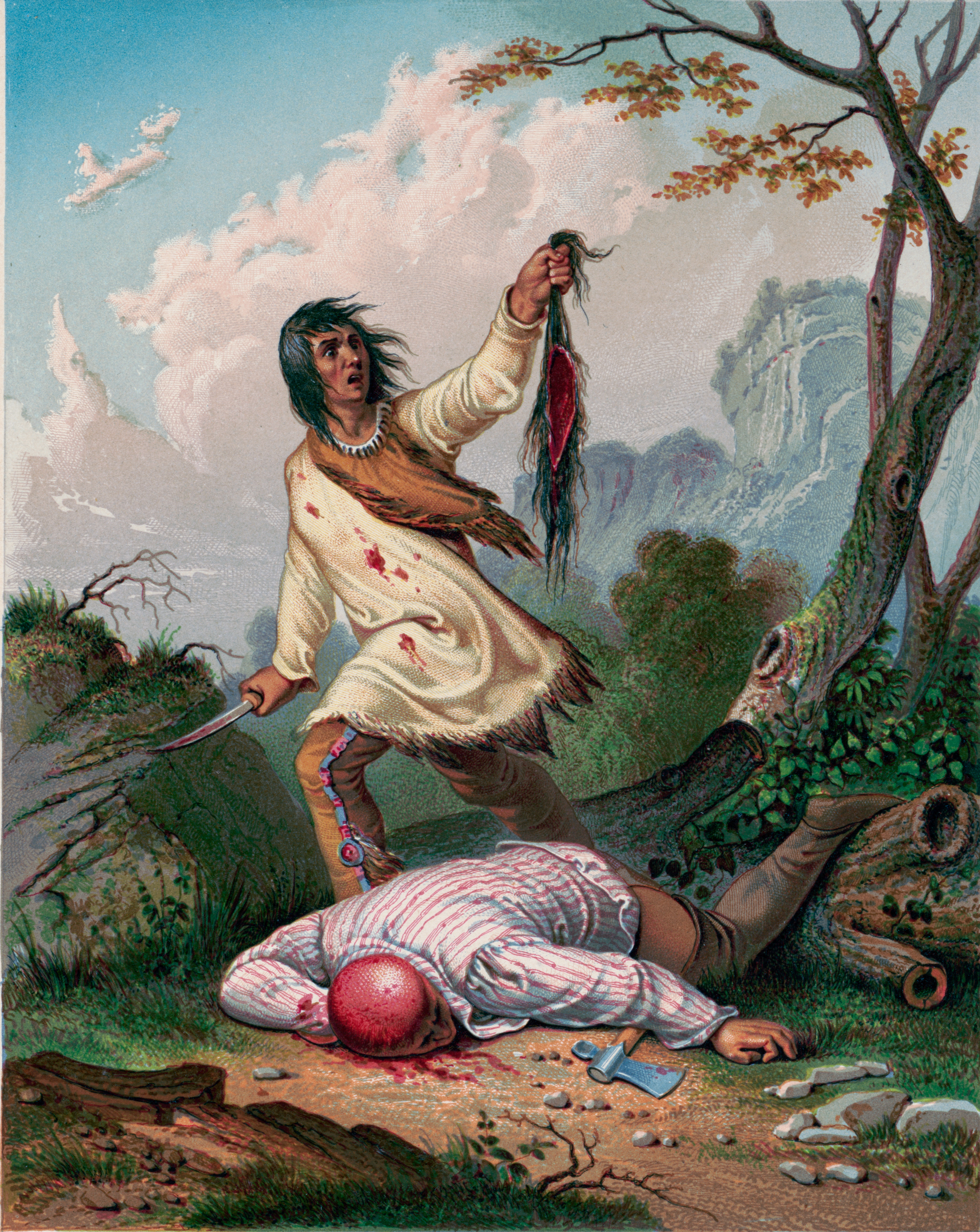
Lithograph depiction of scalping, circa 1850s

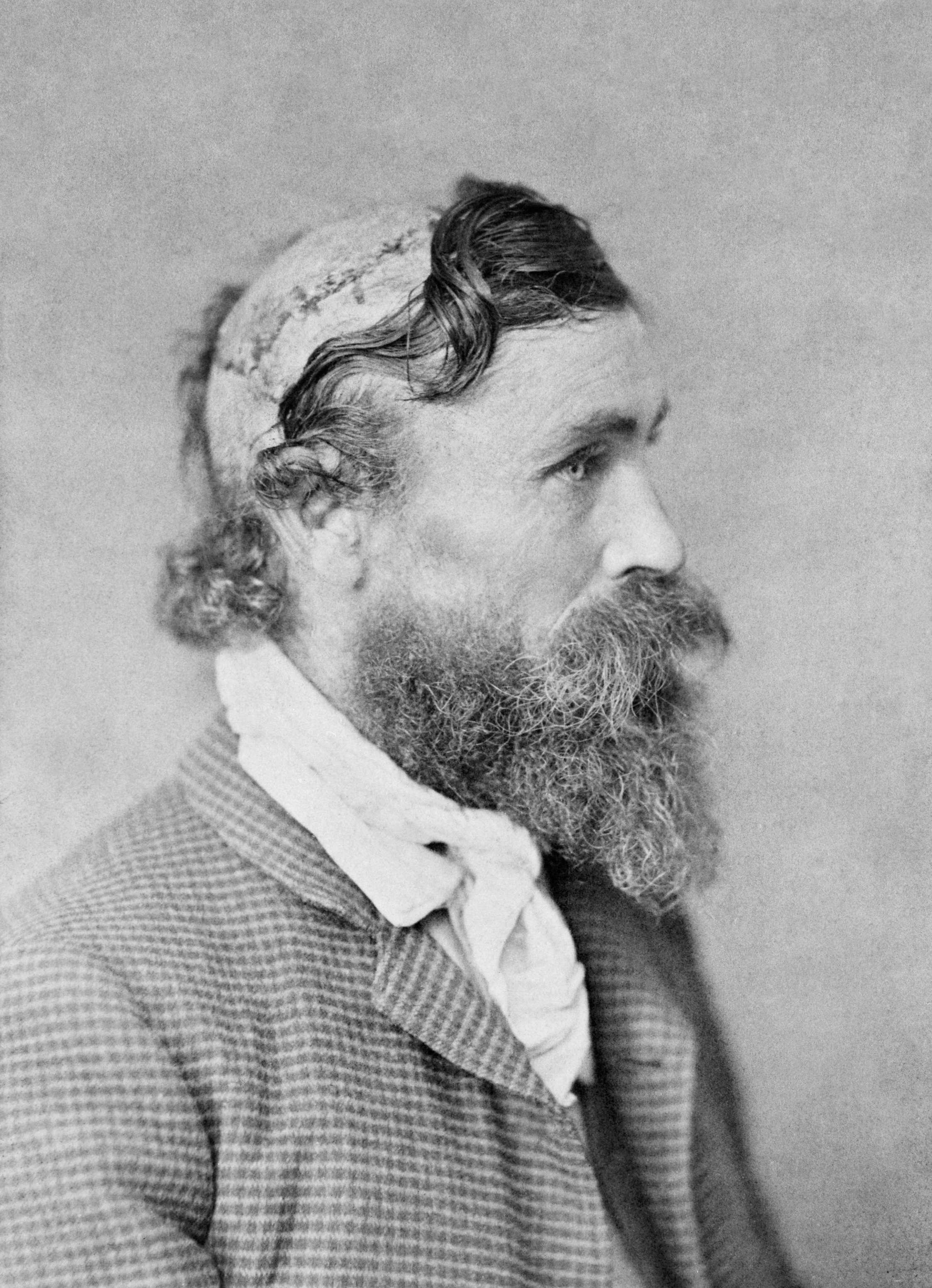
Survivor Robert McGee was scalped as a child in 1864 by Sioux —photo c. 1890.

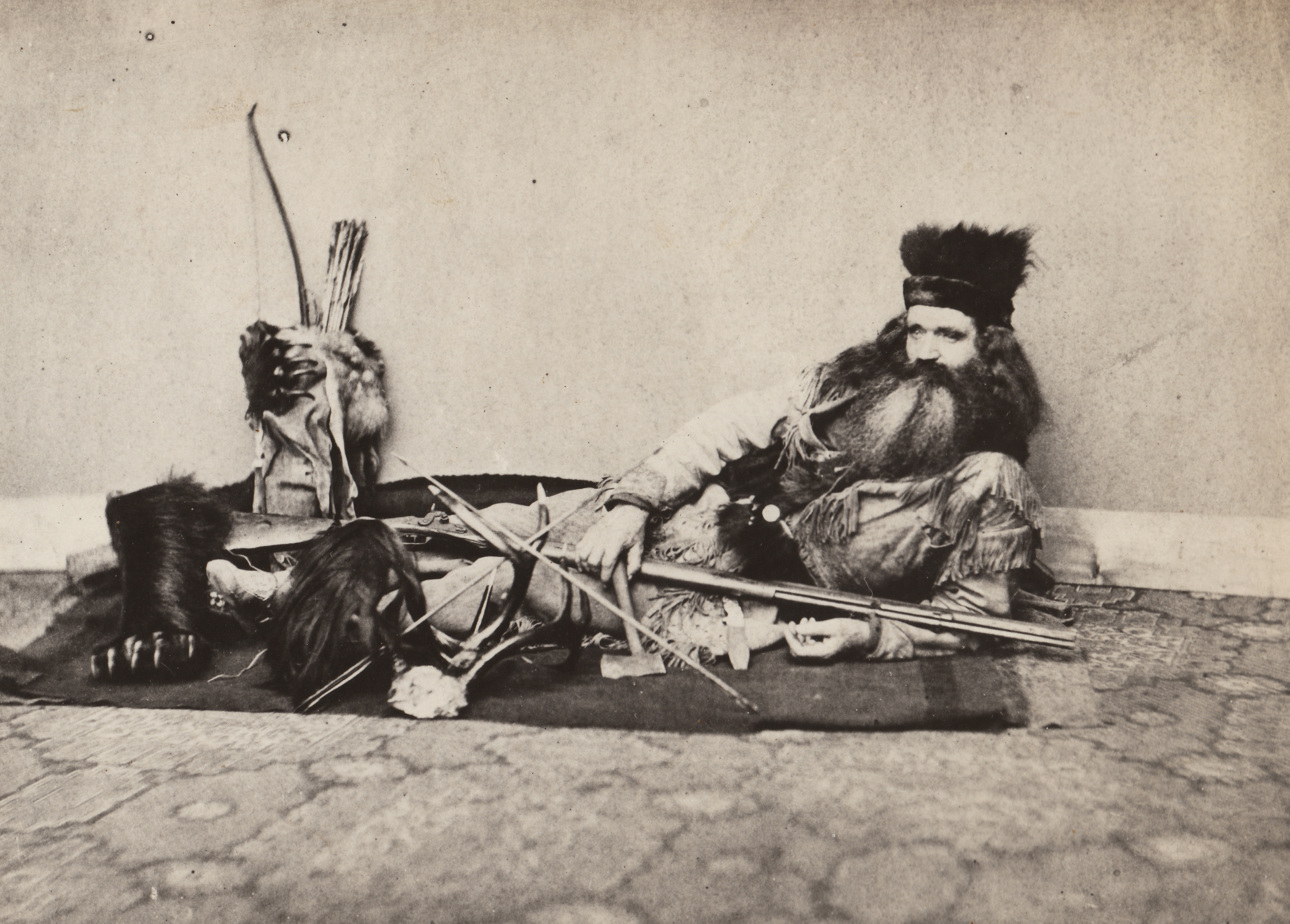
1864 photo of Californian Seth Kinman displaying an Indian scalp (front left). He collected "Indian artifacts" including scalps.

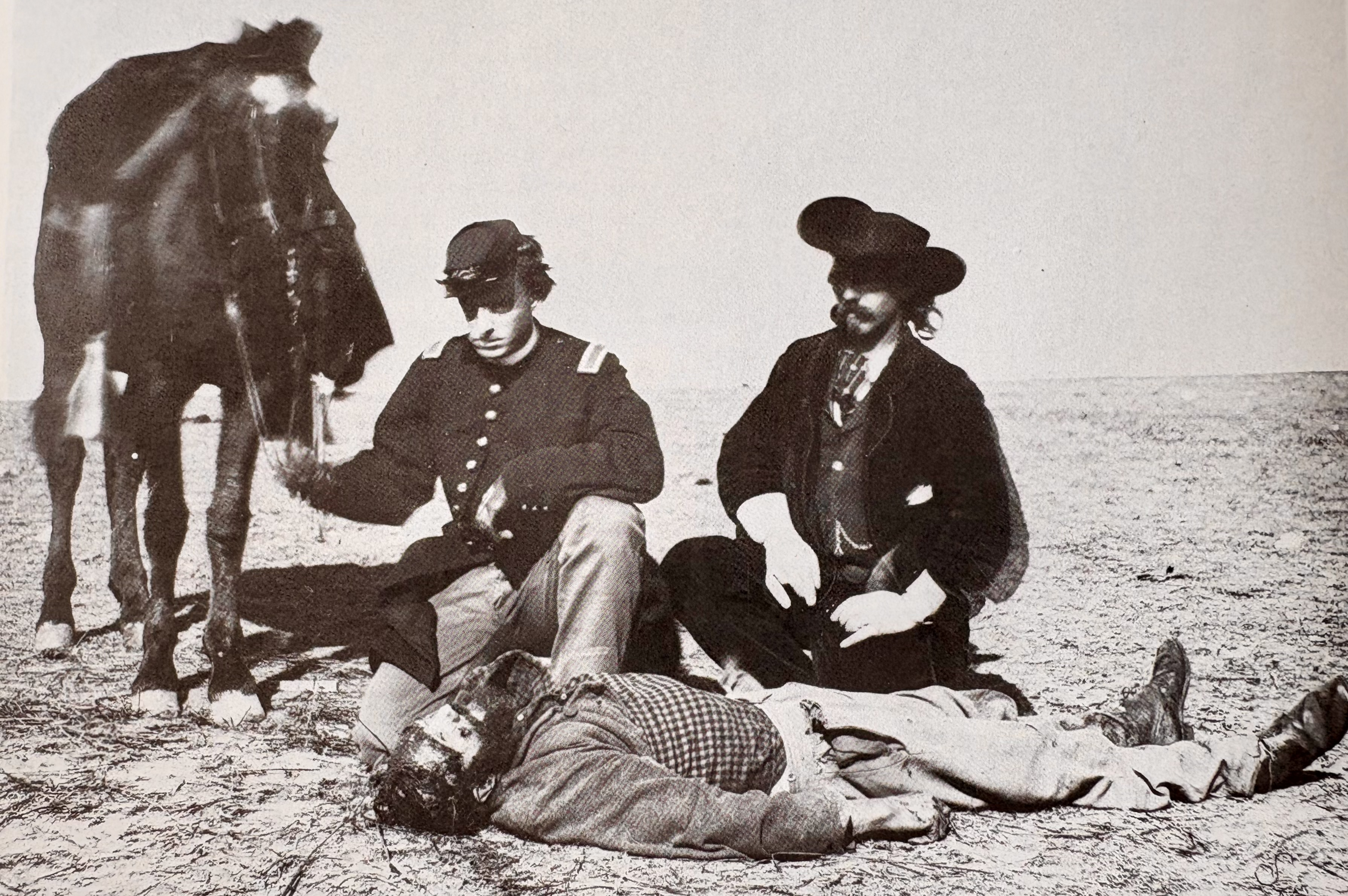
Scalped corpse of buffalo hunter Ralph Morrison found after an 1868 encounter with Cheyennes, near Fort Dodge, Kansas

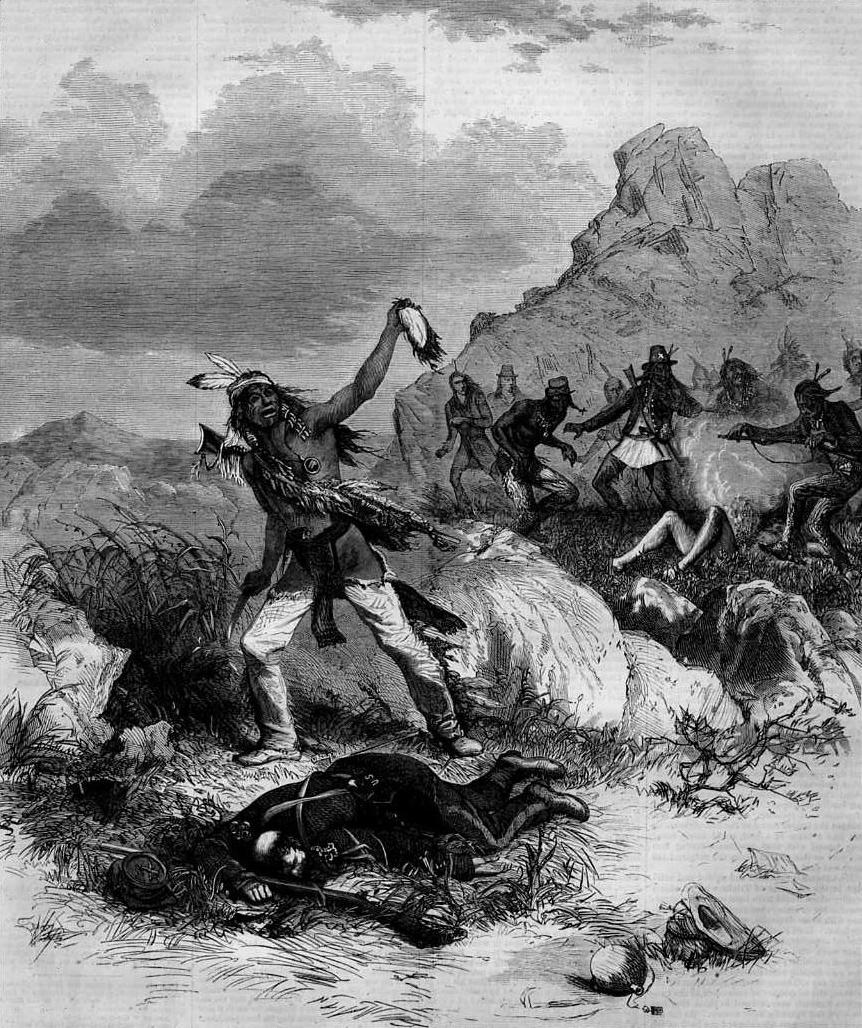
Modocs scalping and torturing prisoners, published in May 1873

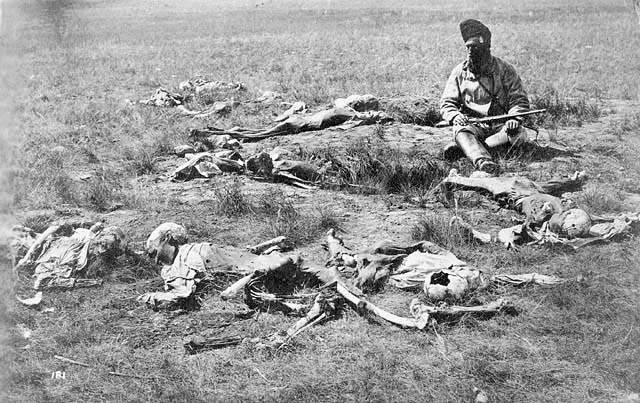
The remains of dead Crow Indians killed and scalped by Piegan Blackfeet c. 1874

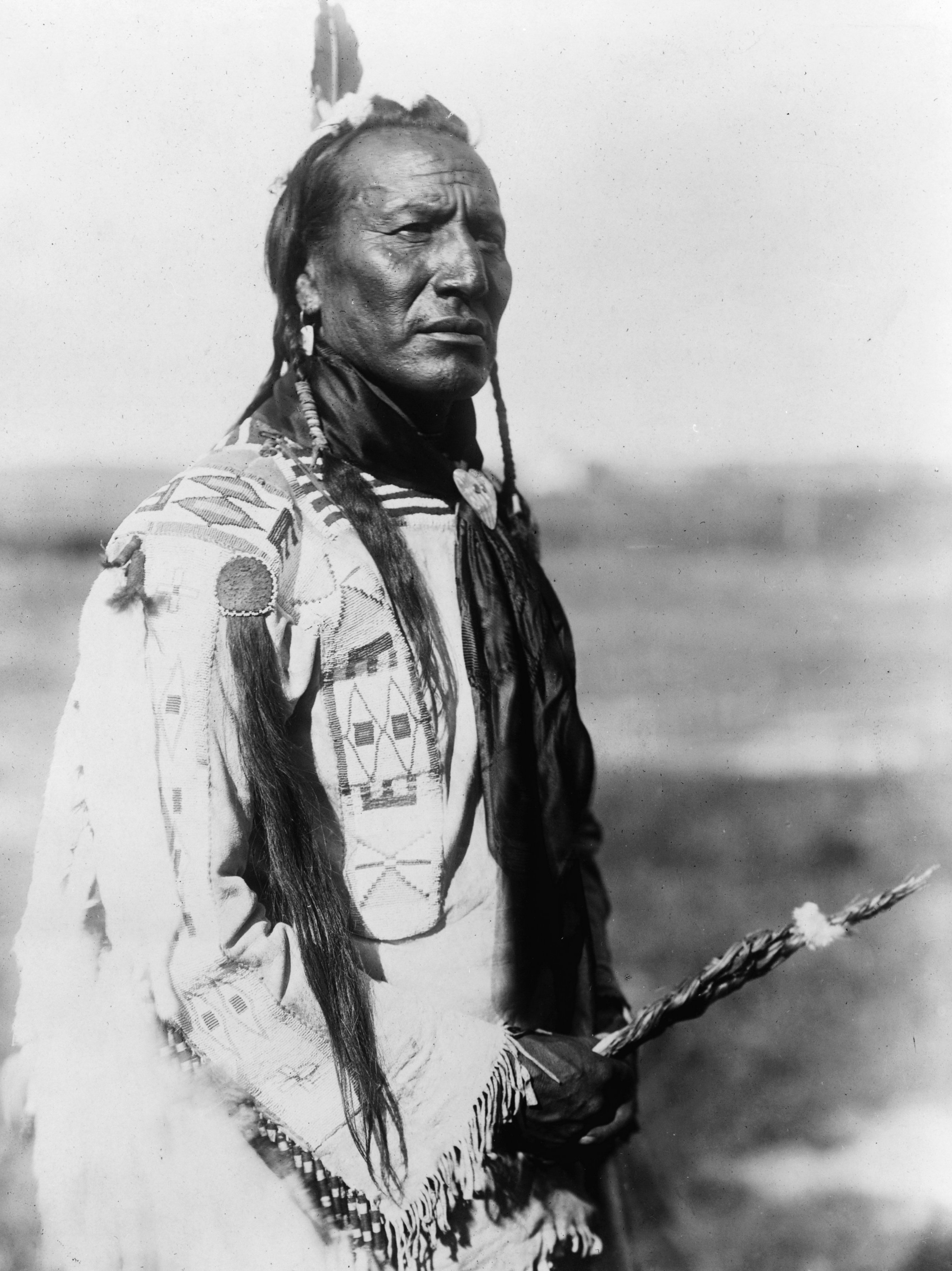
Native American Big Mouth Spring with decorated scalp lock on right shoulder. 1910 photograph by Edward S. Curtis.

== See also ==
- Headhunting
- Pitchcapping
- Shrunken head

== Bibliography ==
- Axtell, James. "Scalps and Scalping". Encyclopedia of North American Indians. Archived from the original on 2002-12-23.
- Billard, Jules B. (1974). World of the American Indian (1st ed.). Washington DC: National Geographic Society.
- Burton, Richard F. (1864). "Notes on Scalping". Anthropological Review. II: 49–52.
- Arthur, Elizabeth (1979). "Hamilton, Henry". In Halpenny, Francess G. (ed.). Dictionary of Canadian Biography. Vol. IV (1771–1800) (online ed.). University of Toronto Press.
- Grenier, John (2008). The Far Reaches of Empire. War in Nova Scotia, 1710-1760. Norman: U of Oklahoma Press.
- Grenier, John (2005). The First Way of War: American War Making on the Frontier. Cambridge University Press.
- Griffin, Anastasia M. (2008). Georg Friederici's (1906) "Scalping and Similar Warfare Customs in America" with a Critical Introduction. p. 248. ISBN 9780549562092.
- Kelsey, Isabel (1984). Joseph Brant 1743–1807: Man of Two Worlds. Syracuse University Press. ISBN 0-8156-0182-4.
- Mensforth, Robert P.; Chacon, Richard J. (editor); Dye, David H. (editor) (2007). "Human Trophy Taking in Eastern North America During the Archaic Period: The Relationship to Warfare and Social Complexity". The Taking and Displaying of Human Body Parts as Trophies by Amerindians. Springer Science + Business Media: 225.
