= Imran Khan: The Cricketer, the Celebrity, the Politician =

2009 biography by Christopher Sandford

- Author: Christopher Sandford
- Language: English
- Subject: Imran Khan; Cricket; Politics of Pakistan
- Genre: Biography
- Publisher: HarperCollins
- Publication date: 2009
- Publication place: United Kingdom
- Media type: Print
- Pages: 402
- ISBN: 978-0-00-726285-4

Imran Khan: The Cricketer, the Celebrity, the Politician is a 2009 biography by Christopher Sandford about Pakistani cricketer, philanthropist, and politician Imran Khan. Published by HarperCollins in London, the book follows Khan's life from his early cricket career and rise to international celebrity through his charitable work and entry into Pakistani politics.

== Synopsis ==
The first eight of the book's ten chapters deal primarily with Khan's cricketing life, including his beginnings in Lahore and at Oxford, and his rise as a bowler and all-rounder in county and representative cricket. The book also includes discussion of Pakistan cricket's internal rivalries and instability, which Sandford links to the country's broader political culture.

Sandford examines Khan's sporting achievements, his celebrity and social life, his marriage to Jemima Goldsmith, his fundraising for cancer treatment, and his political career. The book's final chapters shift to Khan's political ambitions and his stated wish to bring social change in Pakistan.

== Reception ==
Reviewing the book in Dawn, M. Hanif said that Sandford had undertaken a "daunting task" and produced a biography that was "interesting, informative and at times entertaining". He also described it as the first serious biography of Khan to be published in English in fifteen years. Hanif nonetheless criticized Sandford for failing to identify sources for some claims about Khan's personal life and argued that the book's final political chapters read too much like newspaper reporting, leaving readers interested in Khan's political future disappointed.

In a 2012 review for Cricket Web, Stuart Wark wrote that Sandford managed to avoid becoming either overly critical or overly adulating, and called the biography an "engaging analysis" of Khan's complex character. Wark argued that the book had superseded Ivo Tennant's 1994 biography of Khan because it covered the intervening two decades of his life. The book was also reviewed by the International Journal of the History of Sport.
