= Hannah Duston =

Colonial Massachusetts Puritan mother

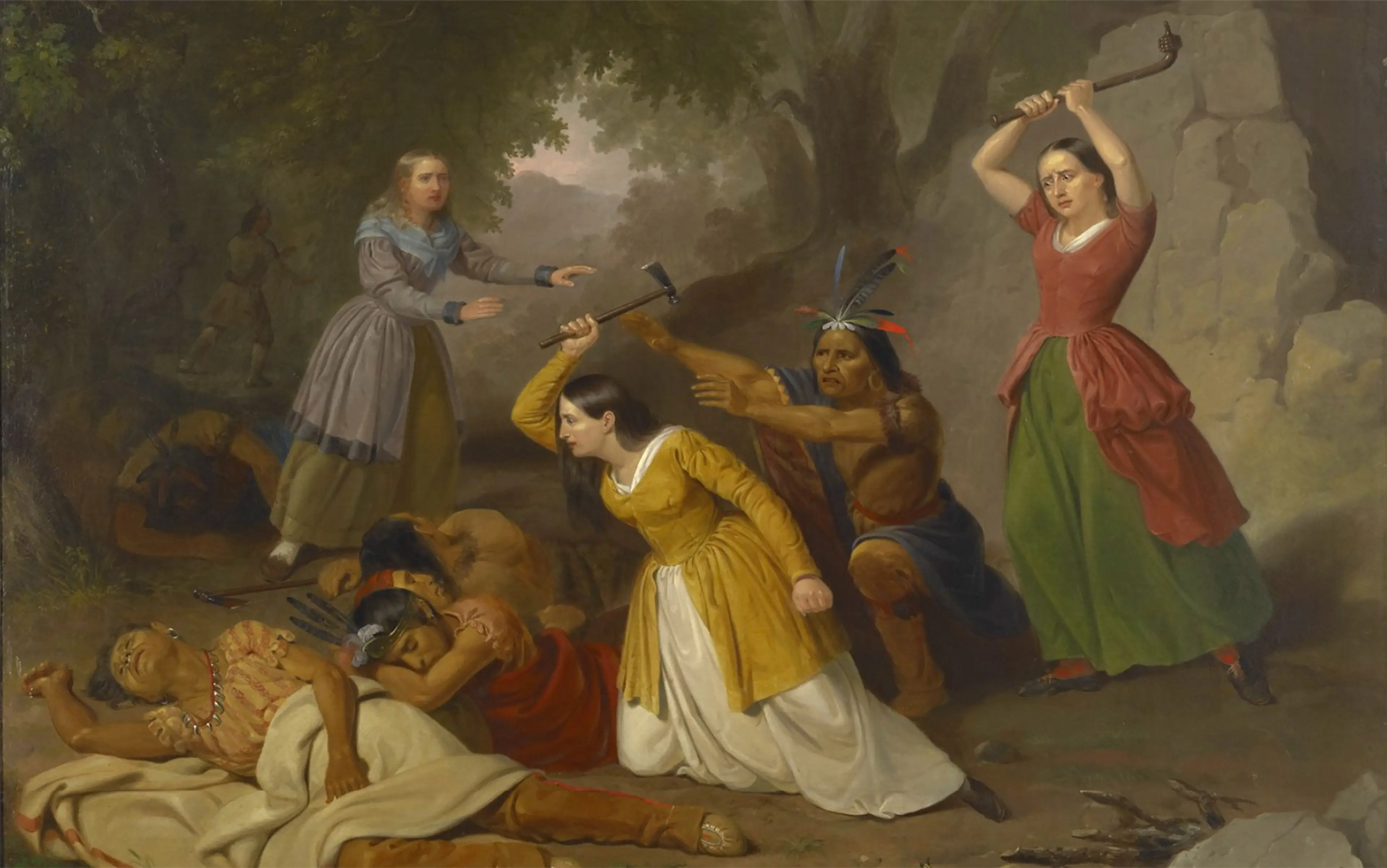
- Hannah Duston Killing the Indians (1847) by Junius Brutus Stearns
- Born: Hannah Emerson; December 23, 1657; Haverhill, Massachusetts
- Died: March 6, 1736, 1737 or 1738; Haverhill, Massachusetts
- Known for: Killing and escaping from Abenaki
- Spouse: Thomas Duston Jr. (1652 – c. 1724)
- Parent(s): Michael Emerson, Hannah Webster Emerson

Hannah Duston (also spelled Dustin, Dustan, Durstan, Dustun, Dunstun, or Durstun) (born Hannah Emerson, December 23, 1657 – March 6, 1736, 1737 or 1738) was a colonial Massachusetts Puritan woman who was taken captive by Abenaki people from Quebec during King William's War, with her first newborn daughter, during the 1697 raid on Haverhill, in which 27 colonists, 15 of them children, were killed. In her account given to Cotton Mather, it is stated that the Abenakis killed her newborn baby and several other captives soon after the raid. While detained on an island in the Merrimack River in present-day Boscawen, New Hampshire, she killed and scalped ten of the Abenaki family members holding them hostage, with the assistance of two other captives.

Duston's captivity narrative became famous more than 100 years after she died. During the 19th century, she was referred to as an American folk hero and the "mother of the American tradition of scalp-hunting." Some scholars assert Duston's story became a legend in the 19th century only because her story was used to justify white American violence against Native Americans as innocent, defensive, and virtuous. Duston is believed to be the first American woman honored with a statue.

== Biography ==
=== Early life ===
Hannah Emerson was born December 23, 1657, in Haverhill, Massachusetts, to Michael Emerson and Hannah Webster Emerson; she was the oldest of 15 children. At age 20, she married Thomas Duston Jr., a farmer and brick-maker. The Emerson family would later become the subject of attention when Elizabeth Emerson, Hannah's younger sister, was hanged for infanticide on June 8, 1693. One of Hannah's cousins, Martha Toothaker Emerson, and her father, Roger Toothaker, were accused of practicing witchcraft and tried at the Salem witch trials (1692–93).

=== Captivity ===
During King William's War, Hannah, her husband Thomas, and their nine children, including a newborn baby, lived in Haverhill, Massachusetts. On March 15, 1697, when she was 40 years old, the town was raided by a group of about 30 Abenaki from Quebec. In the attack, 27 colonists were killed (half of them children), and 13 were taken captive, to be either adopted or held as hostages for the French. Hannah's husband Thomas, who was building a new brick home about half a mile away, fled with eight of their nine children. The Indians captured Hannah and her nurse, Mary Neff (1646–1722, née Corliss), set fire to Hannah's home, and forced the two women to march into the wilderness, Hannah carrying her newborn daughter, Martha. According to the account Hannah gave to Cotton Mather, along the way her captors killed six-day-old Martha by smashing her head against a tree:

"About 19 or 20 Indians now led these away, with about half a score of other English captives, but ere they had gone many steps, they dash'd out the brains of the infant against a tree, and several of the other captives, as they began to tire in the sad journey, were soon sent unto their long home."

Hannah and Mary were assigned to a family group of 12 people (probably Pennacooks) and taken north, "unto a rendezvous...somewhere beyond Penacook, New Hampshire; and they still told these poor women that when they came to this town, they must be stript, and scourg'd, and run the gauntlet through the whole army of Indians." The group included Samuel Lennardson (1683–1718, also spelled Leonardson, Lenorson or Lennarson), a 14-year-old boy captured in Worcester, Massachusetts, in late 1695.

=== Rebellion and escape ===
The captives were taken north to an island in the Merrimack River at the mouth of the Contoocook River, where, during the night of April 29 or 30, while the Indians were sleeping, Hannah led Mary and Samuel in a revolt:

"...furnishing themselves with hatchets for the purpose, they struck home such blows upon the heads of their sleeping oppressors, that ere they could any of them struggle...they fell down dead."

Hannah used a hatchet to kill one of the two grown men (Lennardson killed the second), two adult women, and six children. According to Cotton Mather's account, Hannah and her partners let one of the children sleep, "intending to bring him away with them," but the boy awoke and escaped. One severely wounded Abenaki woman also managed to escape the attack. (Note: In 1739, Hannah's neighbor Hannah Heath Bradley, who was also captured by the Indians during the March 15th raid, but who was taken to another Abenaki village, testified that "the next night...there came to us one squaw who said that Hannah Dustan and the aforesaid Mary Neff assisted in killing the Indians of her wigwam, except herself and a boy, herself escaping very narrowly. Shewing to myself and others seven wounds as she said with a hatchet on her head which wounds were given her when the rest were killed.")

The former captives immediately left in a canoe, after scalping the dead as proof of the incident and to collect a bounty. They went downriver, traveling only during the night, and after several days reached Haverhill.

=== Reward ===
A few days later, Thomas Duston brought Hannah, Samuel and Mary to Boston, along with the scalps, the hatchet and a flintlock musket they had taken from the Indians. Although New Hampshire had become a colony in its own right in 1680, the Merrimack River and its adjacent territories were considered part of Massachusetts; therefore, Hannah and the other former captives applied to the Massachusetts Government for the scalp bounty.

Massachusetts had posted a bounty of 50 pounds per scalp in September 1694, which was reduced to 25 pounds in June 1695, and then entirely repealed in December 1696. Wives had no legal status at that time in colonial New England, so her husband petitioned the Legislature on behalf of Hannah Duston, requesting that the bounties for the scalps be paid, even though the law providing for them had been repealed:

"The Humble Petition of Thomas Durstan of Haverhill Sheweth That the wife of ye petitioner (with one Mary Neff) hath in her Late captivity among the Barbarous Indians, been disposed & assisted by heaven to do an extraordinary action, in the just slaughter of so many of the Barbarians, as would by the law of the Province which [only] a few months ago, have entitled the actors unto considerable recompense from the Publick. That tho the [want] of that good Law [warrants] no claims to any such consideration from the publick, yet your petitioner humbly [asserts] that the merit of the action still remains the same; & it seems a matter of universal desire thro the whole Province that it should not pass unrecompensed... Your Petitioner, Thomas Durstun"

On June 16, 1697, the Massachusetts General Court voted to give them a reward for killing their captors; Hannah Duston received 25 pounds, and Neff and Lennardson split another 25 pounds:

"Vote for allowing fifty pounds to Thomas Dustun in behalf of his wife Hannah, and to Mary Neff, and Samuel Leonardson, captives escaped from the Indians, for their service in slaying their captors. Voted, in concurrence with the representatives, that there be allowed and ordered, out of the public treasury, unto Thomas Dunston of Haverhill, on behalf of Hannah his wife, the sum of twenty-five pounds; to Mary Neffe, the sum of twelve pounds ten shillings; and to Samuel Leonardson, the sum of twelve pounds ten shillings...as a reward for their service."

=== Later life ===
Following her return, Hannah gave birth to a second daughter, Lydia, on October 4, 1698. Her neighbor Hannah Heath Bradley, who had also been abducted in the 1697 raid (and two of her children killed), was held for nearly two years before she was ransomed, returning to Haverhill in 1699. During Queen Anne's War Indians raided Haverhill again in 1704 and 1707. In yet another raid on Haverhill (1708), Algonquin and Abenaki Indians led by the French officer Jean-Baptiste Hertel de Rouville killed sixteen, including the town's minister.

Although she claimed to have been baptized as a child, Hannah rarely attended church and did not take communion until late in life, for reasons that are unclear. In May 1724 she asked to be formally admitted to the Haverhill Center Congregational Church. Her husband had made a similar petition in January of that year.

Following her husband's death (between 1724 and 1732) Hannah Duston is believed to have lived with her son Jonathan on his farm in southwest Haverhill. She probably died between 1736 and 1738, (Note: Harold Dustin Kilgore lists her date of death as 6 March 1736, adding that her will was proven in Ipswich on 10 March 1736 and recorded in Salem Registry of Essex Probate.) and was most likely buried near Jonathan Duston's home.

Samuel Lennardson moved to Preston, Connecticut, to join his father. He married and had five children and died on May 11, 1718. Mary Neff died in Haverhill on October 17, 1722. In 1739 Mary Neff's son Joseph was granted two hundred acres of land at Penacook by the General Court of New Hampshire "in consideration of his mother's services in assisting Hannah Duston in killing divers Indians."

== Legacy ==
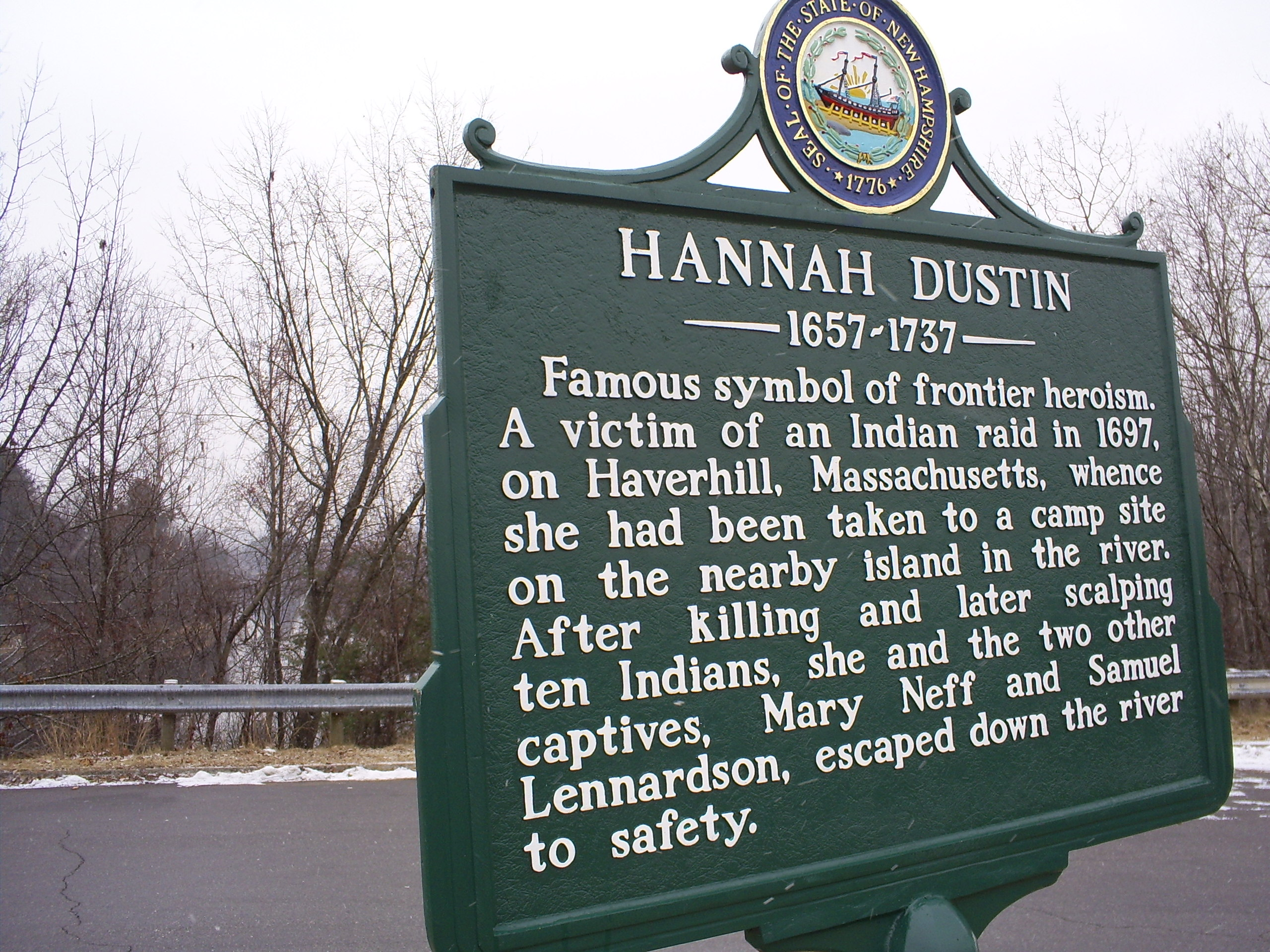
New Hampshire historical marker (number 49) in Boscawen

=== Written accounts ===
==== Contemporary accounts ====
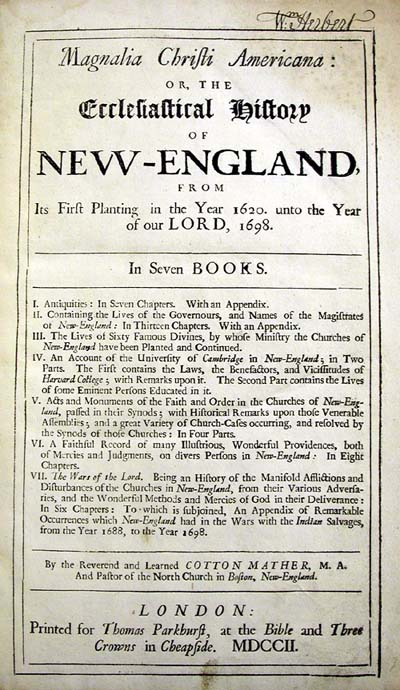
Title page of Cotton Mather's Magnalia Christi Americana (1702) in which he published Hannah Duston's narrative.

The event became well known, due in part to Cotton Mather's account in Magnalia Christi Americana: The Ecclesiastical History of New England (1702). Mather interviewed Hannah after her return to Haverhill, and on May 6, 1697, he preached a sermon celebrating her return from captivity, with Hannah herself in the audience. He later published the story three times in five years: in Humiliations follow'd with Deliverances (1697), Decennium Luctuosum (1699), and in Magnalia Christi Americana (1702). Mather titled the story "A Notable Exploit: Dux Faemina Facti," (Latin: "The leader of this deed/exploit was a woman") and compared Hannah Duston's story to the murder of Sisera by Jael in the Old Testament, and to the captivity narratives of Hannah Swarton (captured in 1690) and Mary Rowlandson (captured in 1675). Captivity narratives featuring women were often used as metaphors for the identity struggle evolving in New England at that time, wherein submissive, humble and obedient Puritan women fought to regain their freedom from the oppression of their Indian captors, in the same way that during the American revolution, the long-suffering colonists resisted the oppressive governance by the British crown.

Hannah's story also appears in the diary of Samuel Sewall, who had heard the story directly from her on May 12, 1697, less than two weeks after her escape. Sewall's account adds the detail that the night before their escape, one of their male captors showed Samuel Lennardson how to take a scalp:

"April 29...is signalized by the achievement of Hannah Dustun, Mary Neff, and Samuel Lennerson, who killed two men, their masters, and two women and six others, and have brought in ten scalps...May 12:...Hannah Dustan came to see us; . . . She said her master, whom she kill'd did formerly live with Mr. Roulandson at Lancaster...The single man shewed the night before, to Saml Lenarson, how he used to knock Englishmen on the head and take off their Scalps; little thinking that the Captives would make some of their first experiment upon himself. Sam. Lenarson kill'd him."

Hannah's story is recorded in the diary of John Marshall (1634–1732), a bricklayer in Quincy, Massachusetts, who wrote the following entry for April 29, 1697:

"At the latter end of this month two women and a young lad that had been taken captive from Haverhill in March before, watching their opportunity when the Indians were asleep, killed ten of them, scalped them all and came home to Boston. [They] brought a gun with them and some other things. The chief of these Indians took one of the women captive when she had lain in childbed but a few days, and knocked her child in [the] head before her eyes, which woman killed and scalped that very Indian."

Another reference to Hannah Duston is found in the journal of John Pike (1634–1714, son of New Jersey judge John Pike), in the following entry:

"March 15: The Indians fell upon some part of Haverhill, about 7 in the morning, killed and carried away 39 or 40 persons -- two of these Captive women, viz. Dunstan & Neff (with another young man), slew ten of the Indians & returned home w[i]th ye scalps."

Although Hannah herself never provided a written account of her captivity and escape (there is no evidence that she was literate), the Haverhill Historical Society possesses a letter dated May 17, 1724, addressed to the elders of the church, declaring her desire to be admitted as a full member of the church so that she might take communion with the other congregants, and offering a confession. (Note: H. D. Kilgore says the letter was found "behind an old gallery pew" in the Center Congregational Church of Haverhill in March of 1929; another source says it was found in a church vault, and others state that it was given to the Haverhill Historical Society in 1909.) It seems likely to have been composed from dictation by her minister. In reference to her captivity, the letter states simply:

"I am Thankful for my Captivity, twas the Comfortablest time that ever I had; In my Affliction God made his Word Comfortable to me."

==== Later renditions ====
After Cotton Mather's death, Hannah Duston's story was largely forgotten until it was included in “Travels in New England and New York” by historian Timothy Dwight IV, published in 1821. After this, Duston became more famous in the 19th century as her story was retold by authors like Nathaniel Hawthorne, John Greenleaf Whittier, and Henry David Thoreau. Thoreau's version adheres to information provided in primary sources, whereas Whittier describes her "thirst of revenge...an insatiate longing for blood. An instantaneous change had been wrought in her very nature; the angel had become a demon, —and she followed her captors, with a stern determination to embrace the earliest opportunity for a bloody retribution." Hawthorne, clearly horrified, pauses in his retelling to exclaim: "But, Oh the children! Their skins are red; yet spare them, Hannah Duston, spare those seven little ones, for the sake of the seven that have fed at your own breast."

Duston's story entered popular imagination along with other tales of violence perpetrated by women, sold as cheap works of short fiction or portrayed on stage in productions intended to appeal to working-class crowds. The rebellion was illustrated in theatrical style in Junius Brutus Stearns' historical painting, Hannah Duston Killing the Indians (1847) in which Stearns, for reasons that remain unclear, depicted Samuel Lennardson as a woman. The Indian children Duston killed are omitted. A second painting, showing Hannah's husband fleeing with her children, is now lost. Violent revenge against American Indians was another popular subject of literature and theater, as in Robert Montgomery Bird's 1837 novel Nick of the Woods.

From the 1820s until the 1870s, Duston's story was included in nearly all books about US history, as well as many biographies, children's books, and magazine articles. The story was popular among white Americans when the country was engaged in the westward expansion, which increased conflict with the American Indian tribes living in places where American settlers wanted to live.

Later versions of the story added numerous details (including dialogue and the names of the Indians) not found in any primary source, as in Robert Boody Caverly's Heroism of Hannah Duston (1875). Haverhill tradition, recorded in Mirick's History of Haverhill (1832), adds the details that Hannah was wearing only one shoe when she was captured, that her daughter was thrown against an apple tree from which local people remembered eating fruit, and that the captives had already started down the river when Hannah insisted that they return to take the Indian scalps.

=== Memorials ===
There are eight memorials that were or are dedicated to Hannah Duston and the other captives that were with her.

==== Aborted first memorial (erected 1861–1865) ====
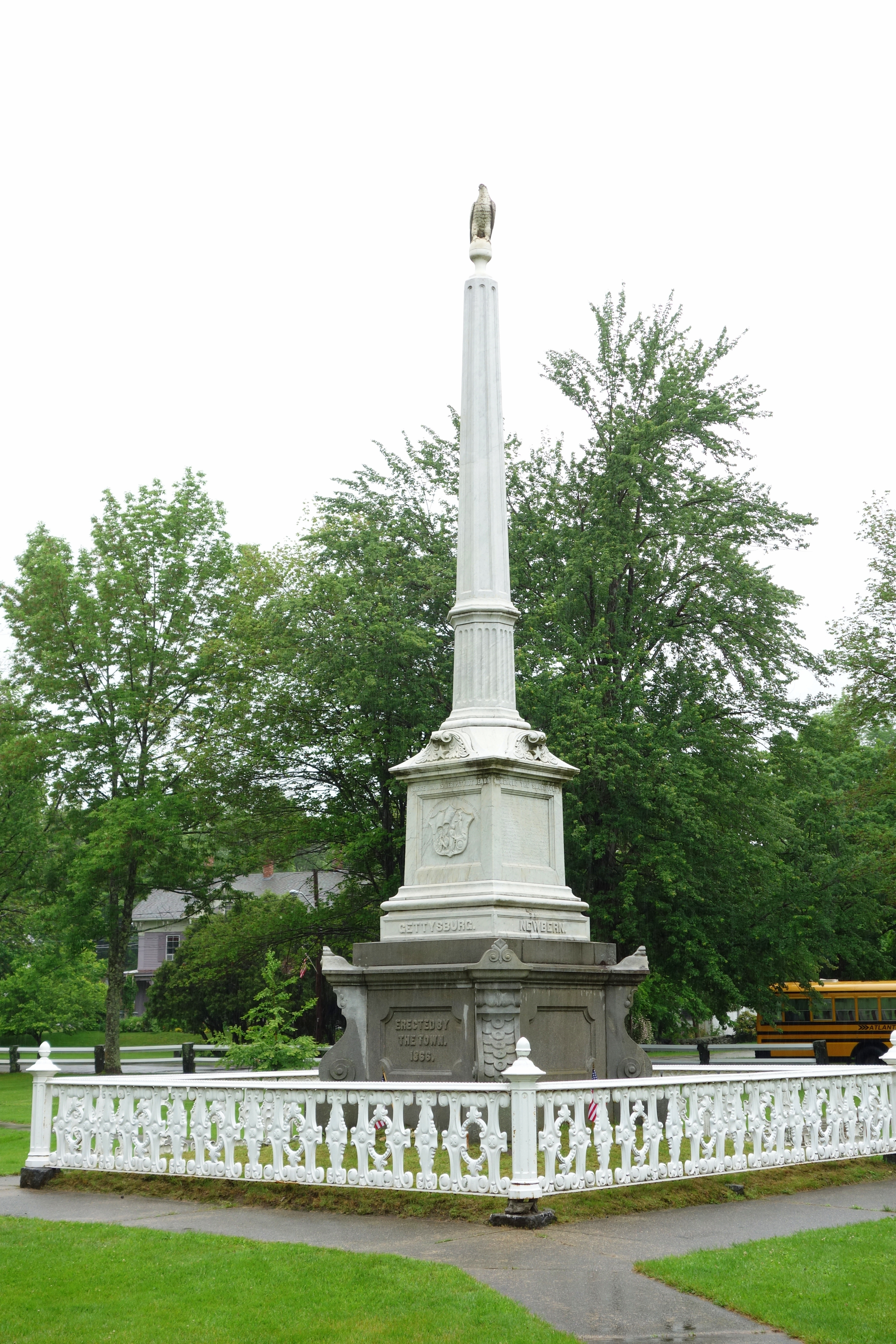
The original monument to Hannah Duston, which was later removed and converted into a monument dedicated to the Civil War soldiers of Barre, Massachusetts.

The campaign to build the first monument in Haverhill, Massachusetts, began in 1852, at a time when building public monuments was still a somewhat rare occurrence. The monument chosen was a simple marble column that would cost about $1,350, and by 1861 the necessary funds had been raised. On its base was a shield, surrounded by a musket, bow, arrows, tomahawk, and scalping knife. Engravings on its sides told the story of the "barbarous" murder of Duston's baby and her "remarkable exploit;" the column was topped by an eagle. The monument was erected on June 1, 1861, at the site of Duston's capture, but it was never fully paid for. Some subscribers were upset that the monument was in the middle of farmland on the outskirts of town instead of Haverhill Common. After successfully suing the association, the builders quietly removed the monument in August 1865, erased the inscription, engraved a new one, and resold it to the town of Barre, Massachusetts, where it stands to this day as a memorial to that town's Civil War soldiers.

==== First successful memorial (erected 1874) ====
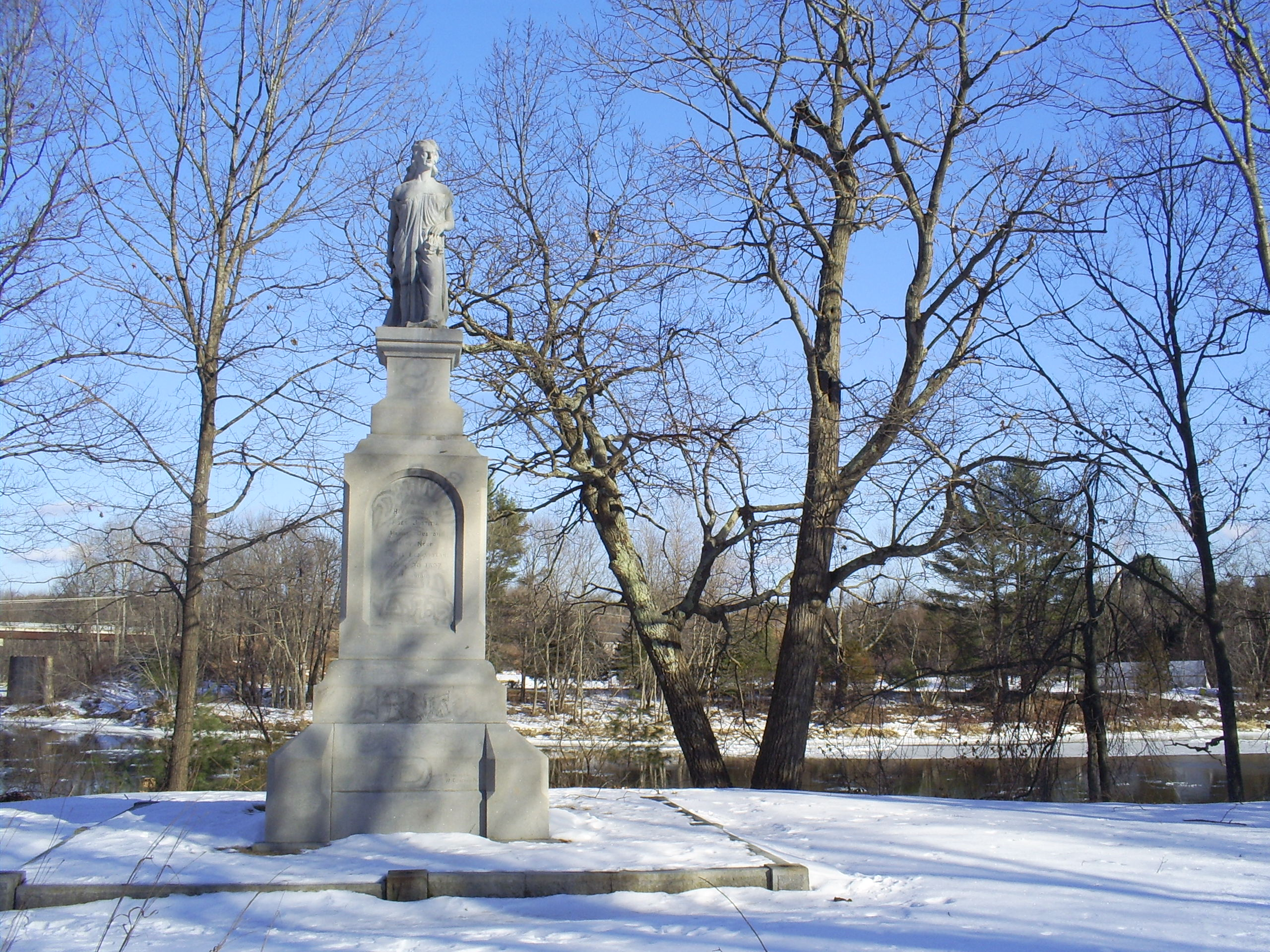
Statue on the island in Boscawen, New Hampshire, where Hannah killed her captors and escaped down the river.

Now known as the Hannah Duston Memorial State Historic Site, the first Duston memorial actually executed was sculpted by William Andrews (1836–1927), a marble worker from Lowell, Massachusetts. An attorney named Robert Boody Caverly, author of The Heroism of Hannah Duston, Together with the Indian Wars of New England (1875), raised $6,000 from 450 subscribers to erect the 35-foot-tall statue depicting Hannah with a hatchet in one hand and ten scalps in the other. It was dedicated on June 17, 1874, on the island in Boscawen, New Hampshire, where Duston killed her captors. An inscription on the east side reads:

The war whoop, tomahawk, faggot & infanticides were at Haverhill
The ashes of wigwam-camp-fires at night & of ten of the tribe are here.

A crowd of almost five thousand people overwhelmed the island on the day of its dedication, with speeches presented all day long, culminating with a dedication by New Hampshire Governor James A. Weston. It was the first publicly funded statue in New Hampshire and the first statue in the US to honor an American woman.

Local members of the Cowasuck Band of the Pennacook Abenaki People have proposed adding another statue to the island park to honor fallen Abenaki, in order to "tell a more complete story about New England's indigenous peoples." They also want to erect plaques with historical information on the Merrimack and Contoocook rivers and the old railroad track that runs across to the island.

==== Second memorial (erected 1879) ====
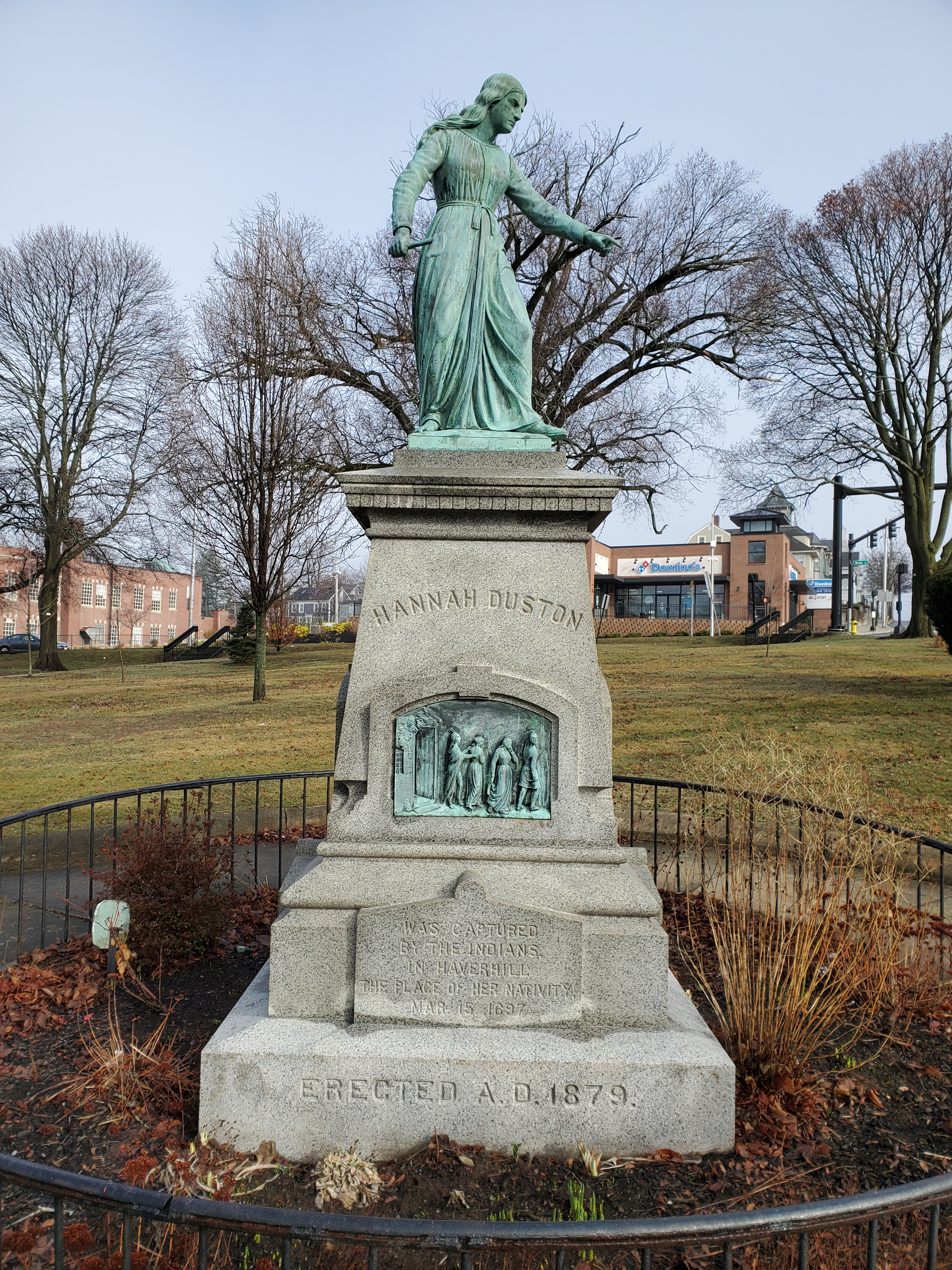
Hannah Duston Monument, by Calvin H. Weeks, 1879

In 1879, a bronze statue of Hannah Duston grasping a hatchet was created by Calvin H. Weeks (1834–1907) in Haverhill town square (now Grand Army Park), where it still stands on the site of the Haverhill Center Congregational Church, of which Hannah Duston became a member in 1724. It depicts Hannah wearing only one shoe, per Haverhill tradition.

Over the years, the statue has been repeatedly vandalized, including twice by gunshots to the face. On October 31, 1934, the statue's hatchet was stolen, but it was later recovered and welded back into place. On May 6, 2020, the monument was defaced with splashes of red paint. On July 10, 2020, the words "Haverhill's own monument to genocide" were found written on the statue's base in pink chalk. The statue was vandalized again on August 28, 2020, with splashes of red paint. On Thanksgiving Day, 2021, the statue was again vandalized with either red spray-paint or with splashes of red paint. To prevent further vandalism, city workers draped the statue in a blue plastic tarp, pending cleaning by the highway department.

Some local residents have proposed that the statue should be removed because it promotes harmful stereotypes of warlike Indians. A city council subcommittee was assigned to consider the possibility of moving the statue to another location after a period of public discussion. It has been suggested that the statue be moved to the Buttonwoods Museum or to the Dustin Garrison house, but these institutions indicated they were afraid that this would attract even more vandalism. In April, after several public meetings to consider moving the statue to a less conspicuous site, the City Council voted unanimously not to move it, and to provide space for a memorial honoring Indigenous peoples. Haverhill mayor James Fiorentini subsequently established the Native American Commemorative Task Force to examine the history and culture of the Native peoples of the Haverhill region, and to recommend ways in which the community might honor them.

In May, 2021, the city decided to keep the statue but alter some of the offensive language on the base, remove the hatchet and provide space in the park for a Native American monument, including a memorial to Duston's victims and information about Abenaki history. An additional debate is ongoing, over whether the name of the park should be changed. One proposal calls for renaming the New Hampshire site "Unity Park N'dakinna," which means "our land" in Abenaki.

==== Third memorial (1902) ====
In 1902 a third memorial was placed by the Daughters of the American Revolution on a small plot of land at Allds and Fifield streets in Nashua, New Hampshire, at the site of John Lovewell's home (part of Dunstable, New Hampshire, in Lovewell's time), where Hannah, Mary, and Samuel spent the night on their way home from captivity. The stone marker's inscription reads:

"On this point of land dwelt John Lovewell, one of the earliest settlers of Dunstable at whose house Hannah Duston spent the night after her escape from the Indians at Penacook Island March 30, 1697. Erected by Matthew Thornton Chapter, DAR 1902"

==== Fourth memorial (1902) ====
In December 1902 a millstone was placed on the shores of the Merrimack River where Hannah, Mary, and Samuel beached their canoe upon their return to Haverhill.

==== Fifth memorial (inscribed in 1908) ====
The fifth memorial was created in 1908, when an inscription was placed on a boulder in memorial to both Hannah and Martha. The 30-ton glacial erratic rock was pulled out of Bradley Brook where it emptied into the Merrimack, near where Hannah landed her canoe after her escape, and placed on the site of Hannah's son Jonathan's home in Haverhill, where Hannah had lived during her final years. Hannah Duston died at this location circa 1736, 1737 or 1738 and is believed to have been buried nearby. Haverhill public library records say it took 30 horses with 14 drivers to haul the boulder to its present location.

==== Leonardson Memorial (1910) ====
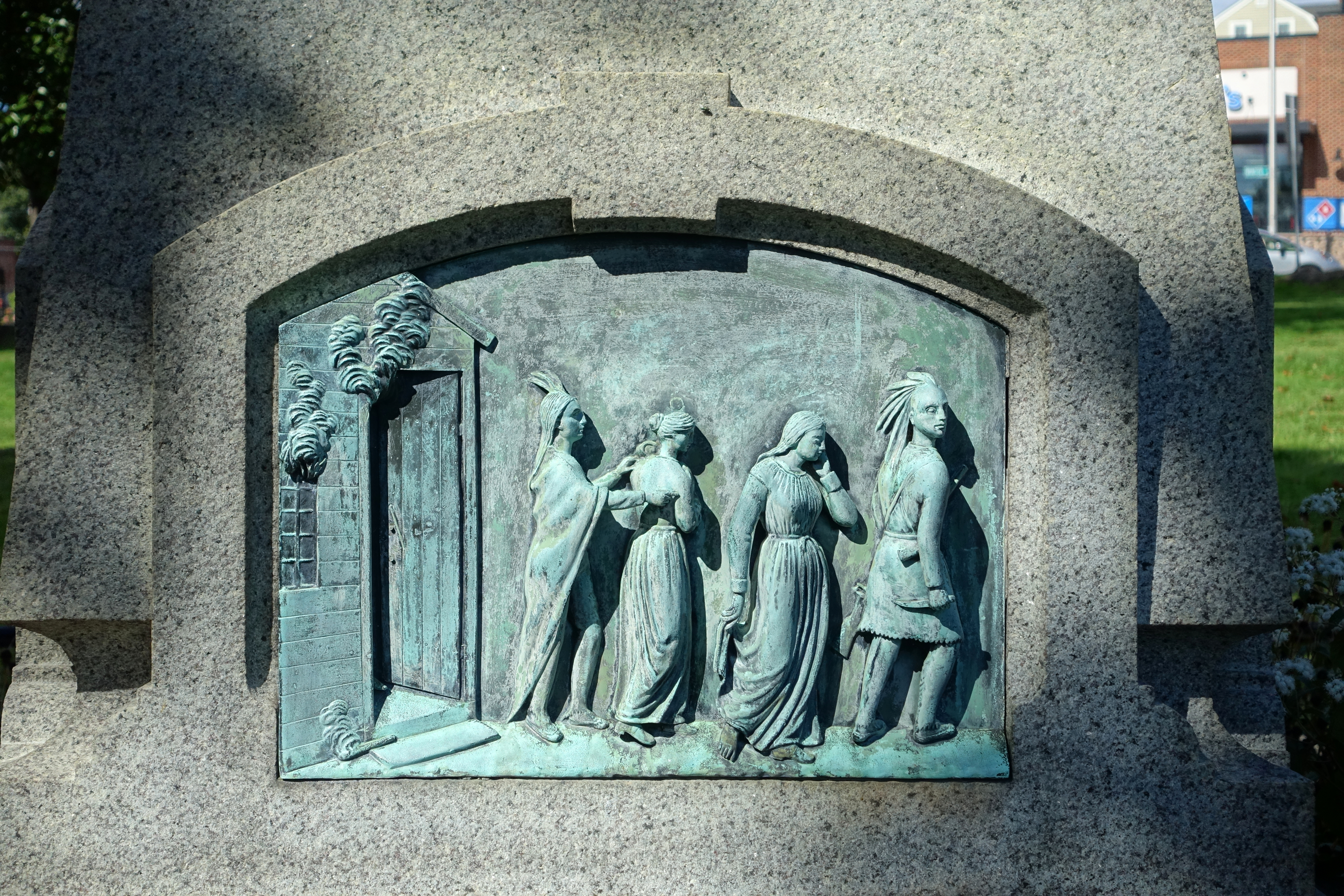
Hannah Duston and Mary Neff being abducted by Indians, as depicted on the base of the Hannah Duston statue by Calvin H. Weeks.

The Worcester Society of Antiquity sponsored the bronze "Lenorson" tablet (using the spelling they considered correct) and dedicated it on October 22, 1910. The Worcester Sunday Telegram reported it was hung on the 42-foot (13 m) Davis Tower at Lake Park in Worcester, at the site of the Lenorson boyhood home on the shore of Lake Quinsigamond. It was reported stolen in 1969, just before the tower was demolished, and has not been recovered.

==== Mount Dustan ====
Mount Dustan in Wentworth Location, New Hampshire, was named after Hannah Duston sometime before 1870, using an alternate spelling of her last name.

=== Duston hatchet ===
The original small axe or hatchet held by Hannah Duston can be found today in the Buttonwoods Museum. The Duston hatchet is not a tomahawk; it is usually called a Biscayan or biscayenne, a common trade item of the late 17th-century New England frontier. It is on display with the knife she allegedly used to scalp her captors, along with her letter of confession petitioning to join the Center Congregational Church of Haverhill.

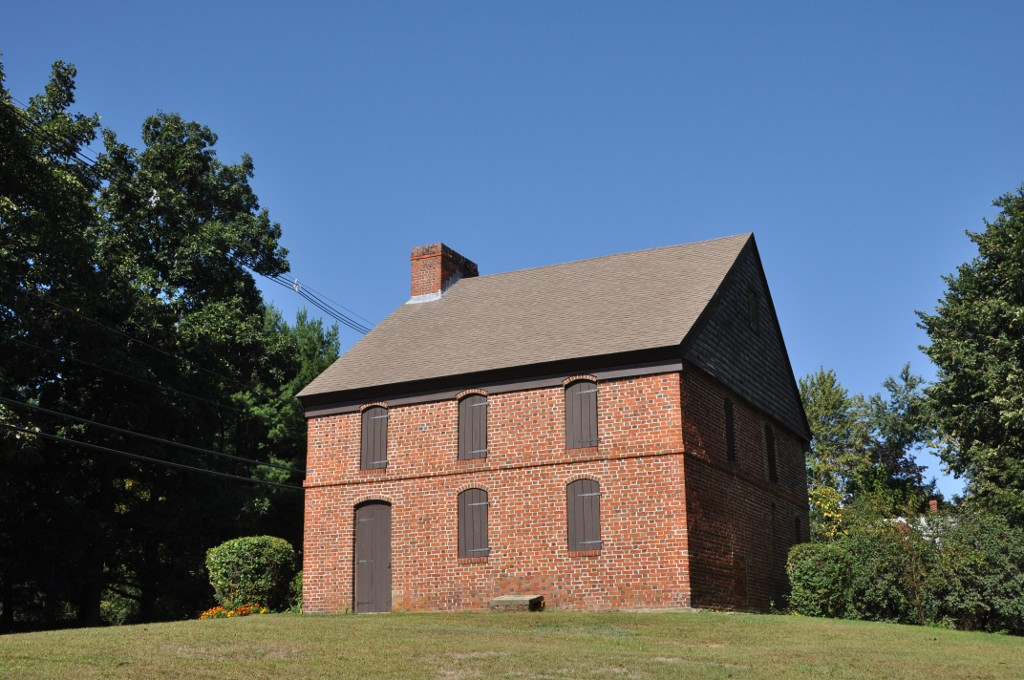
The Dustin House or Dustin Garrison House, built about in 1700, is a historic First Period house at 665 Hilldale Avenue in Haverhill, Massachusetts.

=== Commemorative structures ===
Other commemorations, all in the city of Haverhill, include:

- Dustin House, which Hannah's husband Thomas Duston was building at the time of the 1697 raid, was completed in the 1700 and is listed on the U.S. National Register of Historic Places.
- Haverhill Elementary school was renamed Hannah Dustin Elementary School on July 10, 1911. It closed in the 1980s.
- The Hannah Duston Healthcare Center is located on Monument Street in Haverhill.

== Bibliography ==
- Atkinson, Jay (October 2015). Massacre on the Merrimack: Hannah Duston's Captivity and Revenge in Colonial America. 2015, 2017: Lyons Press. ISBN 9781493018178.
- Caverly, Robert Boodey (1990). Heroism of Hannah Duston: Together with the Indian Wars of New England. Bowie, Md.: Heritage Books. ISBN 978-1-55613-301-5.
- Martino, Gina M. (2018). Women at War in the Borderlands of the Early American Northeast. Chapel Hill: University of North Carolina Press. ISBN 978-1469640990.
- Mather, Cotton (1702). Magnalia Christi Americana: Or the Ecclesiastical History of New England from 1620–1698.
- Namias, June (1993). White Captives: Gender and Ethnicity on the American Frontier. Chapel Hill: University of North Carolina Press. ISBN 978-0-8078-2079-7.
- American Captivity Narratives: Selected Narratives with Introduction. New Riverside editions. Gordon M. Sayre (ed.). Boston: Houghton Mifflin. 2000. ISBN 978-0-395-98073-6.
- Weis, Ann-Marie (1998). "The Murderous Mother and the Solicitous Father: Violence, Jacksonian Family Values, and Hannah Duston's Captivity". American Studies International. 36 (1): 46–65. JSTOR 41279557.
- Humphreys, Sara (2011). "The Mass Marketing of the Colonial Captive Hannah Duston". Canadian Review of American Studies. 41 (2): 149–178. doi:10.1353/crv.2011.0014. ISSN 1710-114X. S2CID 162298574.
