= New England Puritan culture and recreation =

Recreation in colonial New England

The Puritan culture of the New England colonies of the seventeenth century was influenced by Calvinist theology, which believed in a "just, almighty God," and a lifestyle of pious, consecrated actions. The Puritans participated in their own forms of recreational activity, including visual arts, literature, and music.

== Literature ==
Puritans placed a high value upon personal Bible study and consequently highly valued literacy. They produced a significant collection of literature themselves in three main genres: sermons, diaries, and poetry.

=== Sermons ===
Puritan ministers most commonly used exegesis to preach on passages of scripture, meaning they strove to base their beliefs and theology directly on the Bible. Their sermons were extensively prepared and memorized, and lasted for roughly an hour in length. Some prominent leaders whose sermons are still extant include Cotton Mather, John Davenport, and Jonathan Edwards.

=== Diaries ===
The Puritans used personal diaries to record the ways in which God was present in their lives and their personal struggles carrying out His purposes. Some Puritans wrote from those personal records to provide accounts of events, with an emphasis on God's intervention in human affairs. William Bradford wrote of the occurrences surrounding the Puritans' arrival at the Americas in Of Plymouth Plantation. Rather than a historical retelling of events, other Puritans kept and published diaries in which they reflected on God's involvement in their own lives.

=== Poetry ===
Puritans were not well known for their poetry. Edward Taylor wrote his own poetry in preparation for weekly Sunday sermons. Taylor spent extensive amounts of time pondering and searching the scriptures to appropriately relay the necessary doctrine to his congregation; in preparation, he wrote poetry correlating to the doctrine he chose to teach. His poetry demonstrates deep compassion and submission to the Lord on a very personal level. Some of Taylor's poetry includes "Psalm Two", "Huswifery", "Upon a Wasp Chilled with Cold", and "Meditation 26".

In addition to the preparation poetry seen by Edward Taylor, the Puritan woman Anne Bradstreet wrote dense poetry of her own. She spoke in a deeply personal manner distant from the general understanding of the role of Puritan women. She used poetry as a mode of demonstrating her love for family, husband, and God. Her poems include "The Prologue", "To My Dear and Loving Husband", and "Contemplations".

== Music ==
By way of musical instruments, the Puritans avoided all use of such materials in the church services; however, according to historians they appreciated the sound of "lutes, violins, trumpets, flutes, virginals, and other instruments." In his book America's Music, Gilbert Chase writes: "In 1716, an advertisement in the Boston News announced the arrival of a shipment of instruments from London, consisting of 'flageolets, flutes, haut-boys, bass-viols, violins, bows, strings, reeds for haunt-boys, books of instruction for all these instruments, books of ruled paper. To be sold at the dancing school of Mr. Enstone in Sudbury Street near the Orange Tree, Boston.' So by this time Boston had a fully equipped music store, and located in a dancing school at that!"

=== Psalm books ===
The usage of music in Puritan religious meetings developed and evolved over time. According to the anthology America's Musical Life by Dr. Richard Crawford, up until the late 16th century, the Puritans picked up the use of The Whole Bookie of Psalmed, Collected into Englisher Meter as hymns to complement the sermons. These hymns from the Old Version of the psalm hymns put the words of the Old Testament psalms into musical meters that allowed the Puritans to sing the scriptures, which was considered as service to the Lord, not an art form at this point. When this sort of "psalm singing" was brought to the Americas, general historians believe it provided a basis for an "indigenous musical life" for the New World.

In the late sixteenth century, a new psalm book by the name of The Whole Booke of Psalmes Faithfully Translated into English Meter was published which rearranged the words of the psalms to more aesthetically pleasing meters and tunes. With this new psalm book came a new method of singing, called "singing by note" which called for a lead singer and familiar melodies, both of which made the practice of congregational singing more individualized and personable. This alteration caused contention among the Puritans because the new hymn book broke from the Puritan societal norms. It began the transformation of the church practices within the Puritan lifestyle for the purpose of enhancing musical ability.

== Visual arts ==
There was no Puritan view against beauty in the arts, and therefore no objection to visual fineries; however, the pragmatism intrinsic to the Puritan mindset limited the amount of art produced in the Americas. The practical activities of life generally outweighed any sort of extravagance in the Puritan community. Aside from embellishments on buildings and small decorations in the home, however, paintings also surfaced during the era that the Puritans occupied the land. The Freake paintings by the Freake-Gibbs painter as well as Captain Thomas Smith's self-portrait each represent a Puritan and therefore show Puritan involvement in blatantly visual arts. Aside from the rare paintings as mentioned above, Puritan women created handicrafts and also enjoyed sewing and creating fine fabrics.

== Physical activity ==
There is very little documentation of any sort of sports in general Puritan lifestyle. The Puritan doctrine advocated a life intent on avoiding idle action. The Puritans placed significant emphasis on the value of work and saw it as a duty to the Lord as his chosen people to spend all time productively. Distraction from this lifestyle was seen as a vice. Sport was often considered a form of leisurely or idle activity, and therefore a vice. This prevented sport from flourishing among Puritans in the Thirteen Colonies.

Despite the general understanding of sport to be contrary to the work of the righteous, the Puritan doctrine of uniting the spirit and the body in a collective health was advocated by William Burkitt, a Puritan theologist, as well as by other Puritan leaders. Burkitt refers to "lawful recreation" as "both needful and expedient" in the perfecting of the people. Scholars recorded in the Stadion journal that as Puritan theology evolved, its understanding of the body shifted from an inherently sinful entity to a "neutral" quality of life. The Puritans, therefore, sought a productive and consecrated use of the body. This understanding of the body allowed for greater interpretation concerning what was appropriate and what was not. Organized game was rarely established within the Puritan lifestyle; however, according to various historians, physical activity was prevalent in Puritan New England by way of manual labor.

== See also ==
- Christmas in Puritan New England
- Women in 17th-century New England

== Sources ==
- Baym, N., ed. (2007). Beginnings to 1820. Vol. A. New York: W. W. Norton & Company. ISBN 9780393927399.
- Brailsford, D. (1975). "Puritanism and sport in seventeenth century England". Stadion: Zeitschrift für Geschichte des Sports und der Korperkultur. 1 (2): 316–330.
- Bremer, F. (1976). The puritan experiment: New England society from Bradford to Edwards. New York: St. Martin's Press. OCLC 422685942.
- Coffey, J.; Lim, P., eds. (2008). Cambridge Companion to Puritanism. Cambridge University Press. ISBN 9781139001960.
- Chase, G. (1955). America's Music: from the Pilgrims to the Present. New York: McGraw-Hill. OCLC 936010738.
- Colacurcio, M. (1984). The province of piety: moral history in Hawthorne's early tales. Cambridge: Harvard University Press. ISBN 9780674719576.
- Crawford, R., ed. (2005). America's Musical Life: A History. New York: W. W. Norton & Company. ISBN 9780393327267.
- Daniels, B.C. (1991). "Did the puritans have fun? Leisure, recreation and the concept of pleasure in early new England". Journal of American Studies, 25(1): 7–22.
- Daniels, B.C. (1993). "Frolics for fun: Dances, weddings, and dinner parties in colonial new England". Historical Journal of Massachusetts, 21(2): 1–22.
- Howard, L. (1986). Essays on puritans and puritanism. Albuquerque: University of New Mexico Press.
- Jable, J.T. (1976). "The English puritans – suppressors of sport and amusement?" Canadian Journal of History of Sport & Physical Education, 7(1): 33–40.
- Johnston, A.F. (1991). "English puritanism and festive custom". Renaissance & Reformation/Renaissance Et Reforme, 15(4): 289–297.
- Miller, P. (1939). The new England mind: The seventeenth century. New York: Macmillan.
- Puritanism: Opposing viewpoints (1994). San Diego: Greenhaven Press.
- Scheucking, L.L. (1970; 1969). The puritan family: A social study from the literary sources. New York: Schocken Books.
- Wagner, P. (1976). "Literary evidence of sport in colonial new England: The American puritan jeremiad". Stadion, 2(2): 233–249.
- Wagner, P. (1976). "Puritan attitudes toward physical recreation in 17th century new England." Journal of Sport History, 3(2), 139–151.
- Wagner, P. (1977). "American puritan literature: A neglected field of research in American sport history". Canadian Journal of History of Sport & Physical Education, 8(2): 62–75.
