= Christopher Sandford (biographer) =

English journalist and biographer

Christopher Sandford (born 1 July 1956) is an English journalist and biographer. He primarily writes about film and music, as well as cricket, his sport of preference.

== Life and career ==
Sandford was born in England, the son of Sefton Sandford, a senior British naval officer. He spent his childhood partly in the Soviet Union, where his father served as senior military attaché in the British Embassy, and partly in the United Kingdom. He was educated at Radley College and Fitzwilliam College, Cambridge, where he obtained a master's degree in history in 1977. He began his career as a journalist in London that same year.

Sandford lives in Seattle and London. Apart from his biographies, histories, novels and other books, he has written prolifically for newspapers and magazines in the US and the UK. His book The Final Innings: The Cricketers of Summer 1939 was joint winner of The Cricket Society/MCC Book of the Year award for 2020. Of The Final Innings, Alex Massie said in Wisden that "Sandford captures the shadows lengthening over cricket – and everything else – in late-1930s England."

== Books ==
- The Cornhill Centenary Test 1981
- Feasting with Panthers 1983 (novel)
- Arcadian 1985 (novel)
- We Don't Do Dogs 1988 (novel)
- Godfrey Evans: A Biography 1990
- Tom Graveney: The Biography 1992
- Mick Jagger: Primitive Cool 1994
- Bowie: Loving the Alien 1998
- Sting: Demolition Man 1998
- Springsteen: Point Blank 1999
- Clapton: Edge of Darkness 1999
- McQueen: The Biography 2001
- Keith Richards: Satisfaction 2004
- Paul McCartney 2006
- Imran Khan: The Cricketer, the Celebrity, the Politician 2009
- Polanski: A Biography 2009
- Masters of Mystery: The Strange Friendship of Arthur Conan Doyle and Harry Houdini 2011
- The Rolling Stones: Fifty Years 2012
- Kurt Cobain 2013
- The Final Over: The Cricketers of Summer 1914 2015
- Harold and Jack: The Remarkable Friendship of Prime Minister Macmillan and President Kennedy 2015
- Mick Jagger: Rebel Knight 2016
- The Man Who Would Be Sherlock: The Real Life Adventures of Arthur Conan Doyle 2017
- Union Jack: John F. Kennedy's Special Relationship with Great Britain 2018
- Zeebrugge: The Greatest Raid of All 2018
- The Final Innings: The Cricketers of Summer 1939 2019
- Keeper of Style: John Murray: The King of Lord's 2019
- Victor Lustig: The Man Who Conned the World 2021
- Laker and Lock: The Story of Cricket's "Spin Twins" 2022
- 1964: The Year the Swinging Sixties Began 2024
- The Cricketers of 1945: Rising from the Ashes of World War Two 2024
- 1976: The Year that Scorched 2025
