= Dustin House =

Historic house in Massachusetts, United States

- Dustin-Duston Garrison House
- U.S. National Register of Historic Places
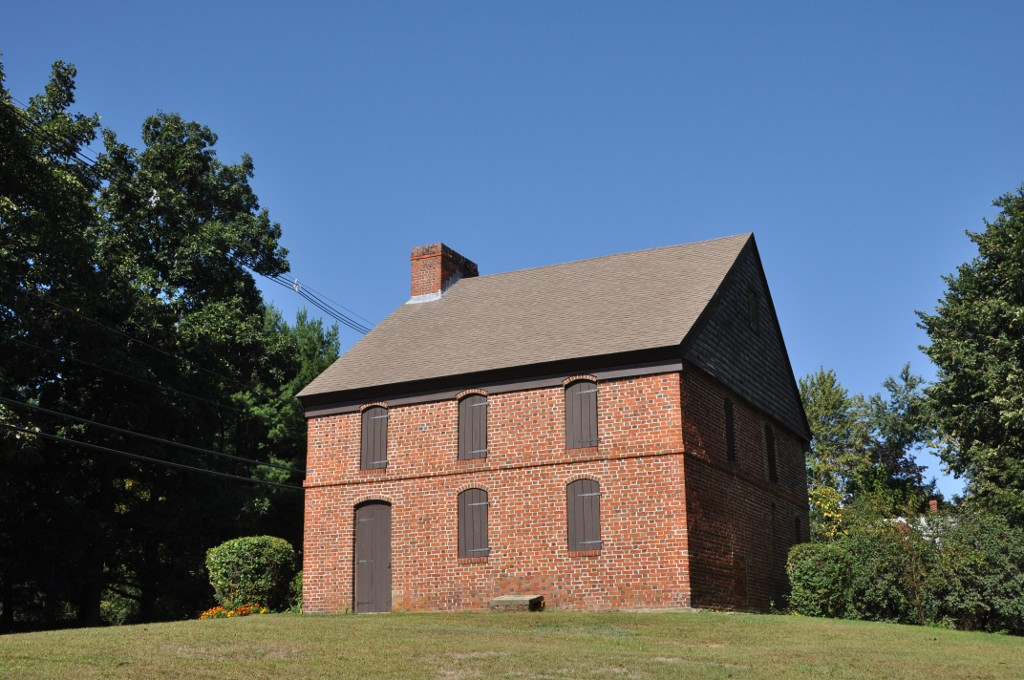

- Location within Massachusetts Location within the United States
- Location: 665 Hilldale Ave., Haverhill, Massachusetts
- Coordinates: 42°47′47″N 71°6′41″W
- Built: c. 1697–78
- Architectural style: Colonial
- MPS: First Period Buildings of Eastern Massachusetts TR
- NRHP reference No.: 90000227
- Added to NRHP: March 9, 1990

The Dustin-Duston Garrison House or Dustin House is a historic First Period house in Haverhill, Massachusetts, United States. Built about 1700, it is one of a very small number of surviving period houses built out of brick in Massachusetts. It is also notable for its association with the Dustin or Duston family; Hannah Duston was famously captured by Native Americans during a 1697 attack on Haverhill, probably while this house was under construction. The house was added to the National Register of Historic Places in 1990.

== Description and history ==
The Dustin House stands in what is now a rural-residential area of northern Haverhill, on the east side of Hilldale Avenue opposite a golf course. It is set on a rise facing south. It is a 2 1/2-story brick building, with a gabled roof and single end chimney. The main facade is three bays wide, with the entrance set in the leftmost bay. The brick on the facade and east side is laid in Flemish bond, with short-end bricks highlighted by their blackened ends. Window and door openings are topped by segmented arches, and there is a stringcourse of corbelled brickwork between the first and second floors. The brick exhibits patching in a number of places, where openings were once made but afterwards closed during restoration.

The house is believed to have been under construction by farmer and brick-maker Thomas Duston at the time of the 1697 attack on Haverhill during King William's War. It was during this raid that his wife, Hannah Duston, in bed at their existing home a half mile away, was captured by Native Americans. Cotton Mather later wrote a popular captivity narrative about her experience.

Deed research however, suggests that the Dustins never occupied this house, and that it was probably built for the Kimball family. The house is one of a very small number of brick houses in eastern Massachusetts from the First Period of colonial architecture, and consequently provides an important window into masonry techniques of the period. Its form is also unusual for northeastern Massachusetts, and more closely resembles the stone-enders of early Rhode Island. The building underwent a major restoration in 1946 after its acquisition by a Dustin family association.

The house is now owned and governed by the Dustin-Duston Garrison House Association. The house opens periodically for tours during the summer and fall.

== See also ==
- National Register of Historic Places listings in Essex County, Massachusetts
