= Raid on Haverhill (1697) =

Military engagement during King William's War

- Part of King William's War
Date	March 15, 1697
Location	Haverhill, Province of Massachusetts Bay
Result	French and native victory

Belligerents
Massachusetts Bay	New France; Algonquin

Commanders and leaders
	Chief Nescambious

Strength
	Approximately 20

Casualties and losses
27 colonists killed 13 captured	Unknown

The Raid on Haverhill was a military engagement that took place on March 15, 1697 during King William's War. Ordered by Louis de Buade de Frontenac, Governor General of New France, French, Algonquin, and Abenaki warriors descended on Haverhill, then a small frontier community in the Province of Massachusetts Bay. In the surprise attack, the Abenaki killed 27 colonists and took 13 captive. The natives burned six homes. The raid became famous in the nineteenth century because of Hannah Dustin's captivity narrative as a result of the raid.

== Afterward ==
The last battle of the war was on September 9, the Battle of Damariscotta, in which Captain John March killed 25 native men.

Even after the war was officially ended, Abenaki raids on the English colonists continued. On March 4, 1698 Pigwacket Abenaki Chief, Escumbuit led a group of 30 Indians in a raid on Andover, Massachusetts, the last and most severe Indian raid on this town. There was also another raid by the Natives of Acadia on Hatfield, Massachusetts in 1688, where they killed two settlers.

== Legacy ==
- Henry David Thoreau A Week on the Concord and Merrimack Rivers (1849)
- Nathaniel Hawthorne "The Duston Family." The American Magazine of Useful and Entertaining Knowledge, (1836)
- John Greenleaf Whittier in his short story "The Mother’s Revenge" (1831)
- Cotton Mather Magnalia Christi Americana (orig. pub. 1702).

== See also ==
- Dustin House
