= Magnalia Christi Americana =

1702 book by the puritan minister Cotton Mather

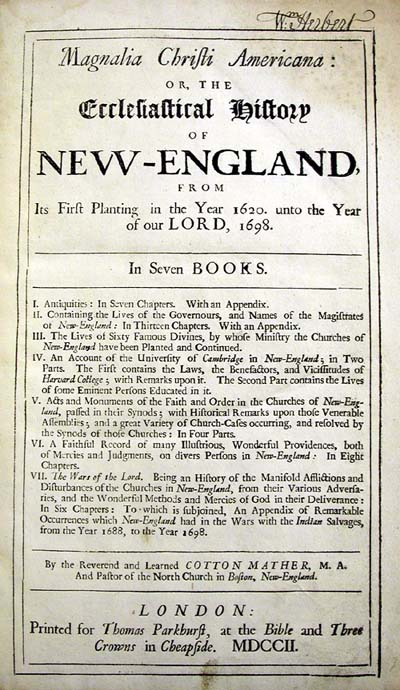
Title page of the book

Magnalia Christi Americana (roughly, The Glorious Works of Christ in America) is a book published in 1702 by the puritan minister Cotton Mather (1663–1728). Its title is in Latin, but its subtitle is in English: The Ecclesiastical History of New England from Its First Planting in 1620, until the Year of Our Lord 1698. It was generally written in English and printed in London "for Thomas Parkhurst, at the Bible and Three Crowns, Cheapside."

== Contents ==
It consists of seven "books" collected into two volumes, and it details the religious development of Massachusetts, and other nearby colonies in New England from 1620 to 1698. Notable parts of the book include Mather's descriptions of the Salem witch trials, in which he criticizes some of the methods of the court and attempts to distance himself from the event; his account of the escape of Hannah Duston, one of the best known captivity narratives; his account of the captivity and ransom of Hannah Swarton; his complete "catalogus" of all the students who graduated from Harvard College, the story of the founding of Harvard College itself; and his assertions that Puritan slaveholders should do more to convert their slaves to Christianity.

== Publication history ==
Mather's first edition of the book was published in London in 1702. A second edition – the first published in the United States – was printed in 1820 in Hartford, Connecticut by Silas Andrus and Son, who also produced a third edition in 1855. Robbins reprinted an edition in 1852 and 1967, which is the only complete reprinting of the first edition. A 1977 reprint of small selections, with extensive footnotes, was produced for Belknap Press by Kenneth Ballard Murdock.

== See also ==
- 1702 in literature
