= Stadion (journal) =

- Discipline: History of sport
- Language: English, French, German
- Edited by: Manfred Lämmer, Thierry Terret, Maureen Smith

Publication details
- Former name(s): International Journal of the History of Sport
- History: 1975–present
- Publisher: Academia Verlag
- Frequency: Biannual

Standard abbreviations
- ISO 4: Stadion

Indexing
- ISSN: 0172-4029
- LCCN: 77645028
- OCLC no.: 643612976

Links
- Journal homepage

Stadion is a multilingual academic journal covering the history of sport. The editors-in-chief are Manfred Lämmer, Thierry Terret, and Maureen Smith (German Sport University Cologne).
