= Skowhegan, Maine =

- Town
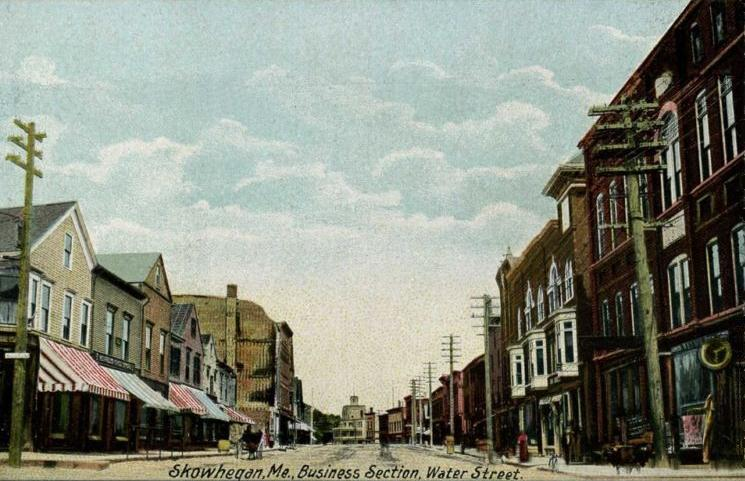
- Water Street in 1906

- Seal
- Motto: A Place to Watch
- Location within Maine Location within the United States
- Coordinates: 44°45′20″N 69°40′00″W
- Country: United States
- State: Maine
- County: Somerset
- Settled: 1771
- Incorporated: February 5, 1823

Area
  - Total: 60.47 sq mi (156.62 km^{2})
  - Land: 58.85 sq mi (152.42 km^{2})
  - Water: 1.62 sq mi (4.20 km^{2})
- Elevation: 112 ft (34 m)

Population (2020)
  - Total: 8,620
  - Density: 163/sq mi (63.1/km^{2})
- Time zone: UTC-05:00 (EST)
  - Summer (DST): UTC-04:00 (EDT)
- ZIP code: 04976
- Area code: 207
- FIPS code: 23-68910
- GNIS ID: 579029
- Website: www.skowhegan.org

Skowhegan (/skaʊˈhiːɡən/) is the county seat of Somerset County, Maine, United States. As of the 2020 census, the town population was 8,620. It contains the census-designated place of the same name. Every August, Skowhegan hosts the annual Skowhegan State Fair, the oldest continuously held state fair in the United States. Skowhegan was originally inhabited by the indigenous Abenaki people who named the area Skowhegan, meaning "watching place [for fish]," and were mostly dispersed by the end of the 4th Anglo-Abenaki War.

== History ==
=== Original inhabitants ===
For thousands of years prior to European settlement, this region of Maine was the territory of the Kinipekw (later known as Kennebec) Norridgewock tribe of Abenaki. The Norridgewock village was located on the land now known as Madison. The Abenaki relied on agriculture (corn, beans, and squash) for a large part of their diet, supplemented by hunting, fishing, and the gathering of wild foods. The Skowhegan Falls (which have since been replaced by the Weston Dam) descended 28 feet over a half-mile on the Kennebec River. From spring until fall the tribe fished here, where abundant salmon and other species could be caught by wading. They speared salmon and other fish in the pools beneath two waterfalls there and utilized the rich land on its banks to raise corn and other crops. This place was an important stop on their annual migrations from northern hunting grounds in winter to coastal Maine in summer. They dried fish on the Island in early summer and planted crops to be harvested on their return northward in autumn. Consequently, they named the area Skowhegan, meaning "watching place [for fish]." Early variant names include Schoogun, Squahegan, Cohegan, Cohigin, Schouhegan, Scohigin, Cohiggin, Scowhegan, Scohegan, Scunkhegon, Squhegan, Sou heagan, Sou Heavyon, etc.

=== Battle of Norridgewock ===
The village's Catholic mission was run by a French Jesuit priest, Father Sébastien Râle. Massachusetts governor Samuel Shute declared war on the Abenaki in 1722. On August 22, 1724, Captains Johnson Harmon, Jeremiah Moulton, and Richard Bourne (Brown) led a force of two hundred rangers to the main Abenaki village on the Kennebec River to kill Father Sébastien Râle and destroy the settlement. The Battle of Norridgewock (also known as the "Norridgewock Raid") took place on August 23, 1724. The land was being fought over by England, France and the Wabanaki Confederacy, during the colonial frontier conflict referred to as Father Rale's War. Despite being called a 'battle' by some, the raid was essentially a massacre of Indians by colonial British troops. The raid was undertaken to check Abenaki power in the region, limit Catholic proselytizing among the Abenaki (and thereby perceived French influence), and to allow the expansion of New England settlements into Abenaki territory and Acadia. Other motivations for the raid included the special £100 scalp bounty placed on Râle's head by the Massachusetts provincial assembly and the bounty on Abenaki scalps offered by the colony during the conflict. Most accounts record about 80 Abenaki being killed. Both English and French accounts agree that the raid was a surprise nighttime attack on a civilian target. Both English and French accounts also report that many of the dead were unarmed when they were killed, and those massacred included many women and children. Lieut. Richard Jaques killed Rale in the opening moments of the battle; the soldiers obscenely mutilated Rale's body and later paraded his scalp through the streets of Boston to redeem their reward for the scalp of Rale with those of the other dead. The Boston authorities gave a reward for the scalps, and Harmon was promoted. The rangers massacred nearly two dozen women and children. The Rangers fired around the canoes filled with families. Harmon noted that at least 50 bodies went downstream before the rangers could retrieve them for their scalps. As a result of the raid, New Englanders flooded into the lower Kennebec region, establishing settlements there in the wake of the war. Two English militiamen were killed. Harmon burned the Abenaki farms, and those who had escaped were forced to abandon their village. The 150 Abenaki survivors returned to bury the dead before abandoning the area and moving northward to the Abenaki village of St Francois (Odanak, Quebec).

=== First European settlers ===
The first permanent European settlement of the area began in 1771. The first settlers of the region around Skowhegan were a small group of pioneers from southern Massachusetts who traveled by ship up the Kennebec River to the head of tide near Gardiner. From there, they made their way upriver on the eastern side to Winslow, in the area of Fort Halifax. There, any semblance of roads ended and it was necessary to follow rough trails (created by the indigenous inhabitants of the region) on the eastern bank of the river about twenty-five miles to their destination. Their first place of settlement was an island in the River of about nine acres in size that was part of the property acquired by Joseph Weston through the proprietary company known as Plymouth Company or Kennebec Proprietors, a Boston-based company seeking to settle the lands along the Kennebec River. Their initial claim was established through the purchase of a grant originally made to William Bradford in 1629 from the English monarch Charles I. The settlers arrived on an island two miles south of the Great Eddy of the Kennebec in the spring of 1771. The group consisted of two families, the Heywoods and the Westons. The Heywoods included Peter Heywood of Concord, his son Asa, and Isaac Smith, who lived with the Heywoods. The Westons included Peter Heywood's brother-in-law, Joseph Weston of Lancaster, and his son Eli. They built a cabin, planted corn and potatoes, and cut hay for their cattle. In late summer, Peter and Asa Heywood and Joseph Weston returned to their hometowns, leaving Eli Weston and Isaac Smith to finish harvesting their crops and tend the livestock. Unexpected delays caused both families to wait until the following spring to return, leaving the two boys to spend the winter alone on the island. Weston and Heywood brought the rest of their families back to the small settlement in April 1772. Dr. Nathaniel Whitaker was the first minister, first doctor, and something of a lawyer, having been educated at what is now Princeton University, according to the records at the Skowhegan History House. In 1811, Revolutionary War General Josiah Locke established a tavern (inn) at the corner of Main and West Front Streets. He operated the tavern for 50 years and was postmaster for 49 years.

=== Benedict Arnold ===
On September 29, 1775, Colonel Benedict Arnold and his troops passed through the village on their way to the ill-fated Battle of Quebec. Novelist Kenneth Roberts described Skowhegan Falls as the expedition faced it in these terms:

Half a mile short of the falls there was a right angle turn in the river [the Great Eddy] and below it a triple whirlpool because of the force with which the water shot around the bend from the narrow channel above. Here the bateaux slammed against the rocks... Above the chute between the ledges was a half-mile of hellish current... At the end of the half-mile run, there were the high Skowhegan Falls on each side of a craggy island in midstream.

— Kenneth Roberts, Arundel 1930 p. 235

Joseph Weston died of exposure as a result of this incident.

=== Creation of the town ===
The area was set off from Canaan and incorporated on February 5, 1823, under the name Milburn. The Dudley's Corner School House, on U.S. Route 2 east of the main village, was the municipal center in the early 19th century. The first officials of the town were as follows: Moderator, Joseph Patten; Town Clerk, Samuel Weston; Selectmen, Benjamin Eaton, Joseph Merrill, Samuel Weston, and Josiah Parlin. However, inhabitants preferred the old name of Skowhegan, as it would be renamed in 1836. In 1861, the town annexed Bloomfield across the river. Parts of Norridgewock were annexed in 1828 and 1856, and parts of Cornville in 1831 and 1833. The defunct town of Bloomfield (set off from Canaan and incorporated in 1814) was annexed in 1861. Part of Fairfield had been annexed to Bloomfield in 1858. Skowhegan became county seat in 1871.

=== Local industry and commerce ===
Farms produced hay, potatoes, wheat and wool. In 1818, the Skowhegan Fair was organized by the Somerset Central Agricultural Society, with the first fair held in 1819. The Somerset and Kennebec Railroad (later part of the Maine Central Railroad) reached the town in 1856. Skowhegan Falls provided water power for industry, and Skowhegan developed into a mill town. Numerous mills were built on Skowhegan Island, which separates the river into north and south channels. In the 19th century, the town had a paper mill, sawmill, two sash and blind factories, two flour mills, a wood pulp mill, three planing mills, a woolen mill, an oil cloth factory, two axe factories, a scythe factory, two harness and saddlery factories, a shoe factory and a foundry. A survey of labor organizations in 1903 noted the presence of the Bricklayers, Masons and Plasterers' Union; Carpenters and Joiners' Union; Laborers' Protective Union; and Painters, Decorators and Paperhangers. No mention of textile workers or shoemakers unions. However, by 1907 textile workers had joined the Industrial Workers of the World and declared a strike against the Marston Mills Company, saying that they needed a wage increase to "live rather than merely exist". The strike ended in victory for the workers, with every demand being met, including the reinstatement of forty-two workers who had been fired for union activity.

The town became home to the Women's Correctional Center in 1935 when women from the Maine State Prison in Thomaston were transferred to that new facility. The entire Thomaston facility has been closed since 2002. Skowhegan was one of many Maine communities that participated in the Ground Observer Corps defense effort in the 1950s. An observation post was located atop one of the buildings on the right side of Water Street. In 1976, Scott Paper Company opened a plant in Skowhegan which later became S. D. Warren Company, a division of Scott Paper Company. In 1997, the S. D. Warren mill was sold to Sappi Fine Paper. The New Balance Athletic Shoe Company operates a factory in the community.

In 2003, Skowhegan was a major filming location for an HBO movie based on the 2001 Pulitzer Prize winning novel Empire Falls, by Maine author Richard Russo. A restaurant on Water Street was renamed the Empire Grill after being filmed for the movie.

Skowhegan is the home of the annual KNEADING Conference. Established in 2007, topics covered during the conference include local wheat production, milling, baking and wood fired oven building are highlighted.

== Geography ==
According to the United States Census Bureau, the town has a total area of 60.47 square miles (156.62 km^{2}), of which 58.85 square miles (152.42 km^{2}) is land and 1.62 square miles (4.20 km^{2}) is water. Skowhegan is drained by the Wesserunsett Stream and Kennebec River. Loomis Hill, elevation 870 feet (270 meters) above sea level, is the highest point in town.

== Demographics ==
Historical population
Census	Pop.	Note	%±
1830	1,006		—
1840	1,584		57.5%
1850	1,756		10.9%
1860	2,266		29.0%
1870	3,893		71.8%
1880	3,860		−0.8%
1890	5,068		31.3%
1900	5,180		2.2%
1910	5,341		3.1%
1920	5,981		12.0%
1930	6,433		7.6%
1940	7,159		11.3%
1950	7,422		3.7%
1960	7,661		3.2%
1970	7,601		−0.8%
1980	8,098		6.5%
1990	8,725		7.7%
2000	8,824		1.1%
2010	8,589		−2.7%
2020	8,620		0.4%
U.S. Decennial Census

=== 19th century ===
The population in 1870 was 3,893. In 1880 it was 3,861.

=== 2000 census ===
As of the census of 2000, there were 8,824 people, 3,716 households, and 2,363 families residing in the town. The population density was 149.6 inhabitants per square mile (57.8/km^{2}). There were 4,165 housing units at an average density of 70.6 per square mile (27.3/km^{2}). The racial makeup of the town was 97.56% White, 0.25% Black or African American, 0.43% Native American, 0.54% Asian, 0.01% Pacific Islander, 0.12% from other races, and 1.08% from two or more races. Hispanic or Latino of any race were 0.73% of the population.

There were 3,716 households, out of which 29.7% had children under the age of 18 living with them, 46.3% were married couples living together, 13.0% had a female householder with no husband present, and 36.4% were non-families. 29.6% of all households were made up of individuals, and 12.1% had someone living alone who was 65 years of age or older. The average household size was 2.31 and the average family size was 2.81.

In the town, the population was spread out, with 23.5% under the age of 18, 8.2% from 18 to 24, 28.3% from 25 to 44, 23.7% from 45 to 64, and 16.4% who were 65 years of age or older. The median age was 39 years. For every 100 females, there were 91.4 males. For every 100 females age 18 and over, there were 86.9 males.

The median income for a household in the town was $28,390, and the median income for a family was $35,880. Males had a median income of $27,982 versus $21,011 for females. The per capita income for the town was $15,543. About 13.0% of families and 16.2% of the population were below the poverty line, including 22.0% of those under age 18 and 13.4% of those age 65 or over.

=== 2010 census ===
As of the census of 2010, there were 8,589 people, 3,765 households, and 2,258 families residing in the town. The population density was 145.9 inhabitants per square mile (56.3/km^{2}). There were 4,234 housing units at an average density of 71.9 per square mile (27.8/km^{2}). The racial makeup of the town was 96.9% White, 0.4% African American, 0.4% Native American, 0.7% Asian, 0.1% from other races, and 1.5% from two or more races. Hispanic or Latino of any race were 0.5% of the population.

There were 3,765 households, of which 28.5% had children under the age of 18 living with them, 41.0% were married couples living together, 13.9% had a female householder with no husband present, 5.0% had a male householder with no wife present, and 40.0% were non-families. 32.2% of all households were made up of individuals, and 14.5% had someone living alone who was 65 years of age or older. The average household size was 2.25 and the average family size was 2.80.

The median age in the town was 42.2 years. 22.1% of residents were under the age of 18; 8.1% were between the ages of 18 and 24; 24% were from 25 to 44; 28.2% were from 45 to 64; and 17.6% were 65 years of age or older. The gender makeup of the town was 47.2% male and 52.8% female.

== Arts and culture ==
=== Skowhegan Historic District ===
The Skowhegan Historic District is a homogeneous and cohesive grouping of 38 architecturally and/or historically significant buildings, most dating from 1880 to 1910. It encompasses the main commercial area including the most southerly block of Madison Avenue and the two westernmost blocks of Water Street. All major styles of the period are represented, including the work of architect John Calvin Stevens. Skowhegan is one of ten nationally designated Main Street communities in Maine, utilizing a strategic four-point approach to downtown revitalization, a program developed by the National Trust for Historic Preservation.

=== Bridges ===
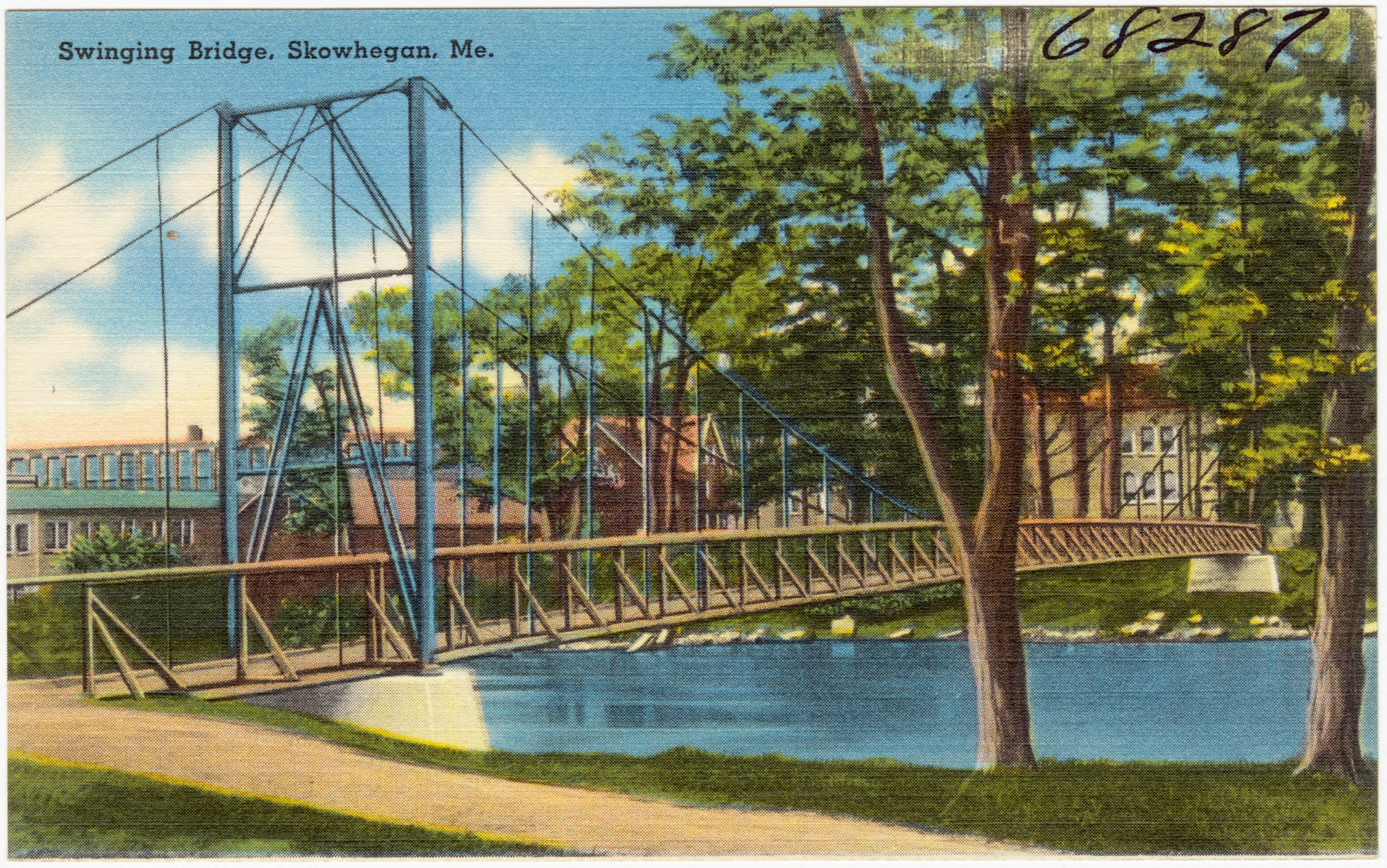
Swinging Bridge postcard c. 1930s

Among the town's features is the Swinging Bridge, a suspension footbridge first constructed in 1883 to connect Skowhegan Island with the south side of the Kennebec River. The swinging bridge was originally built for a local farmer to make his distance onto the island shorter for him to have to walk. This bridge lasted six years, until in 1888 the cables rotted and the bridge collapsed. A new bridge was built, which lasted until 1901, when a flood washed it out. Another bridge was built, higher this time, but in 1936, that bridge was washed out by a flood as well. It was rebuilt and has been in use since then. The Swinging Bridge was renovated in 2006 by the Skowhegan Highway Department, which earned the department a 2007 American Public Works Association Public Works Excellence Award. A railroad bridge was converted to a footbridge across the Kennebec River. This bridge was damaged in the Maine Flood of 1987.

=== Skowhegan Indigenous statue ===
On the north side of the municipal parking lot stands a 62-foot-tall (19 m) sculpture depicting an Abenaki, carved by Bernard Langlais and erected in 1969 in observance of Maine's Sesquicentennial with the dedication: "Dedicated to the Maine Indians, the first people to use these lands in peaceful ways."

=== Municipal Building and Opera House ===
Another landmark is the Beaux-Arts style Municipal Building and Opera House, designed by noted Portland architect John Calvin Stevens, and built in 1907–1909.

=== The Island ===
"The Island" once was the site of the old high school, which became the junior high, since demolished. It still is home to a church, a former textile mill, the historic fire station, and the "power house" serving the dam on the Kennebec River.

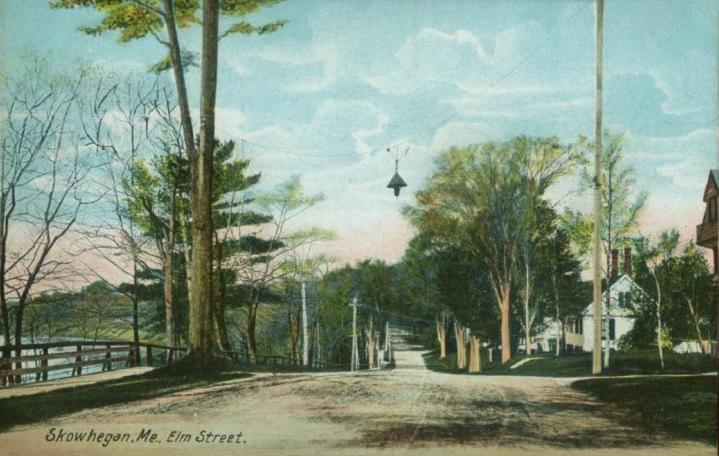
Elm Street in 1906

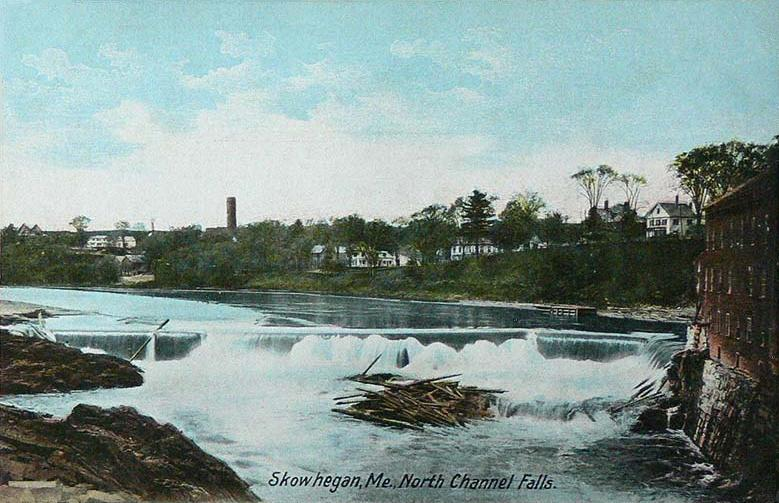
Skowhegan Falls in 1908

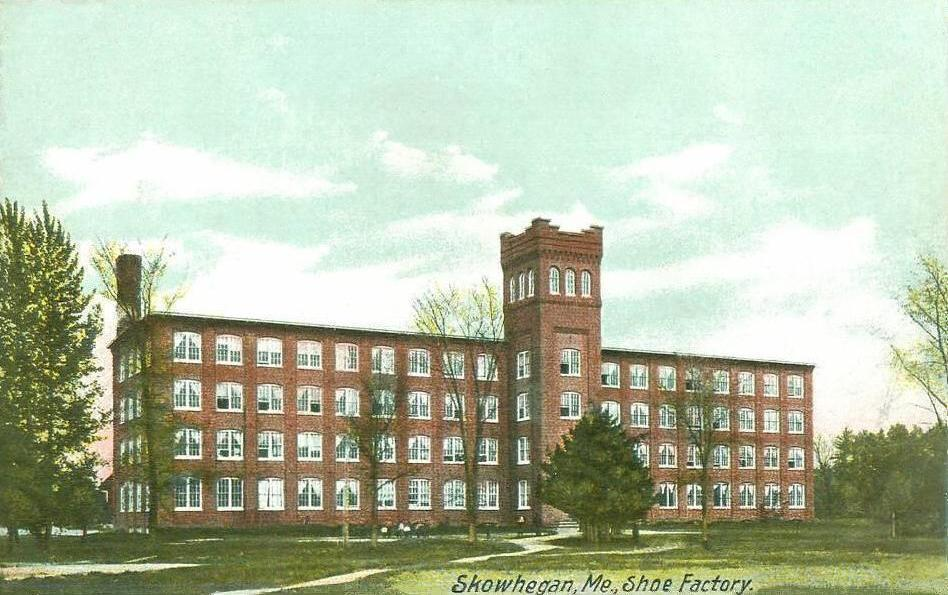
Shoe factory in 1907

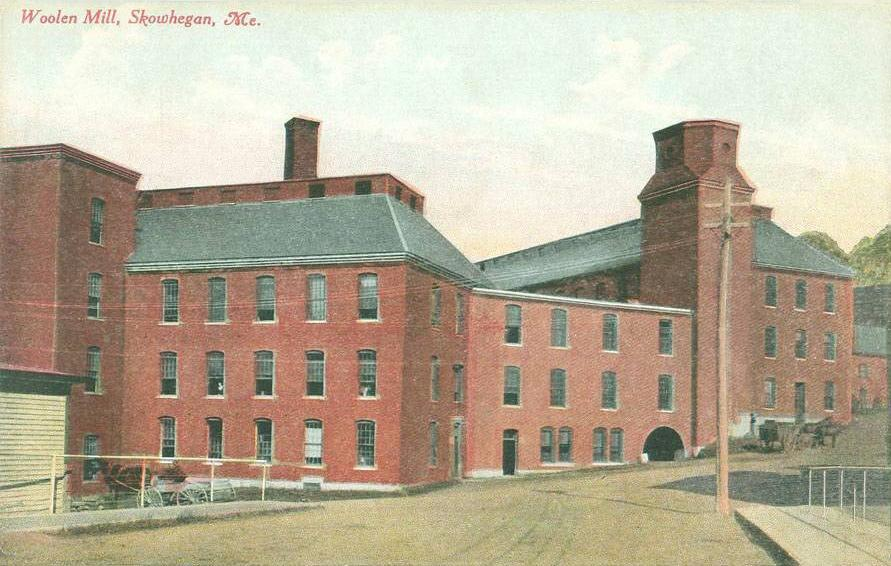
Woolen mill c. 1910

== Government ==
Skowhegan has a Town Meeting - Selectboard - Town Manager form of government, with a Town meeting, Board of Selectmen, and Town Manager. There are five selectmen, each serving three-year terms. Whitney Cunliffe is the current chairman of the Board of Selectmen, and Kevin Nelson is the current vice chairman. Amber Lambke, Elijah Soll, and Ethan Liberty serve as the other three selectmen.

Town meeting serves as the legislative body for the municipality.

The Board of Selectmen serve as the executive body for the municipality. The Selectboard holds a public meeting on the second and fourth Tuesday of each month at 5:30 p.m. in the Council Chambers of the Municipal Building, which all citizens are welcome to attend.

The Selectmen manage the Town of Skowhegan with the help of a town manager.

Skowhegan has a total of 13 departments:

- Town Manager's Office
- Town Clerk and Treasurer's Office
- Finance & Human Resources
- Assessor's Office
- Code Enforcement
- Solid Waste & Recycling
- Pollution Control
- Town Planner
- Economic & Community Development Office
- Fire Department
- Police Department
- Highway Department
- Parks & Recreation

== Notable people ==
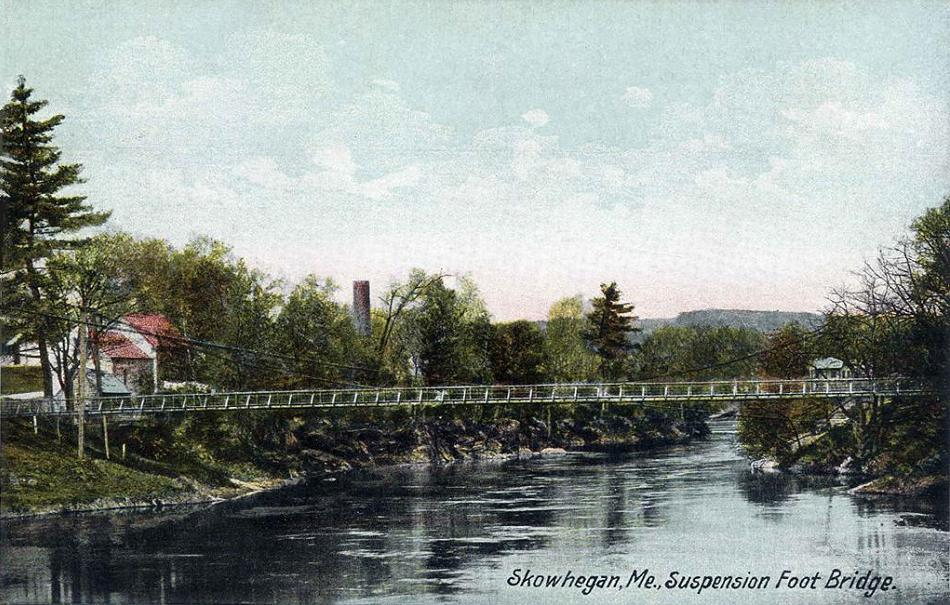
Swinging Bridge c. 1908

- Frank W. Bucknam, pharmacist
- Abner Coburn, 30th governor of Maine
- Louise Helen Coburn, founded the Sigma Kappa sorority
- Stephen Coburn, US congressman
- Daniel Dole, Protestant missionary educator to the Hawaiian Islands
- Donna Finley, Maine state legislator
- Forrest Goodwin, US congressman
- Samuel W. Gould, US congressman
- Pamela Hatch, Maine state legislator and Senator
- David Kidder, US congressman
- Kenneth P. MacLeod, Maine state senator
- Jeff McCabe, Maine state legislator
- Peter Mills, Maine state senator
- Benjamin White Norris, former U.S. Congressman for the 3rd District of Alabama
- Maynard Pennell, Boeing executive and chief engineer of the 707 prototype
- Russell B. Shepherd, businessman, Civil War officer, and politician
- Clyde Smith, US congressman
- Margaret Chase Smith, US senator and first significant female candidate for President in a party primary
- Hannah Judkins Starbird, American Civil War nurse
- Elise Fellows White, author and composer
- Rodney L. Whittemore, Maine State Senator

== See also ==
- First Baptist Church, Former (Skowhegan, Maine)
- Maine School Administrative District 54
- Skowhegan Fire Station
- U.S. Route 201A
- WFMX – Skowhegan radio station
