= Mog (Abenaki leader) =

Abenaki leader (1663–1724)

- Born: c. 1663
- Died: 1724 (aged 60–61); Norridgewock, Maine, U.S.

Mog (c. 1663 – 23 August 1724) was an Abenaki leader who resisted the expansion of the British colonies onto his homeland during the late 17th and early 18th centuries. Born in about 1663, he was the son of an Abenaki leader also named Mog, and had a brother named Marlon who was killed in 1677. Mog fought in King William's War and Queen Anne's War as an ally of New France, returning scalps of New England colonists to Quebec in exchange for payment.

After the 1713 Peace of Utrecht, Mog was forced to capitulate, giving the New Englanders free passage through their territory. Peace was ended in 1722 when a few Abenaki men attacked the Province of Massachusetts Bay, which declared war on the Abenaki. Alongside Father Sebastien Rale, he was killed in the Battle of Norridgewock on 23 August 1724 after being shot by a British-allied Mohawk whose son narrowly escaped being killed by Mog's musket fire.
