= Battle of Falmouth (1703) =

Battle

- Part of Queen Anne's War
Date	10–19 August 1703
Location	Falmouth, Maine
Result	French and Wabanaki Confederacy victory

Belligerents
New England	French colonists Abenaki

Commanders and leaders
Cyprian Southack; John March (wounded); Captain John Larrabee	Alexandre Leneuf de La Vallière de Beaubassin; Father Sebastian Rale; Moxus; Wanongonet; Escumbuit; Sampson

Strength
	500 Indians unknown Frenchmen

Casualties and losses
Reports vary; 25 killed; prisoners taken	Unknown

The Battle of Falmouth was fought at Falmouth, Maine when the Canadiens and Wabanaki Confederacy attacked the English New Casco Fort. The battle was part of the Northeast Coast Campaign (1703) during Queen Anne's War.

== Background ==
The border area between Acadia and New England in the early 18th century remained contested after battles between French and English colonists (and their allied Native Americans) during King William's War in the 1690s failed to resolve territorial disputes. New France defined the western border of Acadia as the Kennebec River in what is now southern Maine, while the English Province of Massachusetts Bay formally claimed all of the land between the Piscataqua and St. Croix Rivers (all of present-day Maine). During the 1670s the English had established settlements between the Kennebec River and Penobscot Bay, contesting claims by the French and the local Abenaki people to the area.

The French had established Catholic missions at Norridgewock and Penobscot, and there was a French settlement of long standing in Penobscot Bay near the site of modern Castine, Maine. All of these sites had been used as bases for attacks on English settlers during King William's War. The frontier areas between the Saint Lawrence River and the primarily coastal settlements of Massachusetts and New York were still dominated by natives (primarily Abenaki and Iroquois), and the Hudson River–Lake Champlain corridor had also been used for raiding expeditions in both directions in earlier conflicts. Although the Indian threat had receded somewhat due to reductions in the native population as a result of disease and the last war, they were still seen to pose a potent threat to outlying settlements.

Although war had broken out between France and England in 1702, the frontiers between New France and New England remained quiet until December of that year, when Governor-General Louis-Hector de Callière authorized the Abenaki to resume the border war. In addition to any plunder reaped from expeditions against the English colonies, Callière promised additional gifts. Callière died in May 1703, and was replaced by Philippe de Rigaud Vaudreuil, who vigorously promoted raiding activity as a means to maintain French influence with the Abenaki. Vaudreuil gave Alexandre Leneuf de La Vallière de Beaubassin, a military officer whose family's seigneury at Beaubassin had been raided in 1696 by New England forces, command of a small contingent of French forces and instructions to organize raids against English settlements.

Massachusetts Bay Governor Joseph Dudley did not believe that the Abenaki would go to war. In June 1703 Boston newspapers reported that the Abenaki were two thirds "for peace and one Third for warr", and Dudley had been unable to convince them to join the conflict on the English side. The Abenaki chief Moxus attempted to warn Dudley of Vaudreuil's aggressive posture, but Dudley brushed off these reports.

== Battle ==
The Wabanaki did the most damage to Spurwink and Purpooduck (Cape Elizabeth). In Spurwink, principally inhabited by the Messrs. Jordans and their families, the Wabanaki killed or captured 22. At Purpooduck, where there were nine families settled at Spring Point, they killed 25 and carried away eight prisoners.

The garrison of 36 men at Casco (Falmouth) was commanded by Major John March. The fort was the "most considerable" fort on the eastern coast. On August 10, 1703, under the leadership of Moxus, Wanongonet and Escumbuit, the Wabanaki appeared unarmed and sent him a message under a flag of truce; pretending they had some important matter to communicate. Apprehending no immediate danger, he proceeded with a guard of only two or three men. The Wabanaki ambushed March and shot one of his attendants. A garrison of 10 men under Sargeant Hook rescued March and the others. The Wabanaki killed two of March's companions, Phippenny and Kent, in the altercation.

The Wabanaki withdrew and skulked around the peninsula for a week, setting fire to the houses. The rest of the Wabanaki battalions, arrived at Casco in 200 canoes to continue the destruction of the village. They first took a sloop, two shallops and considerable plunder; and encouraged by success, they attempted for two days and nights, to undermine the fort from the water side, as was done during King William's War. On 19 August Captain Cyprian Southack arrived on the Province Galley and relieved the siege. The natives continued to stroll around Casco, they boarded a store ship and killed the captain and three others, while wounding two others.

On 26 September, Governor Dudley ordered 360 men to march toward Pigwacket, one of the main native villages, located at present-day Fryeburg, Maine. Leading 300 New Englanders, Major March chased the Wabanaki back to Pigwacket. March killed 6 and captured 6. These were the first New England reprisals of the war.

== Aftermath ==
In the spring of 1704, after the Raid on Deerfield in February, the Wabanaki again attacked Wells, and York. (In 1712, the Wabanaki conducted another campaign against these villages and towns. They killed or captured twenty-four people in three raids on three villages, one of the villages was Wells.)

In response to these events and the Raid on Deerfield, the governors of the northern English colonies called for action against the French colonies. Massachusetts Governor Joseph Dudley wrote that "the destruction of Quebeck and Port Royal [would] put all the Navall stores into Her Majesty's hands, and forever make an end of an Indian War", the frontier between Deerfield and Wells was fortified by upwards of 2,000 men, and the bounty for Indian scalps was more than doubled, from £40 to £100. Dudley promptly organized a retaliatory raid against Acadia. In the summer of 1704, New Englanders under the leadership of Benjamin Church raided Acadian villages at Pentagouet (present-day Castine, Maine), Passamaquoddy Bay (present-day St. Stephen, New Brunswick), Grand Pré, Pisiquid, and Beaubassin (all in present-day Nova Scotia).

There were also reprisals by the New Englanders against Norridgewock. During the winter of 1705, 275 soldiers under the command of Colonel Winthrop Hilton were sent to Norridgewock to seize Father Rale and sack the village. Father Rale escaped them, but they burned his church.

John March led an expedition against the Acadian capital of Port Royal in 1707.

The French drew off a great number of Indian families from the Penobscot, Norridgewock, Saco, and Pequaket tribes, and settled them at St. Francis, in Canada, as a protection against the Iroquois Confederacy. These were called the St. Francis Indians.
