= Richard Jacques (military officer) =

American military officer

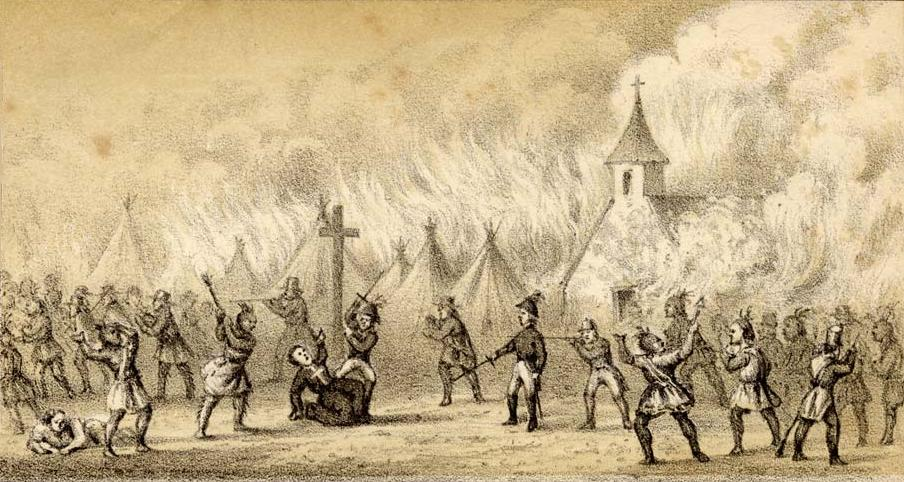
Death of Father Sebastian Rale of the Society of Jesus, an 1856 lithograph

Capt Richard Jacques (1704, Newbury, Massachusetts – 1745, Louisbourg, Cape Breton); an American colonial officer who served during Father Rale's War. He was responsible for the death of Father Sébastien Rale in the Battle of Norridgewock.

Jacques was the son-in-law of the leader of the expedition Johnson Harmon. Jacques married Harmon's daughter five months before they served together at Norridgewock. He settled in Harpswell, Maine at Merriconeag Neck (1727). He served in the Siege of Louisbourg (1745). He was the commander of the 8th Company of the Second Massachusetts Regiment under Samuel Waldo. Family oral tradition indicated that he returned from Louisbourg and died in battle in Maine. However contemporaneous sources indicate that he did not return from Louisbourg, and that on May 18, Mi'kmaw forces killed Capt. Jacques there.

== Legacy ==
- He is the namesake of Jaquish Island (Harpswell, Maine) (Jaquesh Island, Jaques's Island); south of Bailey Island (Maine).
