= Philip Huntoon =

American farmer

Philip Huntoon (c. 1664 – May 10, 1752) is said to be the ancestor of all persons in America bearing the name "Huntoon." Philip Hunton, as he was first called, signed his name (or made his mark) on 20 Feb 1688/89 below a humble Addresse of the Inhabitants and train soldiers of ye Province of New Hampshire to the governor of Massachusetts. We can suppose, therefore, that Philip was born before 1668. He was granted land in Exeter, New Hampshire in 1697. He removed to Kingston a few years later, where he lived for the rest of his life.

Huntoon was one of many New England farmers captured by Native Americans. Jeremy Belknap, the first New Hampshire historian, quoted a letter from Ward Clark to someone named "King":

"The same day that Colonel Winthrop Hilton was killed, a company of Indians who had pretended friendship, who the year before had been peaceably conversant with the inhabitants of Kingston, and seemed to be thirsting after the blood of the enemy, came into the town, and ambushing the road, killed Samuel Winslow and Samuel Huntoon. They also took Philip Huntoon and Jacob Gilman, and carried them to Canada; where, after some time, they purchased their own redemption by building a saw-mill for the governor after the English mode."

Huntoon died May 10, 1752, having fathered six children, four of them surviving to adulthood, and two of them sons who had many descendants.

For reasons now lost, during his lifetime he came to be called Philip Huntune, or more commonly Philip Huntoon.

== Citations ==
- Daniel T. V. Huntoon, Philip Hunton and his descendants (Canton, Massachusetts: University Press, 1881)
- Allan F. Abrahamse, The Huntoon Family in Colonial America, second edition (Long Beach, California: by the author, 2003)
