= Battle of Falmouth =

Battle of Falmouth may refer to:

- Battle of Falmouth (1690)
- Battle of Falmouth (1703)
- Battle of Falmouth (1779)
