= Johnson Harmon =

British army officer (1675-1751)

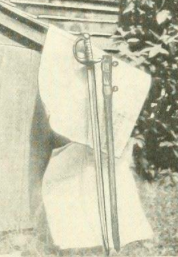
Col Johnson Harmon Sword he received from Col. Thomas Westbrook (1724) for leading the Raid on Norridgewock

Col Johnson Harmon, signature

Colonel Johnson Harmon (or Harman; c. 1675 – 1751) was an army officer in colonial America. He led the expedition during Father Rale's War that killed Father Sébastien Rale in the Battle of Norridgewock. Harmon was heralded as a hero upon his return to Boston. New England Officer and historian Samuel Penahallow proclaimed the attack was "the greatest victory we have obtained in the three or four last wars."

== Career ==
Harmon was from York and was a teenager during the Raid on York (1692) during King William's War. During Queen Anne's War, in 1707 he was present, with his younger brother John, at Winter Harbour (Biddeford, Maine) he helped repulse the attack of natives in 50 canoes. In this battle Benjamin Donnell was killed by Indians. On 10 October 1710 Bomazeen with 60–70 Indians attacked the village of Winter Harbour, killing 3-4 and taking many more prisoner, including Harmon. (Harmon was part of the expedition that killed Bomazeen, upon their return from the Battle of Norridgewock.) He was released from captivity at Chambly, Quebec on 22 May 1711 in exchange for Beauvenire de Vercheres who was taken in the Raid on Haverhill (1708).

In 1716, Harmon was considered for the position of messenger for the Indians.

A year prior to the Battle of Norridgewolk, the Abenaki Indians made a failed attempt to assassinate Harmon.

Harmon was the brother-in-law of the second-in-command of the expedition to Norridgewock, Col. Jeremiah Moulton. He was the father-in-law of the soldier that killed Rale, Richard Jacques.

Harmon was representative to the Massachusetts General Court (1727).

At age 70, Harmon applied to fight in the Siege of Louisbourg (1745). While Harmon did not fight in the Siege, Moulton and Jacques did.
