= Raid on York (1692) =

Action of King William's War

- Part of King William's War
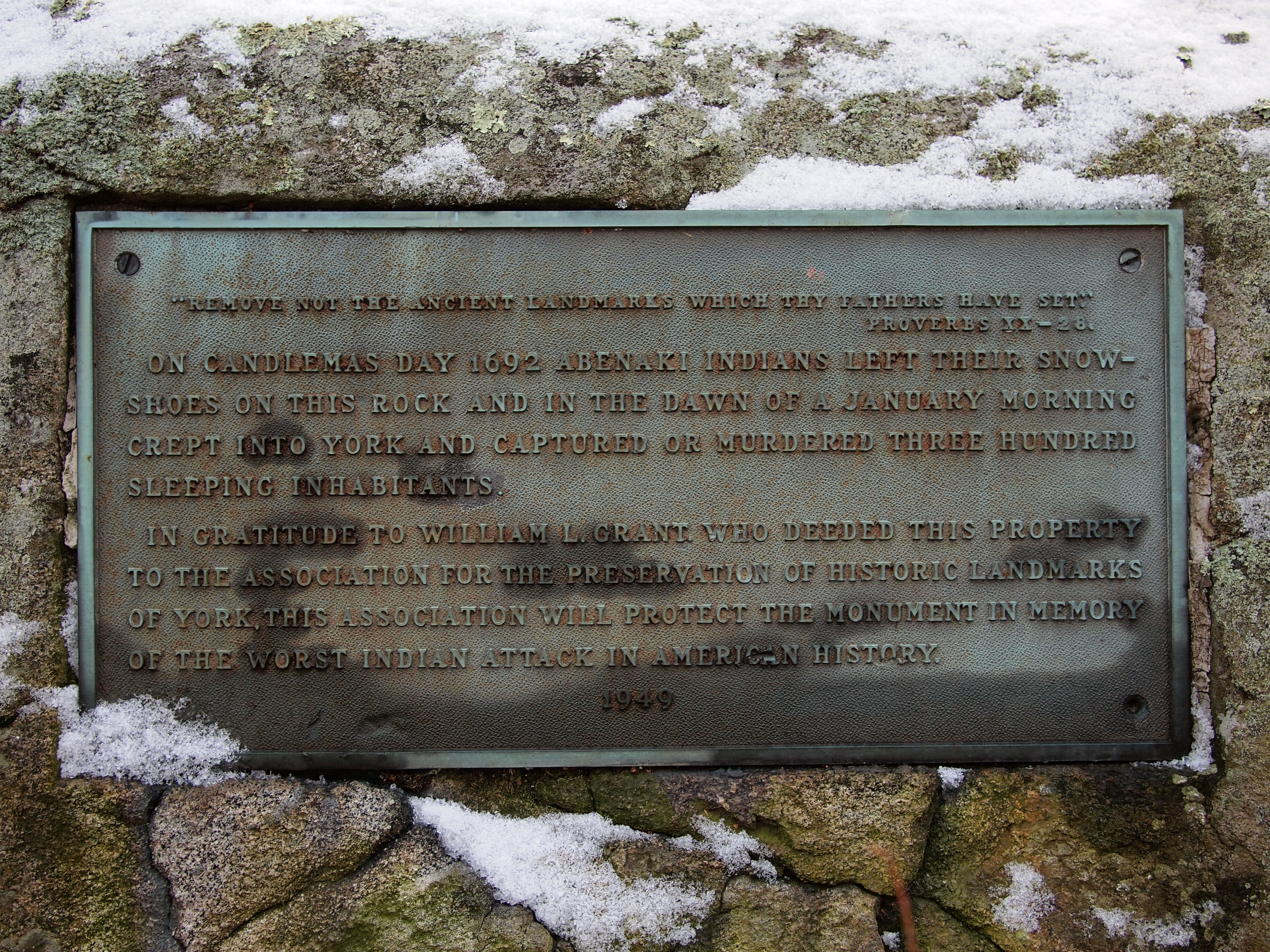
- Memorial plaque in York, ME
Date	24 January 1692
Location	York, Massachusetts, British America 43°08′38″N 70°39′02″W
Result	French and native victory

Belligerents
New France; Acadia; Abenaki	New England Colonies

Commanders and leaders
Chief Madockawando, Father Louis-Pierre Thury; Sr. de Portneuf	Preble, John Harmon, Alcock, and Norton

Strength
200–300 Abenaki and Canadiens	

Casualties and losses
Unknown	75 killed and 100 prisoners Abenaquis reported killing or capturing 187 people

The Raid on York (also known as the Candlemas Massacre) took place on 24 January 1692 during King William's War, when Chief Madockawando and Father Louis-Pierre Thury led 200-300 natives into the town of York (then in the District of Maine and part of the Province of Massachusetts Bay, now in the state of Maine), killing about 100 of the English settlers and burning down buildings, taking another estimated 80 villagers hostage. The villagers were forced to walk to Canada, New France, where they were ransomed by Capt. John Alden Jr. of Boston (son of John Alden and Priscilla Mullins of the Plymouth Colony). One of those taken captive was a young Jeremiah Moulton, who would later gain renown during Father Rale's War.

Capt. Floyd wrote that "the houses are all burned and rifled except the half dozen or thereabout". Later in the same letter he adds "there is about seventeen or eighteen houses burned". Forty-eight people were buried by Capt. Floyd, and the remaining number were young children whose names never appeared on the existing town records.

Amongst those killed was Reverend Shubael Dummer, the Congregational church minister; Dummer was shot at his own front door, while Dummer's wife, Lydia and their son, were carried away captive where "through snows and hardships among those dragons of the desert she also quickly died"; nothing further was heard of the boy. The Indians set fire to all undefended houses on the north side of the York River, the principal route for trade and around which the town had grown. After the settlement was reduced to ashes, however, it was rebuilt on higher ground at what is today York Village.

Capt. John Flood, who had come with the militia from Portsmouth, found on his arrival that "the greatest part of the whole town was burned and robbed," with nearly 50 killed and another 100 captured. He reported that Rev. Dummer was "barbarously murthered, stript naked, cut and mangled by these sons of Beliall."

There is a memorial plaque in York on a large stone where, according to the plaque, Abenaki Indians left their snowshoes before creeping into York and attacking the settlers.

== See also ==
- List of massacres in Maine
