= Norridgewock =

- Norridgewock Archeological District
- U.S. National Register of Historic Places
- U.S. National Historic Landmark District
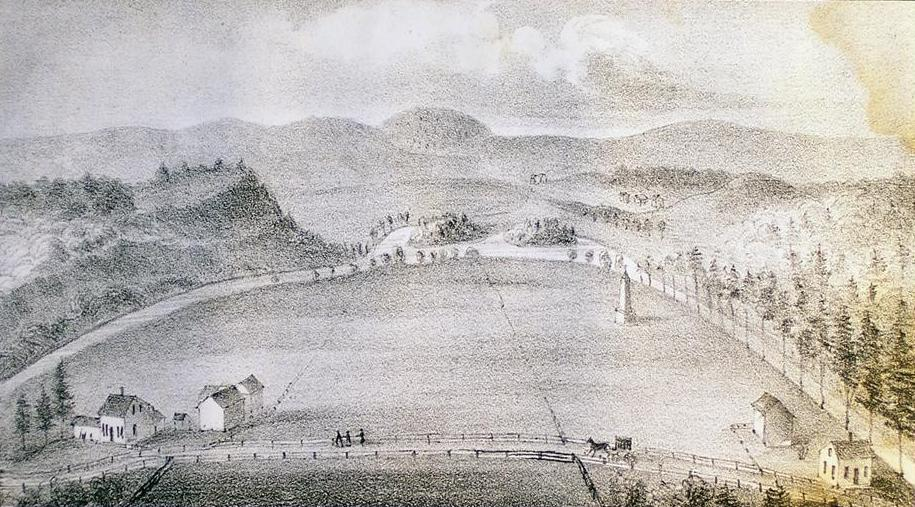
- Old Point in 1849

- Location within Maine Location within the United States
- Location: Norridgewock, Starks, and Madison, Maine
- Coordinates: 44°46′1″N 69°53′0″W
- Built: 1625
- NRHP reference No.: 93000606

Significant dates
- Added to NRHP: April 12, 1993
- Designated NHLD: April 12, 1993

Norridgewock (Abenaki: Nanrantsouak) was the name of both an Indigenous village and a band of the Abenaki ("People of the Dawn") Native Americans/First Nations, an Eastern Algonquian tribe of the United States and Canada. The French of New France called the village Kennebec. The tribe occupied an area in the interior of Maine. During colonial times, this area was territory disputed between British and French colonists, and was set along the claimed western border of Acadia, the western bank of the Kennebec River.

Archaeological evidence has identified several different sites associated with the settlement known as Norridgewock. The last one, where the French Jesuit priest Sebastian Rale had a mission, is today called Old Point, and is located in Madison. Other sites are located nearby in Starks and the present-day town of Norridgewock. Three of these historically and archaeologically significant areas have been collectively designated as the Norridgewock Archaeological District, a National Historic Landmark District.

== Norridgewock Village ==
Norridgewock is a corruption of the word Nanrantsouak, meaning "people of the still water between the rapids." Their principal village, also called Norridgewock, was located near 44.767°N 69.8833°W on a plateau within a broad bend of the Kennebec River, opposite its confluence with the Sandy River. A 1716 account by surveyor Joseph Heath describes the village as a square fort surrounded by a 9-foot (2.7 m) palisade fence, each side 160 feet (49 m) long with a gate at its center. The fort's walls faced the major points of the compass. Two streets connected the gates, forming an open square at the center marked by a large cross. The stockade enclosed 26 cabins "built much after the English manner"—probably of logs. Canoes were beached along the river, although paddles were stored in the cabins. Extensive fields were cleared nearby for cultivation of maize, wheat, beans, pumpkins and squash. Twice a year, summer and winter, the tribe spent a few months at the seashore catching fish, seals, clams, oysters and seafowl.

France claimed the Kennebec River because it provided a potential route to invade Quebec (as Benedict Arnold would demonstrate in 1775). English colonists claimed the St. George River because they held deeds, even though the sachems who signed them often believed they were only granting the right to use the land for hunting, fishing or safe passage. The French insisted that the sachems were not empowered to sell land, since the Abenaki territory belonged to the entire tribe. France and England were at peace, and New France could not take overt action against the settlements (and particularly their alarming blockhouses) in the disputed area. Instead, the French government secretly engaged the Indians, guided by their French Jesuit missionaries, to hinder the expansion of English colonists. Missionaries with a dual loyalty to church and king were embedded within Abenaki bands on the Penobscot, St. Croix and Saint John rivers. However, Norridgewock Village was considered Quebec's predominant advance guard.

In 1694, Father Sébastien Rale (or Rasle) arrived at Norridgewock to establish a Jesuit mission, the first school in Maine and referred to the settlement as Narantsouak. He built a chapel of bark in 1698, and despite objections from the medicine men, Rale converted most of the inhabitants to Roman Catholicism. The chapel burned in 1705, but it was replaced with a church in 1720. It stood twenty paces outside the east gate, and measured 60 feet (18 m) long by 25 feet (7.6 m) wide, with an 18-foot (5.5 m) ceiling. Forty Abenaki youths in cassocks and surplices served as acolytes. In a 1722 letter written to John Goffe, the church was described by Johnson Harmon and Joseph Heath as:

... a large handsome log building adorned with many pictures and toys to please the Indians ...

Speaking the Abenaki language fluently, Father Rale immersed himself in Indian affairs. His "astonishing influence over their minds" raised suspicions that he was inciting hostility toward the Protestant British colonists, whom he considered heretics.

Seasonal Migrations and Food in letter written by Father Sébastien Rasle:

“… when they are obliged to live at the Seashore, — where they go twice every year, for the purpose of finding provisions. Our Savages have so destroyed the game of their Country that for ten years they have no longer either elks or deer. Bears and Beavers have become very scarce. They seldom have any food but Indian corn, beans, and squashes. They crush the corn between two stones, reducing it to meal; afterward they make of it a porridge, which they sometimes season with fat or with dried fish. When they are without corn, they search the cultivated fields for potatoes, or even for acorns, which they value as highly as corn; after having dried these, they roast them in a kettle with ashes, in order to take away their bitterness. As for me, I eat them dry, and they take the place of bread.

“At a certain season, our people go to a river not very far distant, where during one month the fish ascend the river in so great numbers that a man could fill fifty thousand barrels with them in a day, if he could be equal to that work. These fish are a sort of large herring, very agreeable to the taste when they are fresh; they crowd upon each other to the depth of a foot, and are drawn up as you would draw water. The Savages put them to dry for eight or ten days, and they live upon them during the whole time while they are planting their fields.

They plant corn only in the spring, and do their last tilling about Corpus Christi day*; after that, they consider to which place by the Sea they shall go to seek food until the time of harvest, which generally takes place shortly after the Assumption†.” … *60 days after Easter … †August 15

== King William's War ==
=== Raid on Oyster River ===
During King William's War, on July 18, 1694, French soldier Claude-Sébastien de Villieu with about 250 Abenakis from Norridgewock under command of their sagamore (leader), Bomazeen (or Bomoseen) raided the English colonial settlement of Durham, New Hampshire, in the "Oyster River Massacre". The French and Abenakis killed 45 English settlers and took 49 more captive, burning half of the village, including five garrisons. They destroyed the crops and killed all of the livestock, causing famine and destitution for the survivors.

== Queen Anne's War ==
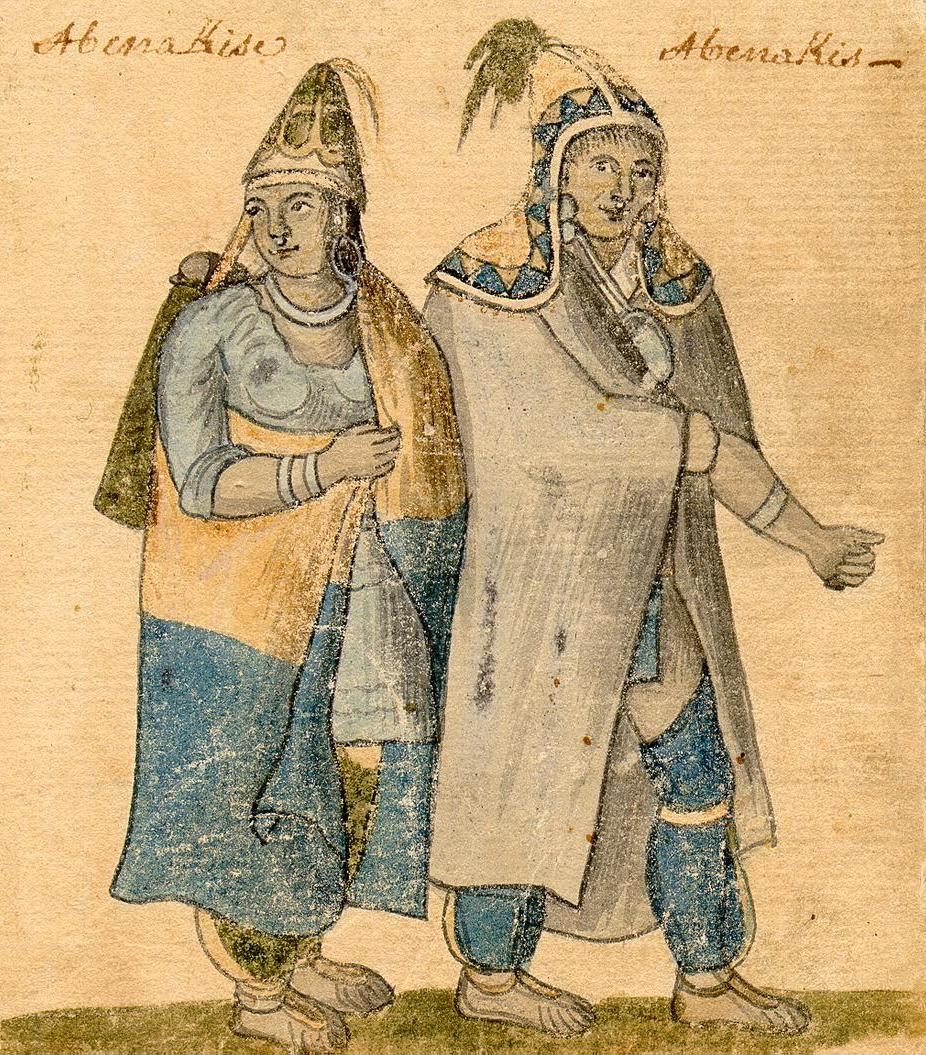
Abenaki couple, an 18th-century watercolor by an unknown artist. Courtesy of the City of Montreal Records Management & Archives, Montreal, Quebec

When Queen Anne's War broke out, with New France and New England again fighting over the border between New England and Acadia, Massachusetts Governor Joseph Dudley arranged a conference with tribal representatives in 1703 to propose that they remain neutral. On the contrary, however, the Norridgewock tribe in August joined a larger force of French and Indians, commanded by Alexandre Leneuf de Beaubassin, to attack Wells in the Northeast Coast Campaign. Father Rale was widely suspected of inciting the tribe against English colonists because their settlements and blockhouses encroached on Abenaki land (and so uncomfortably close to Quebec), but also because they were Protestant and therefore heretics. Governor Dudley put a price on his head. In the winter of 1705, 275 English colonial militia under the command of Colonel Winthrop Hilton were dispatched to seize Rale and sack the village. Warned in time, the priest escaped into the woods with his papers, but the militia burned the village and church.

=== Raid on Wells (1703) ===
As part of the Northeast Coast Campaign (1703), 500 Indians, including those from Norridgewock and a few French, commanded by Alexandre Leneuf de Beaubassin, raided Wells on August 10 and 11, 1703.

=== Raid on Norridgewock (1705) ===
In retaliation, there was a bounty put on Father Rale. Finding the village deserted in the winter of 1705 because its occupants, including Rale had been warned of an impending attack, Colonel Winthrop Hilton ordered his 275 English colonial militia to burn the village and the church.

With the Treaty of Utrecht and Treaty of Portsmouth (1713), however, peace was restored between France and England. Terms of the treaty required that the French yield Acadia to the English. The boundary of Acadia remained in dispute. The two nations disagreed, and consequently imperial boundaries between Quebec and the Province of Massachusetts Bay remained unclear and disputed until the Treaty of Paris in 1763.

In 1713, the Norridgewocks had sought peace with English at the Treaty of Portsmouth, and accepted the convenience of trading posts operated by English settlers on their land (though they protested the tendency of the settlers to cheat them). After all, beaver and other skins could be exchanged for cheap goods following a journey of one or two days, when travel to Quebec up the Kennebec, with its rapids and portages, required over 15 days.

== Dummer's War ==
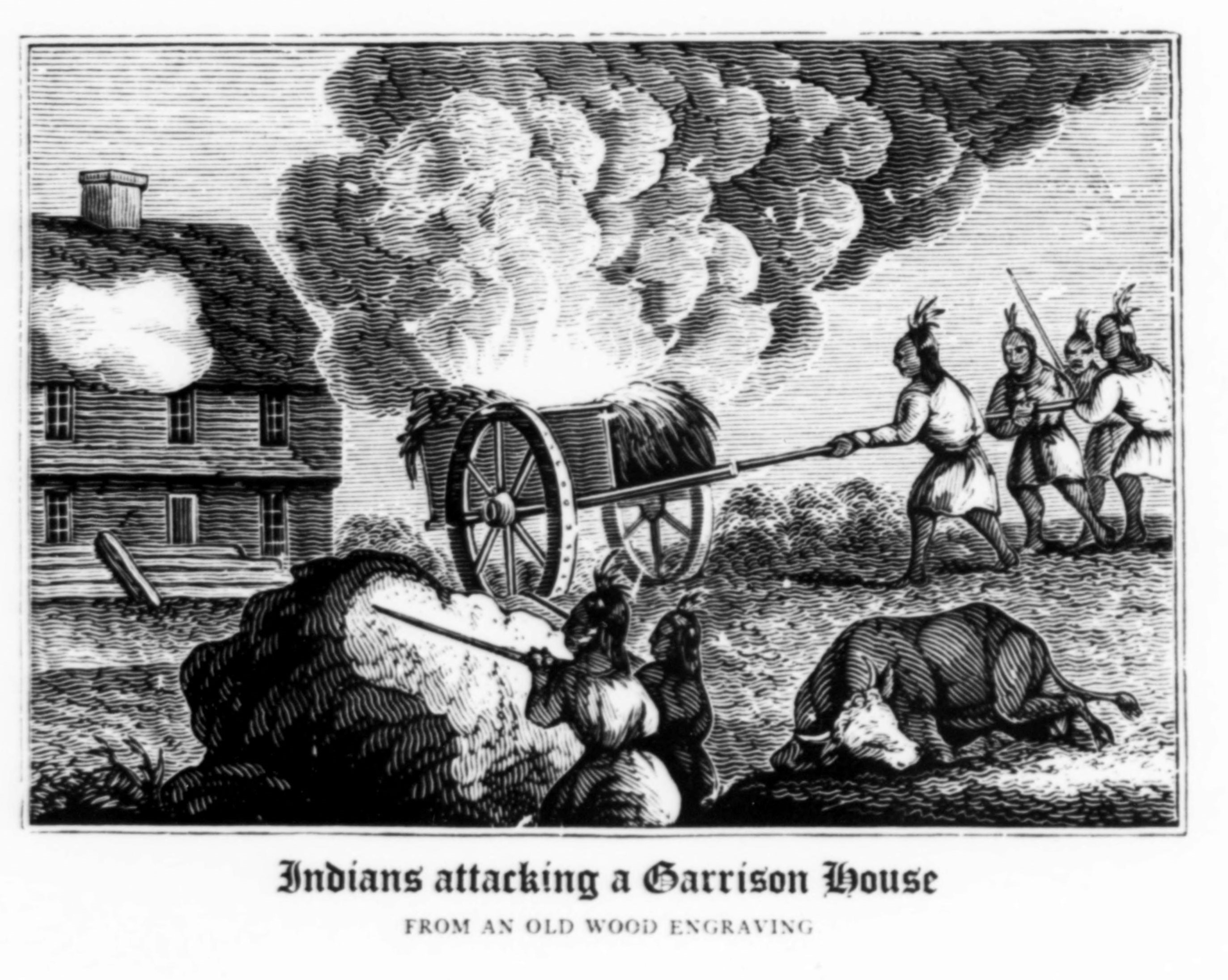
An incendiary attack

But their acceptance of English settlers faded as Rale instigated the tribe against the encroachment of houses and blockhouses that followed trading posts. He taught the Abenaki that their territory should be held in trust for their children. On July 28, 1721, 250 Abenakis in 90 canoes delivered a letter at Georgetown addressed to Governor Samuel Shute, demanding that English settlers quit Abenaki lands. Otherwise, they would be killed and their settlements destroyed.

=== Raid on Norridgewock (1722) ===
In response, Norridgewock was raided in January 1722 by 300 English colonial militia under Colonel Thomas Westbrook. They discovered the village almost deserted, with the gates wide open. The tribe was gone hunting. Troops searched for Rale but found only his papers, including letters from New France Governor-general Vaudreuil promising ammunition for Abenaki raids on English colonial settlements. The tribe retaliated for the invasion by attacking settlements below them on the Kennebec, burning Brunswick on June 13, 1722. Some of the raids were accompanied by Rale, who would occasionally allow himself to be seen from houses and blockhouses under siege. On July 25, 1722, Massachusetts Governor Samuel Shute declared war on the eastern Indians.

=== Battle of Norridgewock (1724) ===
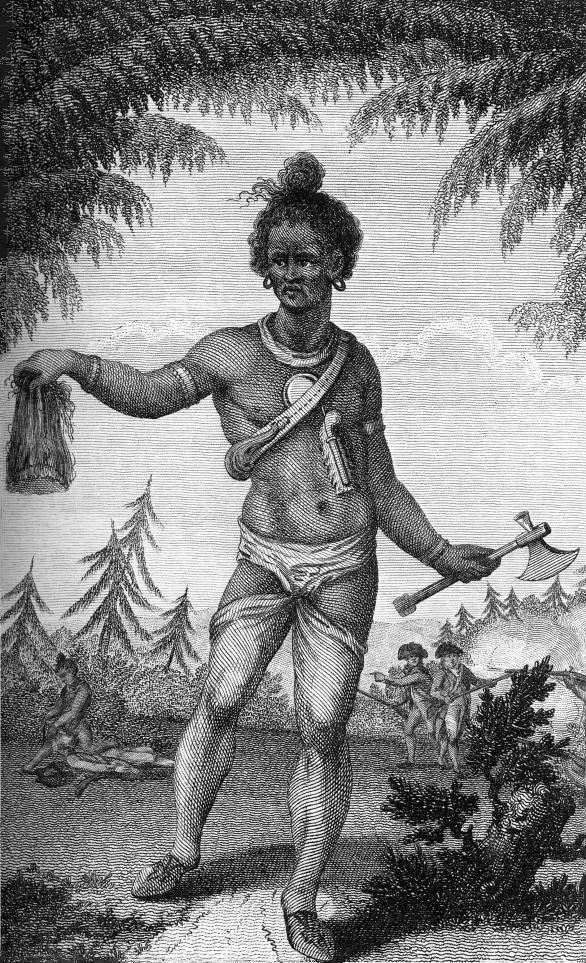
Indian warrior with scalp

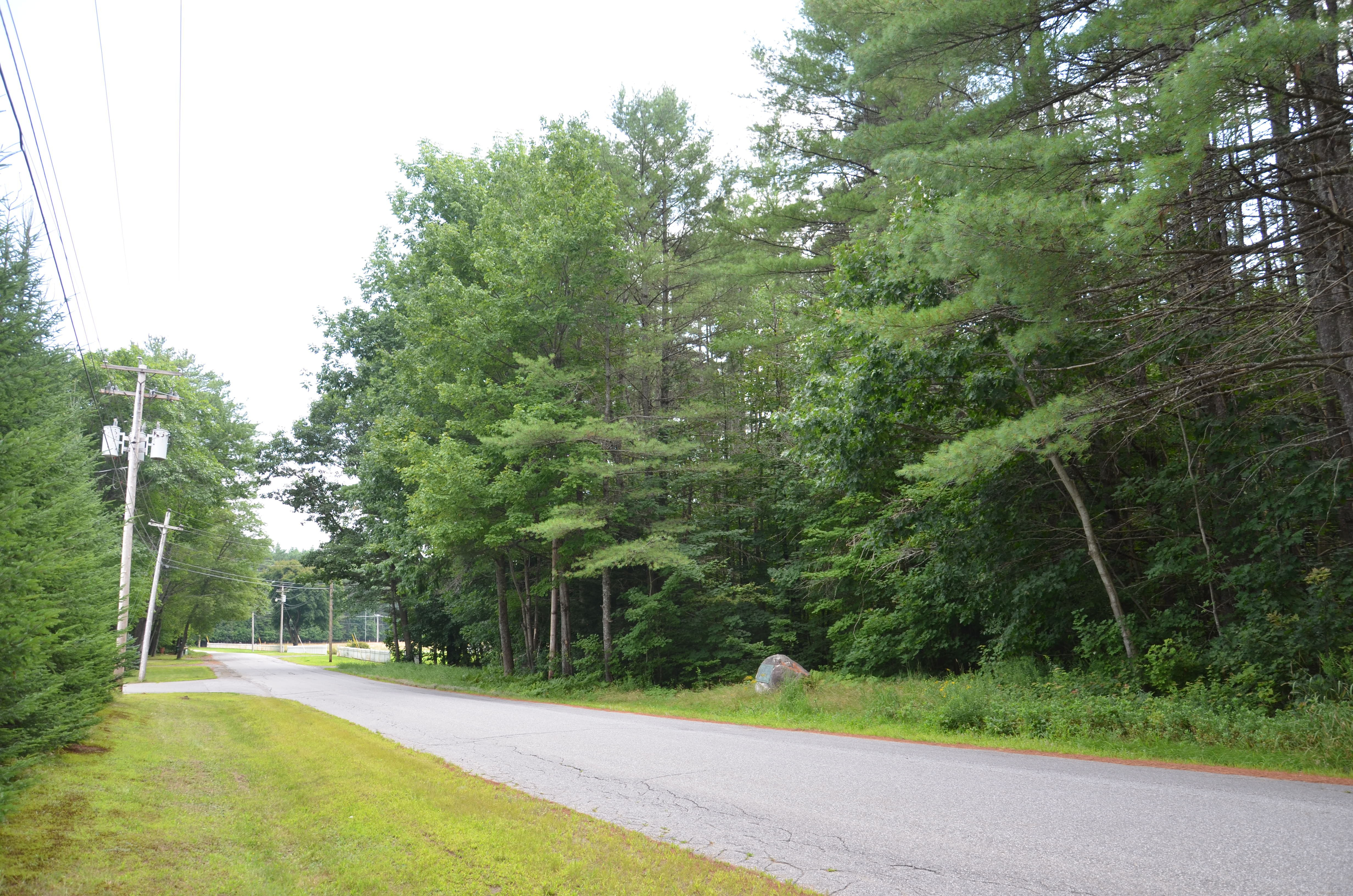
The site of the Norridgewock Native American village in Maine, in what is now Madison. The rock at the side of the road bears a plaque marking the site.

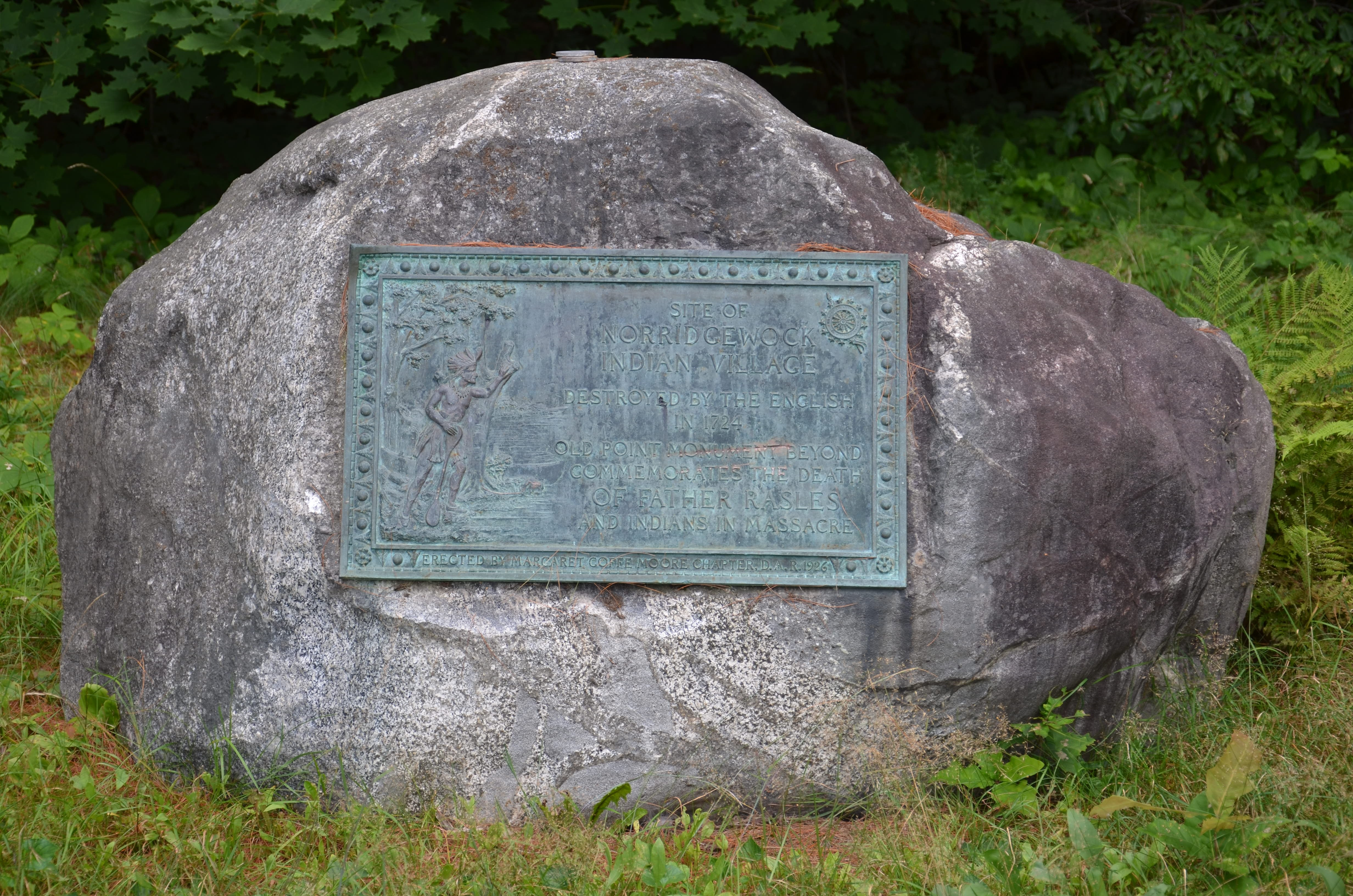
Detail of the memorial plaque.

During Dummer's War, at about 3:00 pm on August 23, 1724 (N. S.), a force of English colonial militia attacked Norridgewock for the last time. A force of 208 militia had left Fort Richmond (now Richmond) and divided, leaving about 80 militiamen including three Mohawks under the command of Captain Jeremiah Moulton. His militia quietly approached the village, which at that time no longer had a stockade. A startled Indian emerging from a cabin gave a war whoop, then darted back inside to get his musket. Norridgewock women and children ran from houses to swim or ford across the river and up into the woods. In the confusion, about 60 braves fired guns wildly but did little harm. At that point the militia, ordered to withhold fire until after the enemy's first volley, took aim—with deadly effect. The warriors fired again, then fled across the river, leaving 26 dead and 14 wounded. Bomazeen (or Bomaseen), the sachem, who with Sebastien de Villieu had led 250 Abenakis to Durham, New Hampshire on July 18, 1694, for the Oyster River Massacre, was shot fording the Kennebec at a place thereafter called Bomazeen Rips. From a cabin, old Chief Mogg shot one of the Mohawks, whose brother then shot him. Meanwhile, from another cabin Father Rale was firing at the militia. Refusing to surrender, he was shot through the head while reloading his gun.

Scalps of the dead were collected for bounties in Boston. The militia plundered 3 barrels (0.48 m^{3}) of gunpowder, together with a few guns, blankets and kettles, before returning to their whaleboats at Taconic Falls. One of the Mohawks, a brave named Christian, slipped back to set the village and church on fire, then rejoined the militia. The 150 survivors of Norridgewock returned the next day to bury the dead. Subsequently, most abandoned the area and, "in deplorable condition", relocated to Saint-François and Bécancour in Quebec. A few years later, however, many survivors returned to the Upper Kennebec from their refuge in Quebec, and a Jesuit missionary, Jacques de Sirenne, was assigned to their spiritual care.

== People of Narantsouak ==
What we know of the people of Narantsouak (aka Norridgewock) comes from the pens of European settlers. Written accounts exist showing how the Narantsouak were viewed differently in their relations with the French than with the English. William Allen, in the earliest pages of The History of Norridgewock (1849) wrote of the opposing perspectives:

"The French Jesuits…describe them as 'docile and friendly,' 'accessible to the precepts of religion,' 'strong in their attachments to their friends,’ and ‘submissive to the rites and ceremonies of the Catholic faith.'" In contrast, the English described the Indians of Maine as: "…’the very outcasts of creation, discovering no footsteps of religion, but merely diabolical,' 'the veriest ruins of mankind,' and 'the most sordid and contemptible part of the human species.'" These discrepancies might be explained by relationship: the Jesuits lived within the Native villages, ate the same food, spoke their languages, and succeeded in winning the Narantsouak to France (albeit often treating them as children) whereas the English came to conquer, dominate, sometimes kidnapping and enslaving, and convert the Abenaki to their Puritan religion. Both, however, traded with them.

=== Leaders at Narantsouak (Norridgewock) ===
==== Taxous chief before Wissememet (bef 1672 - c1721) ====
(aka Taxus or Toxus) a warrior and chief before Dummer’s War (1722-1725); a negotiator later in life. Taxous is recorded as being a Canibas from the Kennebec River; he was the principal chief of the Kennebec and married a woman from Pentagoet, settling there with her. Pentagoet was located at the mouth of the Penobscot River (Castine, Maine) the original home of the Tarantine Indians, now known as the Penobscot. At that time there were also Maliseets in residence. ^{268-269}

In 1692 the English burned the Canibas stronghold at Teconnet Falls (now Ticonic Falls in Waterville, Maine) possibly named for a chief Teconnet. A great number removed to the new Jesuit mission at Norridgewock, about 15 miles overland but many could still be found at Pentagoet among the Maliseets. ^{268} In May of 1695, leadership in Western Acadia (Maine) was in the hands of Edgeremet chief of the Kennebecs, and Taxous, chief of the Pentagoet River Indians. ^{270} In February of 1695/96 the English commander Pasco Chubb called several Wabanaki sagamores to Pemaquid where he deceitfully turned on them and killed two Kennebecs, Edgeremet and Abenquid. Several of the group escaped, including Taxous, and spread the news of this betrayal. Revenge was taken against Chubb at Andover, Maine, in 1698 when he was murdered in his home. Taxous ultimately became the most prominent leader between the Kennebec and Penobscot Rivers. ^{270}

Jesuit Pierre La Chasse’s census of 1708 records both Taxous and Bomazeen at Pentagoet. ^{272} Along with other Wabanaki chiefs, Taxous signed the treaty of 1713 with the British at Portsmouth. As one of the older leaders, Taxous had come to desire peace, but Father Rasle, in conjunction with Vaudreuil, Governor General of New France, disagreed leading Rasle to interpose himself into the internal politics of the Narantsouak.

Taxous died about 1721, “John Gyles, September 17, 1720, reported, ‘there is a large Crue of them gon with thier Cieff toxsos to Canaday to have friars seremonys put on him.’" ^{FN55} Taxous was succeeded as chief by Wissememet. ^{FN55}

==== Bomazeen (c1645 - 1724) ====
(or Bomaseen) father of Moxus, father-in-law of Mog and Wissememet. Bomazeen was a Norridgewock war leader in times contemporary with Taxous. A signatory of the Treaty with the Eastern Indians in 1693 at Fort William Henry, Pemaquid he was involved in several raids during King William’s War.

In 1694, following the Oyster River Massacre described in this article, Bomazeen arrived again at the fort at Pemaquid “under a flag of truce” and was seized by the English commanders from whence he was transported to Boston and imprisoned. This betrayal fueled Bomazeen’s resistance.

The Jesuit priest Father Rasle left his own account of the capture:

“At about that time, a score or so of Savages entered one of the English dwellings, either to trade, or to rest themselves. They had been there only a short time when they saw the house suddenly invested by a force of nearly 200 armed men. We are dead men, cried one of the Savages, let us sell our lives dearly. They were already preparing to rush upon this force when the English, perceiving their intention, and knowing also of what a Savage is capable in his first outbursts of fury, endeavored to appease them. They assured them that they had no evil design, and that they only came to invite a few of them to repair to Boston, for the purpose of conferring with the Governor about methods of maintaining the peace, and the good understanding that ought to exist between the two Nations. The Savages, a little too credulous, appointed four of their tribesmen who went to Boston; but, when they arrived there, the conference with which they had been beguiled ended by their being made prisoners…You will, without doubt, be surprised that such a little handful of Savages should have presumed to cope with so numerous a force as that of the English. But our Savages have performed numberless acts that are much more daring.'" ^{102-103}

During his captivity, Bomazeen had several discourses about Christianity with Cotton Mather, a Puritan minister who wrote about the meetings in a published volume (in which Mather refers to himself in the third person):

“Bommaseen was, with some other Indians, now a prisoner, in Boston. He desired a conference with a minister of Boston, which was granted him. Bommaseen, with the other Indians assenting and asserting to it, then told the minister, that he prayed his instruction in the Christian religion; inasmuch as he was afraid, that the French, in the Christian religion, which they taught the Indians, had abused them. The minister enquired of him, what of the things taught them by the French, appeared most suspicious to them? He said, the French taught them, that the Lord Jesus Christ was of the French nation; that His Mother, the Virgin Mary, was a French lady; that they were the English who had murdered Him; and, that whereas He rose from the dead, and went up to the Heavens, all that would recommend themselves unto His favour, must revenge His quarrel upon the English, as far as they can. He asked the minister, whether these things were so, and prayed the minister to instruct him in the True Christian Religion… ‘This is the poison which the French have put into the cup’."

Bomazeen was released from prison in 1699. Subsequently he was a signatory at several conferences including those in Boston, Massachusetts 1713, Portsmouth, Maine 1716, and Georgetown, Maine in 1717 and 1720. In about 1718, frustrated with French non-action, an English party formed within Narantsouak. Bomazeen joined this faction which included Nagiscoig, brother of Wowurna. Yet another meeting was held in Georgetown with the English in 1720. Bomazeen was killed along with his family during the 1724 British attack on Norridgewock — one is able to find several different versions of his death.

==== Moxus son of Bomazeen (c1660 - aft 1727) ====
(aka Mauxis, Agamagus) son of Bomazeen, was born on the Kennebec. He later became an influential Penobscot leader and sagamore and is believed to be the successor of Penobscot chief Madockawando. Moxus led sundry raids against English settlements and took part in peace treaties. He attended a truce conference at Pemaquid in 1677, agreed and signed articles of peace along with Madockawando and "all ye other Sagamores.” He became head of all Indians, from Piscataqua to the Penobscot, with Squando's men under him. Moxus “chief sagamore of the Kennebec Abenaki” signed a land deed in 1685 with Richard Pateshall of Boston. ^{239} The Maine State Museum HRI-FNE digital archives show other deeds signed by him through the 1690s.

In August of 1689, an attack was led by Jean-Vincent d’Abbadie de Saint-Castin (the father) from Acadia, with Chief Moxus and Father Louis-Pierre Thury against Fort Charles at Pemaquid. The defeat of the British (Siege of Pemaquid) caused the English to desert their settlements and retreat below Casco (Falmouth) Maine. It was a great victory for the French/Abenaki alliance, and many captives were taken. In 1691 and 1692 Moxus was involved in attacks at York, Maine, with his French Allies, and in 1694 at Oyster Bay, New Hampshire and Groton, Massachusetts. After being rebuilt, Fort Charles (renamed Fort William Henry) was again attacked and defeated by the French and 400 Abenaki in August 1696; the second Siege of Pemaquid. The defeated English commander was Pasco Chubb who had killed two Kennebec chiefs in February 1695/96 — this was the same trap from which Taxous had escaped.

Moxus became the chief sachem of the Norridgewock by 1701. With other Wabanaki leaders, he met with the English in June 1701 at Casco Bay and with Gov. Dudley of Boston in July of 1702. The Wabanaki were feared by the English and as a consequence, the British followed Native protocols in these negotiations. The stated goal of the British was to reassert the “mutual and publick League between us.” At this meeting “Mauxis” was recorded as from Norridgewock.^{16} A third conference was called by Dudley in 1703, again at Casco Bay. Moxus and Atecouando were chief spokesmen for the tribes. Dudley’s goal was to keep the Indians neutral; however, they did not remain so.^{103} Moxus was a signatory of the Treaty at Portsmouth along with Mog, Bomazeen, Taxous and other chiefs in July of 1713 and another in 1717.

Moxus was not recorded among the dead after the massacre at Norridgewock in 1724, an indication that he was not residing at Norridgewock but possibly with the Penobscot. He seems to have been living but aged in 1727 when the Abenaki signed on to peace ending war with the English and freeing them from their French ties. He died before 1730.

==== Mog or Mogg son-in-law of Bomazeen (c1663 - 1724) ====
(aka Heracouansit, Warracansit, Warracunsit, Warrawcuset) son-in-law of Bomazeen and son of Old Mog, born c.1663 (likely on the Saco River) died 23 Aug 1724. Mog participated in raids on the English settlements during King William’s and Queen Anne’s wars. He was a signatory of the Treaty at Portsmouth with the British along with Moxus, Bomazeen, Taxous and other chiefs in July of 1713. Directly after, he sailed with this group and British officials to Casco Bay where the treaty was presented to 40 other chiefs. He continued attending conferences through 1713-1714 in Boston and Portsmouth, looking for peace and trying to improve trading relations. There was another conference in Quebec in 1716. In 1720 Mog and Wowurna led a delegation to Georgetown to protest further encroachment by the settlers. As “Young Mogg” he was described as “a man about 50 years, a likely Magestick lookt Man who Spake all was said.”

In 1722 Massachusetts declared war on the Narantsouak who soon joined with other Abenaki forming a party of about 400 warriors and destroyed all of the English settlements on the lower Kennebec River from Eastern Maine to the Connecticut Valley. On 23 Aug 1724 the English raided the village of Norridgewock. Mog was killed alongside his family. Their scalps were taken to Boston along with those of 22 others and that of Father Rasle, to collect the bounty.

Mogg's father was Mogg Heigon (Mog Hegan) aka Old Mog. Mogg Heigon was a sachem from the Saco River who had a connection with Madokwando of the Penobscots. Early historians have written that Mogg Heigon had spent much time with the English and learned their language. The fact that his father was named Walter indicates that the British had long influenced his community; Englishmen had been fishing in the Saco Bay as early as the 1500s. ^{348} In a deed found in the York Deeds, Book II, dated on 31 May 1664, he described himself as: “Mogg Heigon of Saco river of New England, sunn and heyre of Walter Heigon sagamore of sayd river.” His “inheritance” was a hunting ground between the Kennebunk and Saco rivers where game, fowl and fish were plentiful. ^{map pg 344} Once he sold his inheritance, he dropped the usage of Heigon/Hegan as a surname. ^{347}

Ancestors. Were Mogg's Heigon ancestors a part the same coastal Abenaki community who famously mooned Giovanni da Verrazanno during his 1524 mapping voyage along the Coast of Maine, near the mouth of the Kennebec River?

"…If we wanted to trade with them for some of their things, they would come to the seashore on some rocks where the breakers were the most violent, while we remained in the little boat, and they sent to us what they wanted to give us on a rope, continually shouting to us not to approach the land; they gave us the barter quickly, and would take in exchange only knives, hooks for fishing, and sharp metal. We found no courtesy in them, and when we had nothing more to exchange and left them the men made all the signs of scorn and shame that any brute creature would make." Those brute signs included showing their buttocks and laughing.

==== Wissememet son-in-Law of Bomazeen ( -1724) ====
(Wesemimet) son-in-law of Bomazeen. History places Wissememet at Narantsouak on the Kennebec. In early historical accounts, he was frequently recognized by both Indigenous allies and European settlers as a proponent of peace, who advocated for treaties with the English. ^{105-107} Trading with the English was also a priority since Québec was a two week journey as opposed to being about two days distant from the nearest English trading post.

The most direct primary source regarding Wissememet’s election as chief after Taxous died are letters from Father Sébastien Rasle himself. In his communications with his family back home and officials of New France, Rasle explicitly detailed the internal political divide within the Narantsouak. The election of Wissememet infuriated Father Rasle and Governor General Vaudreiul. Baxter relates their displeasure:

"Rale, in evident chagrin, wrote Vaudreuil the result of the election. The reply to this letter reveals the odious character of Vaudreuil, He was indignant at the faintheartedness of the savages in making pledges to the English, and thought that active efforts should be made to obtain the aid of the Canadian tribes to awaken their zeal. The new chief [Wissememet] was made to feel the displeasure of the French at his pacific attitude; and Ouaourenewas [Wowurna] flattered and rewarded for displaying his opposition to them. A number of 'degraded' savages, friendly to the English, were sent to Quebec by Rale, and their reception by the governor may be imagined from this passage from his letter to the priest, 'You may depend I will make the degraded, sensible how much I am discontent with their conduct.'"

Wissememet was one of the chiefs killed at the Massacre in Norridgewock on 23 Aug 1724 as recorded in the Boston News-Letter, published on the 28th of August.

While Wissememet separated himself from French and Jesuit pressure in his desire to make peace with the English, his descendants can be found in the Catholic church records at St. Francis during the decades surrounding the turn into the nineteenth century. Wissememet’s descendants include Chief Pierre Wasamimet who, in September 1804, was one of seventeen men awarded a land grant at Durham following the American Revolution. Other surnames included Capino aka Pinwas, Annance, Ottandosen, Michel, Baptiste, Portneuf, Gill, and Pogkikan, names familiar in Odanak today. The original Notary Record with all of the names was executed on 8 September 1804, "Agreement between Joachim Ottanrawermin, Francis Annance and Others, Indians of the Village of St. Francis." The original plot map of 1802 is in the Rare Books and Special Collections, McGill University Library.

Pierre was among the Abenaki of Odanak who fought in the War of 1812 and in the Census at Odanak in 1825. The spelling of his surname varied in the records from Wesanminet, Wasanmimette, and Wazamimet to 8ézan8imet. Images of original documents can be found on ancestry.com

Children of Wasamimet who remained or emigrated to Maine and New York generally shortened their name to Emmet or Emmett and include the well-known Adirondack canoe maker Daniel Emmett (1871-1953). One of the canoes Emmett made for Avery Rockefeller survives and is currently exhibited at the Adirondack Experience museum at Blue Mountain Lake.

==== Wowurna (c1698 - aft 1738) ====
(aka Wiwurna, Captain Joseph, Oüaourené, Ouwoorana) (Sheepscot Jo, Wiwurna) older brother of Nagiscoig (Captain John). Wowurna was a leading chief of the Narantsouak and an ally of the French.^{[} As a young and fiery speaker, Wowurna was a favorite of Father Sébastien Rasle. In August 1717 he represented Norridgewock, Penobscot, Pigwacket, and Androscoggin Indian leaders on Arrowsic Island at Georgetown with Governor Samuel Shute of Massachusetts. Wowurna rejected the English’s right to build forts and settle new lands, insisting they had no right to settle on the Kennebec:

“We can’t understand how our Lands have been purchased, what has been Alienated [transferred] was by our gift.” “Wiwurna: ’This Place was formerly Settled and is now Settling at our request: And we now return Thanks that the English are come to Settle here, and will Imbrace them in our Bosoms that come to Settle on our Lands.’ Shute, interrupting: ‘They must not call it their Land, for the English have bought it of them and their Ancestors.’ Wiwurna: ‘We Pray leave to proceed in our Answer, and talk that matter afterward. We desire there may be no further Settlements made. We shan't be able to hold them all in our Bosoms, and to take care to shelter them, if it be likely to be bad weather, and Mischief be Threatened.’ … Shute responded, ‘We desire only what is our own, and that we will have.’"

These statements got Wowurna booted from the meetings by Schute and replaced by a less aggressive negotiator. Father Rasle, however, revered Wowurna's “matchless pride.” The following is an excerpt Father Rasle's letter of complaint to Governor Vaudreuil after the meeting on Arrowsic Island where he felt that the new chief, Wissememet, was too lenient:

"When the council assembled, the acts of the English, which had been placed in the worst light by the French, were made the pretext for immediate hostilities by the younger and more violent men, but wiser counsels prevailed, and Wissememet, a champion of peace, was elected. A short time after, a friendly conference was held at Georgetown, at which was present not only the chief, whom Rale calls 'Ketermogus,* a cipher in the Village,'* because of his love of peace; but, also, Ouaourene,† whom he praises for his hostility to the English, and both not only declared themselves to be friends of peace, but moreover delivered hostages to confirm this declaration in New England.” ^{106} — at Georgetown August 1717 … *Cateramogus … †Wowurna

An anti-French group formed about 1718 among the Narantsouak encouraged by the Iroquois, but most were too attached to their Catholicism and Father Rasle to abandon the French. They had traveled to Québec to voice their concerns and gain a promise from the French governor to send military aid if it became necessary, but the terms of the French/English treaty of Utrecht did not allow for such military actions. The feeling was strong that the French were not doing enough, that the assurances of the French governor were not sincere. For the first time, an English party formed. Nagiscoig, brother of Wowurna, joined this faction which included Bomazeen. Mog formed a nativist party that included Wowurna which called for neutrality. A third group wanted peace at any price.

The English continued to expand into Abenaki territory in spite of these talks; the Narantsouak killed their cattle. The British came to Maine in January of 1720 to warn them and listen to their complaints, but nothing changed. The Indians killed a great quantity of the Englishmen's animals and destroyed their crops. More meetings ensued but the Abenaki could not budge the English. A major confrontation at Georgetown occurred on 17 July 1721. Fathers Rasle and La Chasse, Joseph d’Abbadie de Saint-Castin (the son) and Charles Legardeur de Croisille accompanied 250 Indians into the town. In a letter to Shute, they demanded the release of hostages and the removal of the encroaching English. In this meeting, Wowurna read the demands aloud in Abenaki. Again Wowurna was praised by Ralse in a letter to Governor Vaudreuil, who in turn wrote of him to the French King. In January of 1722 the British made an attempt to capture Rasle. After a period of uneasy peace, the Indians retaliated in June in a raid on Merrymeeting Bay where they burned houses, took clothing and belongings, and five prisoners which they hoped to exchange for Abenaki hostages, but the British declared war in July. Wowurna was involved in the war and was presented a lace cap for his services for the French. After the destruction of Norridgewock in August of 1724, Wowurna removed to Canada. It is unclear if Wowurna were in Norridgewock at the time of the attack or if he were someone who escaped.

Wowurna was part of the group that ratified the peace at Falmouth in 1727. He met again with the British at Falmouth in 1732 and warned that quarrels between the English and younger Indians threatened the peace, and resisted a new settlement proposed for Cushnok in Maine. A visit to Boston in July 1738 for more talks was his first visit to that town, and probably his last.

==== Captain Job and Captain Carabesset ====
Recognized warriors and leaders who were killed during the raid on Norridgewock, 23 August 1724. In his sworn report made on the 25th, Captain Johnson Harmon wrote, “The Chiefs that we know among the Dead, were the said Jesuit, Colonel Bomarzeen, Captain Mogg, Captain Job, Captain Carabasset, Captain Wissememet, Bomarzeen's Son-in‑law, and some others whose Names I cannot Remember.” Eckstorm noted that the military titles were added by the English.

It is widely believed by historians that Carrabassett Valley and the Carrabassett River in Maine were named in his honor by European settlers following the conflict.

== Legacy ==
Norridgewock Village is the setting for the 1836 poem Mogg Megone by John Greenleaf Whittier.

Archaeological investigation of the Old Point area has identified three separate areas that are historically associated with the appellation "Norridgewock". The principal site at Old Point has long been well documented, and was listed on the National Register of Historic Places in 1973 as "Old Point and Sebastian Rale Monument", recognizing not just the site itself, but also the placement of a commemorative marker at the site in 1833. A second site called Tracy Farm is located about 500 metres (1,600 ft) north of the confluence of the Sandy and Kennebec Rivers in Starks, on the west side of the Kennebec. This site was first professionally excavated in 1983, with finds matching historical descriptions of very early references to Norridgewock. Extensive excavation in 1990 collected 15,000 artifacts from the Late Woodland and early contact periods, and identified the site of at least one longhouse. Another site, located nearer the confluence of the two rivers in Starks, also yielded evidence of habitation during the Late Woodland period. This site showed evidence of repeated flooding, suggesting that the habitation areas were later moved to the higher grounds of Tracy Farm and Old Point. These three sites were collectively designated a National Historic Landmark District and added to the National Register of Historic Places in 1993.

== See also ==
- List of National Historic Landmarks in Maine
- National Register of Historic Places listings in Somerset County, Maine
