= English America =

English America could refer to:

- Anglo-America, parts of the Americas where English is spoken.
- British America, parts of the Americas that were ruled by England and later the United Kingdom.
  - Thirteen Colonies, the predecessor to the United States
