= Battle of Norridgewock =

Massacre of Wabanaki people at Norridgewock, Maine, during Father Rale's War in 1724

Coordinates: 44°46′01.2″N 69°52′59.9″W

Norridgewock Massacre
- Part of Dummer's War
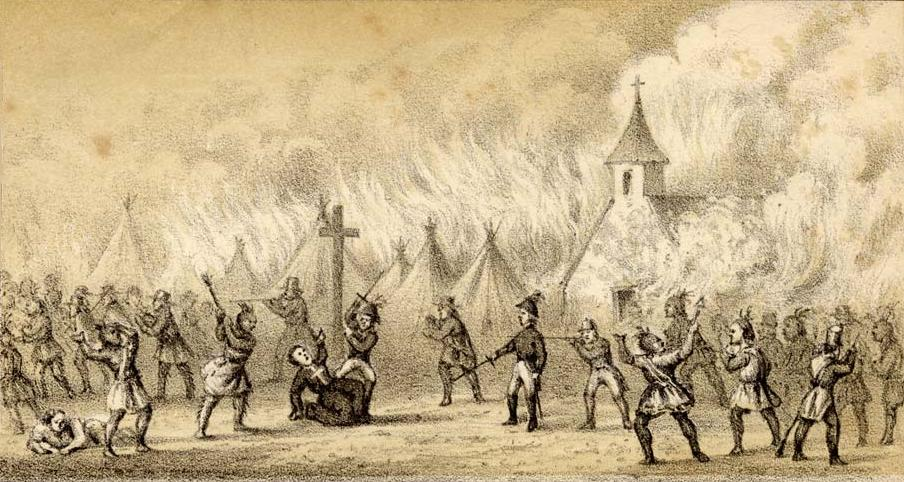
- A lithograph of the battle depicting Rale's death
Date	23 August 1724
Location	Norridgewock
Result	New England victory

Belligerents
Wabanaki Confederacy	New England Colonies

Commanders and leaders
(Kingdom of France) Sébastien Rale †; Chief Mog †; Chief Bomoseen †; Chief Wissememet †; Chief Job †; Chief Carabesett †	Johnson Harmon; Jeremiah Moulton; Richard Bourne †

Strength
+80	160

Casualties and losses
Approx. 80; 14 wounded	3 killed

The Battle of Norridgewock, also known as the Norridgewock Massacre, was a raid on the Abenaki settlement of Norridgewock by a group of colonial militiamen from the New England Colonies. Occurring in contested lands on the edge of the American frontier, the raid resulted in the massacre of the Abenaki inhabitants of Norridgewock by the militiamen.

The raid was undertaken to check Abenaki power in the region, limit Catholic proselytizing among the Abenaki (and thereby perceived French influence), and to allow the expansion of New England settlements into Abenaki territory and Acadia. New France defined this area as starting at the Kennebec River in southern Maine. Other motivations for the raid included the special £100 scalp bounty placed on Râle's head by the Massachusetts provincial assembly and the bounty on Abenaki scalps offered by the colony during the conflict.

Captains Johnson Harmon, Jeremiah Moulton, and Richard Bourne (Brown) led a force of two hundred colonial New Englanders, which attacked the Abenaki village of Narantsouak, or Norridgewock, on the Kennebec River; the current town of Norridgewock, Maine developed near there. The village was led by, among others, the sachems Bomazeen and Welákwansit, known to the English as Mog. The village's Catholic mission was run by a French Jesuit priest, Father Sébastien Râle.

Casualties, depending on the sources consulted, vary, but most accounts record about eighty Abenaki being killed. As a result of the raid, New Englanders flooded into the lower Kennebec region, establishing settlements there in the wake of the war. (Note: While Massachusetts secured parts of Maine in order to establish settlements, not until the treaty of 1752 did Massachusetts officially lay claim to the entire Penobscot watershed, and in 1759 the Pownall Expedition, led by Governor Thomas Pownall, established Fort Pownall on Cape Jellison in what is now Stockton Springs.)

== Background ==
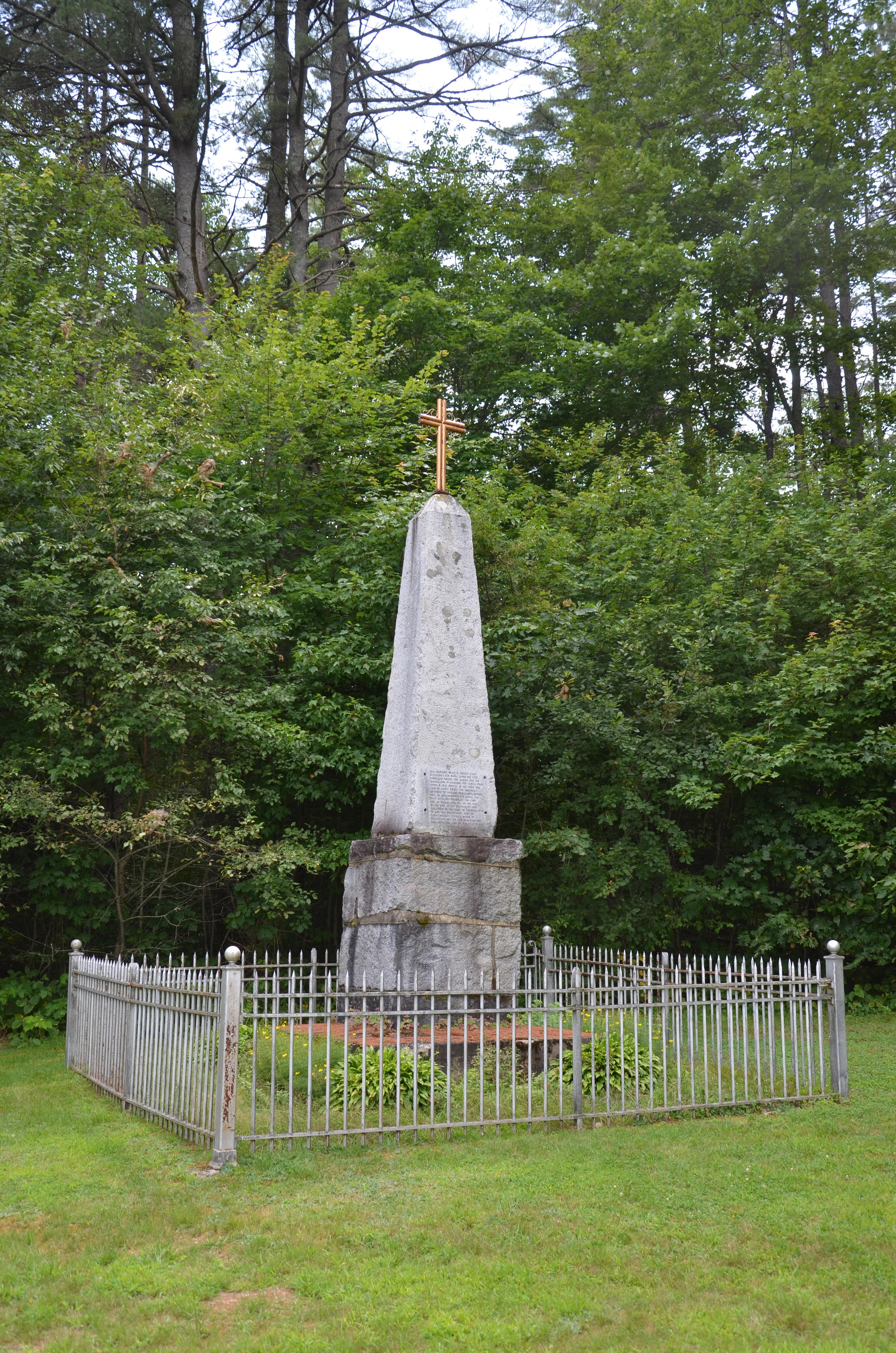
The memorial monument for Father Sébastien Râle at the Norridgewock battle site in Madison, Maine.

The Treaty of Utrecht (1713), which ended Queen Anne's War, had facilitated the expansion of New England settlement. The treaty, however, had been signed in Europe and had not involved any member of the Wabanaki natives. Since they had not been consulted, they protested this incursion into their lands by conducting raids on British fishermen and settlements. For the first and only time, Wabanaki fought New Englanders and the British on their own terms and for their own reasons and not principally to defend French imperial interests. In response to Wabanaki hostilities toward the expansion, the Governor of Nova Scotia Richard Phillips built a fort in traditional Mi'kmaq territory at Canso, Nova Scotia in 1720, and Massachusetts Governor Samuel Shute built forts on traditional Abenaki territory at the mouth of the Kennebec River. The French claimed the same territory on the Kennebec River by building a church in the Abenaki villages of Norridgewock on the Kennebec River and a church in the Maliseet village of Medoctec on the Saint John River. These fortifications and missions escalated the conflict. By 1720, Massachusetts had placed a bounty on Râle.

In the winter of 1722, New England rangers raided Norridgewock, trying to capture Râle. While he escaped, the rangers destroyed the church and mission house. As revenge for the first raid on Norridgewock, the Mi'kmaq laid siege to the Lieutenant Governor of Nova Scotia John Doucett in May 1722 at Annapolis Royal. On June 13, 1722, in present-day Maine, the tribe and allied groups burned Brunswick at the mouth of the Kennebec, taking hostages to exchange for those of their people held in Boston. Consequently, on July 25, Shute declared war on the eastern Indians. But on January 1, 1723, Shute abruptly departed for London. He had grown disgusted with the intransigent Assembly (which controlled funding) as it squabbled with the Governor's Council over which body should conduct the war. Lieutenant-governor William Dummer assumed management of the government. Further Abenaki incursions persuaded the Assembly to act in what would be called Father Rale's War.

== Raid ==
In August 1724, a force of 208 soldiers (which split into 2 units under the commands of captains Johnson Harmon and Jeremiah Moulton) left Fort Richmond (now Richmond, Maine) in 17 whaleboats to go up the Kennebec. (Note: Johnson Harmon was known for his bloodthirsty attitude towards the Indians. In 1715, male members of the Harmon family massacred Native Americans at a pow-wow in York, Maine. The local minister, Samuel Moody, stated that God would punish the Harmons so that there would be no more males to carry on the name. Three of the four officers in command of the little troop had been captives in earlier wars. They were Captains Harmon and Moulton and Lieutenant Bean or Bane.) At Taconic Falls (now Winslow, Maine), 40 men were left to guard the boats as the troops continued on foot. On August 21, the Rangers killed Chief Bomoseen, fatally wounded his daughter, and took his wife captive. (Note: Note that Following the peace of Utrecht in April 1713, Mog, Bomoseen, Moxus, Taxous, and other chiefs concluded a peace with New England at Portsmouth, N.H., on 11–13 July.)

On August 22, 1724, Captains Jeremiah Moulton and Johnson Harmon led 200 rangers to the main Abenaki village on the Kennebec River, Norridgewock, Maine, to kill Father Sébastien Râle and destroy the settlement. On the 23rd, there were 160 Abenaki, many of whom were killed as they tried to escape. The Rangers fired on the canoes filled with families. Harmon noted that at least 50 bodies went downstream before the rangers could retrieve them for their scalps. At least 31 Abenaki chose to fight, which allowed the others to escape. Most of the defenders were killed. Lieutenant Richard Jacques killed Râle in the opening moments of the battle; Chief Mog was killed, and the rangers massacred nearly two dozen women and children. The English had casualties of two militiamen and one Nauset. (Note: The man killed, Jeremy Queach, was misidentified as a Mohawk in a contemporary history by Samuel Penhallow. However, recent research has shown he was a Nauset Indian from what is today Yarmouth, Massachusetts, on Cape Cod.) Harmon destroyed the Abenaki farms, and those who had escaped were forced to abandon their village and moved northward to the Abenaki village of St Francois (Odanak, Quebec). Many of the Indians were routed, leaving 26 warriors dead and 14 wounded. Harmon's son-in-law Lieutenant Richard Jacques scalped Father Râle. Chief Wissememet was also killed.

The soldiers mutilated Râle's body; his scalp was later redeemed in Boston with those of the other dead. The Boston authorities gave a reward for the scalps, and Harmon was promoted. Thereafter, the French and Indians claimed that the missionary died "a martyr" at the foot of a large cross set in the central square, drawing the soldiers' attention to himself to save his parishioners. The English militia claimed that he was "a bloody incendiary" shot in a cabin while reloading his flintlock. A Mohawk named Christian, who accompanied the troops, slipped back after they had departed and set the village and church ablaze.

== Aftermath ==
The 150 Abenaki survivors returned to bury the fallen before abandoning Norridgewock for St. Francis and Becancour, Quebec. Some later returned to the area. Râle was interred beneath the altar at which he had ministered to his converts. In 1833, Bishop Benedict Joseph Fenwick dedicated an 11-foot tall obelisk monument, erected by subscription, over his grave at what is today St. Sebastian's Cemetery at Old Point in Madison, Maine.
