= Jeremiah Moulton =

New England militia officer (1688-1765)

- Born: 1688; York, Massachusetts, English America
- Died: 20 July 1765 (aged 76–77); York, Massachusetts, British America
- Spouse: Hannah Ballard m. 1711

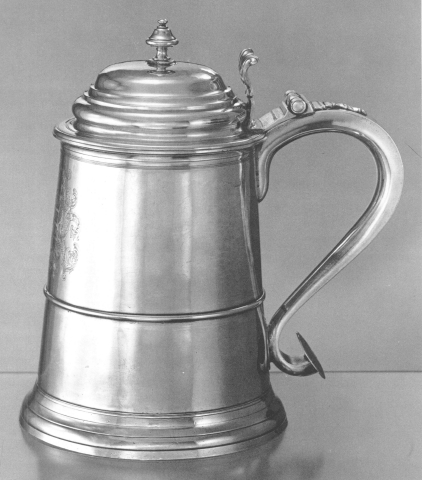
Silver Tankard given to Moulton by William Pepperrell after the Siege of Port Toulouse and Louisbourg (1745), Yale University

Jeremiah Moulton (1688–July 20, 1765) was a New England militia officer and member of the Massachusetts Council. As a boy during King William's War, Moulton's parents were killed and he was taken captive in the Raid on York.

== Early life ==
Jeremiah Moulton was born in 1688 in York, Maine as the youngest son of Joseph Moulton and Hannah Littlefield. When he was four years old, York was attacked by the French and Wabanaki Indians in what was called the Candlemas Massacre. Both his parents died in the attack; his mother was killed after being struck by a tomahawk in her skull. He survived by hiding underneath a bed.

After the attack he remained with relatives in York and learned surveying. He married Hannah Ballard of Portsmouth, New Hampshire in 1711 and together they had eight children, one of them named Jeremiah Jr. Around this time he joined the militia.

His sister also survived the attack and later married Johnson Harmon.

== Father Rale's War ==
During Father Rale's War, or Lovewell's War, then Captain Moulton and Captain Johnson Harmon led a force of 200 rangers to Norridgewock in an attempt to kill Father Sébastien Rale and stop the Native Americans from raiding British settlements. He led his men directly into the village and they succeeded in their objective winning the Battle of Norridgewock. After the war, he returned to his civilian life, remaining in the militia. He became a judge, sheriff of York County, and member of the Massachusetts Council, among other jobs.

== King George's War ==
During King George's war, Colonel Moulton commanded the Third Massachusetts Regiment, which included Private Samuel Whittemore, who later became the oldest combatant in the American Revolutionary War. He was third in command of the expedition to Louisbourg. In April 1745, he landed with New England troops at Canso and led then in the capture of St. Peters, Nova Scotia. After the conquest of the fortress, he remained in Cape Breton to aid in the occupation.

== Later Life and Death ==
He returned to York in December 1745 and shortly thereafter was appointed judge of the Probate Court. At some point after returning, he sat for an interview with Thomas Hutchinson when the latter was writing The History of the Province of Massachusetts-Bay. In 1760, Hannah died and two years later he married Mary Lord. He died on July 20, 1765 and is buried at the York Old Burying Ground, the same cemetery where many victims of the Candlemas Massacre were buried.
