= Madockawando =

Penobscot Chief during King William's War

Madockawando (born in Maine c. 1630; died 1698) was a sachem of the Penobscot, an adopted son of Assaminasqua, whom he succeeded. He led the Penobscot on the side of the French against the English during King William's War.

== Biography ==
The Penobscot lands, lying east of Penobscot River, were a part of the French colony of Acadia. The English returned this to France in the 1667 Treaty of Breda, though the English claimed that the territory between the Penobscot and the St. Croix Rivers was included in the Duke of York's patent. The Native Americans in the region were brought under French influence by Jean-Vincent d'Abbadie de Saint-Castin, known as Castin in the New England Chronicles, who was a trader who did much to gain influence with the Abenaki, Penobscot, and other local tribes. He settled among them, and married a daughter of Madockawando, a Penobscot chief.

When King Philip's confederacy entered into a state of war with the Plymouth Colony, the eastern Penobscot and the English settlers in Maine and New Hampshire became involved in war. The Penobscot people were the first among the Native Americans to sue for peace, and offered to enter into an alliance with the English. Articles were drawn and subscribed at Boston on 6 November 1676, and the peace was ratified by Madockawando. The English, however, created a pretext for renewing hostilities. The Penobscot were successful, and destroyed all English settlements in that part of Maine.

In 1678, a treaty was made at Casco, whereby the English settlers were permitted to return to their farms on the condition of paying rent to the Penobscot. The peace was kept until the territorial dispute with France was brought to an issue in 1688 by Edmund Andros, who arrived among the Penobscot in a frigate. He sacked Castin's house near the ruins of the old French fort. The Penobscot Chiefs took up the quarrel, being abundantly supplied with arms by Castin, and attacked English settlements. This was one of the catalysts for King William's War, though the larger Anglo-French conflict came about as a result for of a contest between the two nations for influence in North America. Madockawando took a prominent part in all major stages of the conflict.

When the English built Fort William Henry at Pemaquid, Madockawando hastened to Quebec to carry the intelligence to Louis de Buade de Frontenac, but divulged it to John Nelson. His messengers warned the authorities in Boston of Pierre Le Moyne d'Iberville's expedition. In 1693 the English gained Madockawando's consent to a treaty of peace, yet he was unable to persuade the chiefs who were under the influence of French Jesuit emissaries, and was compelled to recommence hostilities.

The war continued for more than a year after the Peace of Ryswick had been concluded between France and England. Meanwhile, Chief Madockawando had moved to Meductic, a Maliseet-Abenaki Indian mission village on the St. John River where he died in a smallpox epidemic in 1698.

== Memorials ==
In Castine, Maine, there was a plaque on Dyce Head Lighthouse Rd. that read:

UPON THESE HEIGHTS, in 1692, James [Thomas?] Giles [brother of John Gyles], a boy, and an Englishman, taken at Casco (Battle of Falmouth (1690)?), held in slavery by MADDOCKAWANDO for attempting to escape, were tortured by fire, compelled to eat their noses and ears and then burned to death at the stake.

This was a description of ritual torture used against enemies who were taken captive in war.
