= Winthrop Hilton =

Colonel Winthrop Hilton (c. 1671–-1710) was the highest-ranking officer in New Hampshire through King William's War and Queen Anne's War. He took on this position after natives killed Major Richard Waldron in Dover on June 27, 1689, at the outbreak of King William's War. Hilton was the second son of Edward Hilton and nephew of Gov. Joseph Dudley.

During Queen Anne's War, Major Hilton joined the expedition of Col. Benjamin Church in May 1704, and was gone all summer, marching as far as the Penobscot River and participating in the Raid on Grand Pré.

== Raid on Norridgewock (1705) ==
In retaliation for the Northeast Coast Campaign (1703), there was a bounty put on Father Sebastian Rale. Finding the village of Norridgewock deserted in the winter of 1705 because its occupants, including Rale, had been warned of an impending attack, Colonel Hilton ordered 275 New England militiamen under his command to burn the village and the church.

On 1 July 1706, natives raided Hilton's home in Newfields, killing six of the ten men working the fields and taking two prisoner. In January 1707, at Casco (specifically Black Point, Maine, near present-day Portland), Hilton ambushed 18 natives as they slept and massacred all but one. Later that year, Hilton also participated in the Siege of Port Royal.

== Raid on Epping (1710) ==
Natives ambushed Hilton and his company at Epping, New Hampshire, on June 23, 1710, killing him and two of his men, and taking more prisoner. He is buried at Newfields, New Hampshire, at the Hilton Burial Ground.

== See also ==
- Charles Frost (military officer)
- New Hampshire Historical Marker No. 272: Hilton Family of Newfields
- Richard Waldron

== Sources ==
- Biographical Sketch of Winthrop Hilton via Google Books
