= Sébastien Rale =

French Jesuit missionary (1657–1724)

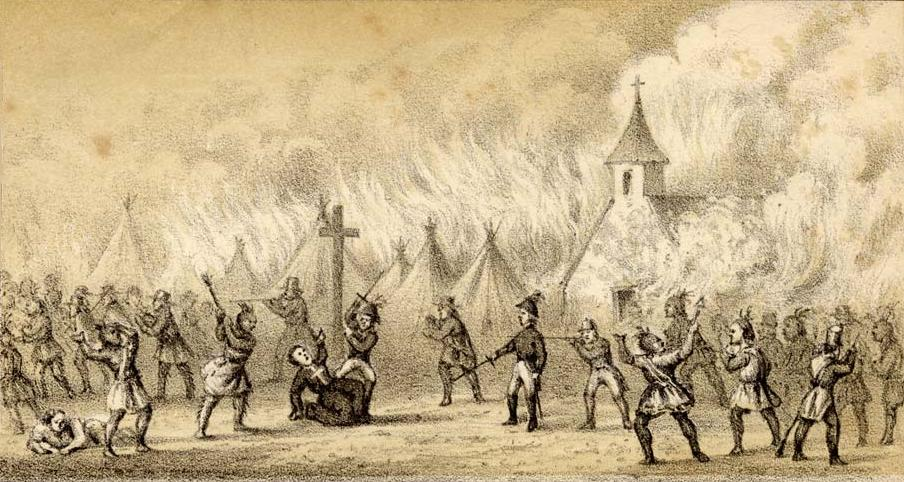
A lithograph depicting Rale's death during Dummer's War

Sébastien Rale (French pronunciation: [sebastjɛ̃ ʁal]; also Racle, Râle, Rasle, Rasles, and Sebastian Rale; January 20, 1657 – August 23, 1724) was a French Jesuit missionary and lexicographer who preached amongst the Abenaki and encouraged their resistance to British colonization during the early 18th century. This encouragement culminated in Dummer's War (1722–1725), where Rale was killed by a group of New England militiamen. Rale also worked on an Abenaki-French dictionary during his time in North America.

== Early years ==
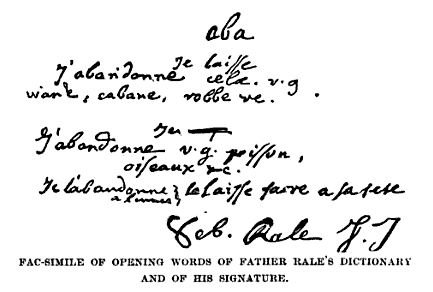
Opening words in Rale's dictionary

Rale was born in Pontarlier, France and studied in Dijon. In 1675, he joined the Society of Jesus at Dole and taught Greek and rhetoric at Nîmes. He volunteered for the American missions in 1689 and came to the Americas in a party led by Louis de Buade de Frontenac, the Governor General of New France. His first missionary work was at an Abenaki village in Saint Francois, near Quebec City. He then spent two years with the Illiniwek Indians at Kaskaskia.

== Queen Anne's War ==
In 1694, Rale was sent to direct the Abenaki mission at Norridgewock, Maine on the Kennebec River. He made his headquarters there and erected a church in 1698. The New England colonists were suspicious of a French missionary arriving in the midst of a tribe that was already hostile, anticipating that the Frenchman would do his best to stoke hostility towards the colonists.

Queen Anne's War pitted New France against New England, fighting to control the region. Massachusetts Governor Joseph Dudley arranged a conference with tribal representatives at Casco Bay in 1703 to propose that they remain neutral. However, a party of the Norridgewock tribe joined a larger force of French and Indians commanded by Alexandre Leneuf de Beaubassin to attack Wells, Maine in the Northeast Coast Campaign. New England colonists suspected Father Rale of inciting the tribe against them. However, French minister Pontchartrain also wrote to Rale's Jesuit superior because he suspected Rale of "being lukewarm about the war".

Governor Dudley put a price on Rale's head. In the winter of 1705, 275 New England militiamen were dispatched under the command of Colonel Winthrop Hilton to seize Rale. The priest was warned in time, however, and escaped into the woods with his papers, but the militia burned the village and church. Rale wrote to his nephew:

It is needful to control the imagination of the savages, too easily distracted, I pass few working days without making them a short exhortation for the purpose of inspiring a horror of the vices to which their tendency is strongest, and for strengthening them in the practice of some virtue.… My advice always shapes their resolutions.

— Sébastien Rale, Collections and Proceedings of the Maine Historical Society, Volume 2; Volume 4

The French induced in the local Indians a deep distrust of British intentions—and they accomplished this despite Abenaki dependence on British trading posts to exchange furs for other necessities.

=== Treaty of Utrecht ===
The Peace of Utrecht brought an end to ongoing conflicts in North America in 1713, and the Indians swore allegiance to the British Crown at the Treaty of Portsmouth. It is most likely, however, that the Indians had no idea of what the treaty actually stipulated. Meanwhile, the boundary remained contested between New France and New England. The British Crown claimed all lands extending to the St. George River, but most Abenaki inhabiting them were sympathetic to the French and to the Catholic Church. In August 1717, Governor Samuel Shute met with tribal representatives of Norridgewock and other Abenaki bands in Georgetown, Maine on a coastal island, warning that cooperation with the French would bring them "utter ruin and destruction". Kennebec sachem Wiwurna objected to colonists establishing settlements on the land and to their constructing forts; he claimed sovereign control of the land, while Shute reasserted rights of the colonists to expand into the territory. New England settlers continued to settle on the Kennebec River, and the Wabanakis responded by stealing livestock. Governor-general of New France Vaudreuil wrote in 1720: "Father Rale continues to incite Indians of the mission at [Norridgewock] not to allow the English to spread over their lands." Shute protested the presence of Rale at Norridgewock and demanded that he be removed. The Wabanakis refused in July 1721 and demanded that hostages be released (who had been given in surety during earlier negotiations).

Chief Taxous died, and his successor was Wissememet who advocated peace with the Colonists, offering beaver skins as reparation for past damages, and four hostages to guarantee none in the future. Rale, however, continued to stir up individuals within the tribe, urging armed resistance. He declared: "Any treaty with the governor… is null and void if I do not approve it, for I give them so many reasons against it that they absolutely condemn what they have done."

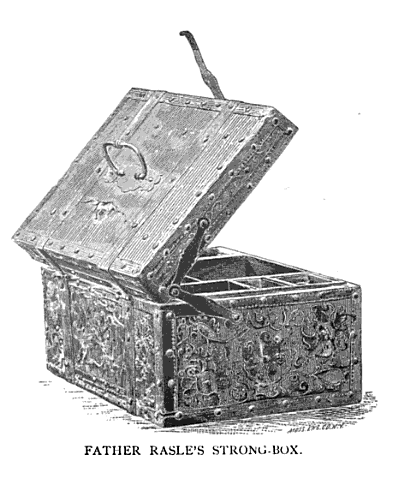
Strongbox belonging to Rale (Note Rasle spelling).

Rale wrote to Vaudreuil for reinforcements, and 250 Abenaki warriors from near Quebec arrived at Norridgewock, reliably hostile to the Colonists. On July 28, 1721, over 250 Indians landed at Georgetown in war paint and flying French colors from a flotilla of 90 canoes. With them were Rale and Superior of the Missions Pierre de la Chasse. They delivered a letter which demanded that the Colonial settlers leave or Rale and his Indians would kill them and burn their houses, together with their livestock. A reply was expected within two months. The Colonists immediately stopped selling gunpowder, ammunition, and food to the Abenaki. Then 300 soldiers under the command of Colonel Thomas Westbrook surrounded Norridgewock to capture Rale in January 1722, while most of the tribe were away hunting, but he was forewarned and escaped into the forest. His strongbox was found among the possessions that he left behind, however, with a hidden compartment containing letters implicating him as an agent of the French government and promising Indians enough ammunition to drive the Colonists from their settlements. Also, inside was his three-volume Abenaki-French dictionary, which was presented to the library at Harvard College.

== Sebastien Rale and the Abenaki ==
Rale was tasked with one of the longest and most eventful periods of priesthood in this area of the New World. Rale devoted himself to his mission work and began to study the Abenaki dialect to be a more effective priest. In addition, he also studied the Algonquin dialect in order to run a mission in Illinois for a few years after leaving Kennebec for a short time. In 1694 Father Rale was sent to the Kennebec mission in old Acadia. This was the westernmost mission in the area and Father Rale was the first permanent pastor in lower Kennebec.

Father Rale showed compassion for the Abenaki people, in a letter to his brother which consisted of a long poem he said, "My throat is white and it bleeds" and "I shook the chapel bell in tears/ And cried revenge!" during Father Rale's war facing the settlers taking the side of the tribe. At a time when many French people and Jesuit priests like Father Rale himself believed the Abenaki people were wild beasts in need of civilization, Rale expressed no such sentiments; eventually becoming a martyr to the Abenaki by dying during his campaign to help them resist the encroachment of New England settlers on their lands.

The Jesuit mission in Abenaki territory had existed since 1632, many years before Rale had begun his mission there. The mission was created by the French around the same period that they gained control of Quebec. Rale was put in charge to keep the Abenaki from moving, and to have a more sedentary lifestyle that revolved around Christianity. Many people in St. Lawrence looked toward the Abenaki land to help with the fur trade as their land was to the south of them.

The Abenaki people’s land was of high priority for the settlers in the area because of fur trade implications. Before Rale got to Norridgewock the native people there had signed a treaty making them British subjects with very little idea of what this meant. This made the French come after Father Rale and his group of Abenaki in search of supplies needed to further the fur trade.

The native people in Norridgewock were said by the New England settlers to have verbally proclaimed themselves at their will but Father Rale denied this had ever happened and kept loyalties to the French. Throughout his life and mission Rale remained a beloved priest of the people of the area and is still thought to be a martyr as many Abenaki believe he gave his life to help them resist the encroachment of settlers.

The colonists asked the Abenaki to remain neutral near the beginning of the French and Indian War but because of their religious ties with the French they could not fight against them. Father Rale was present at the meeting on behalf of the native people and stated that the Abenaki would be "ready to take up the hatchet against the English whenever he gave them the order".

In a 1722 letter sent to a nephew from Norridgewock, Rale said that "my nourishment is nothing but Indian corn, which is pounded and of which I make every day a kind of porridge that I cook with water. The only relish (adoncissement) that I add to it is in mingling a little (maple) sugar.” Rale's confessed avoidance of the meat and fish eaten by the members of his Abenaki flock places him among the tradition of ascetic Christian vegetarians.

== Dummer's War ==
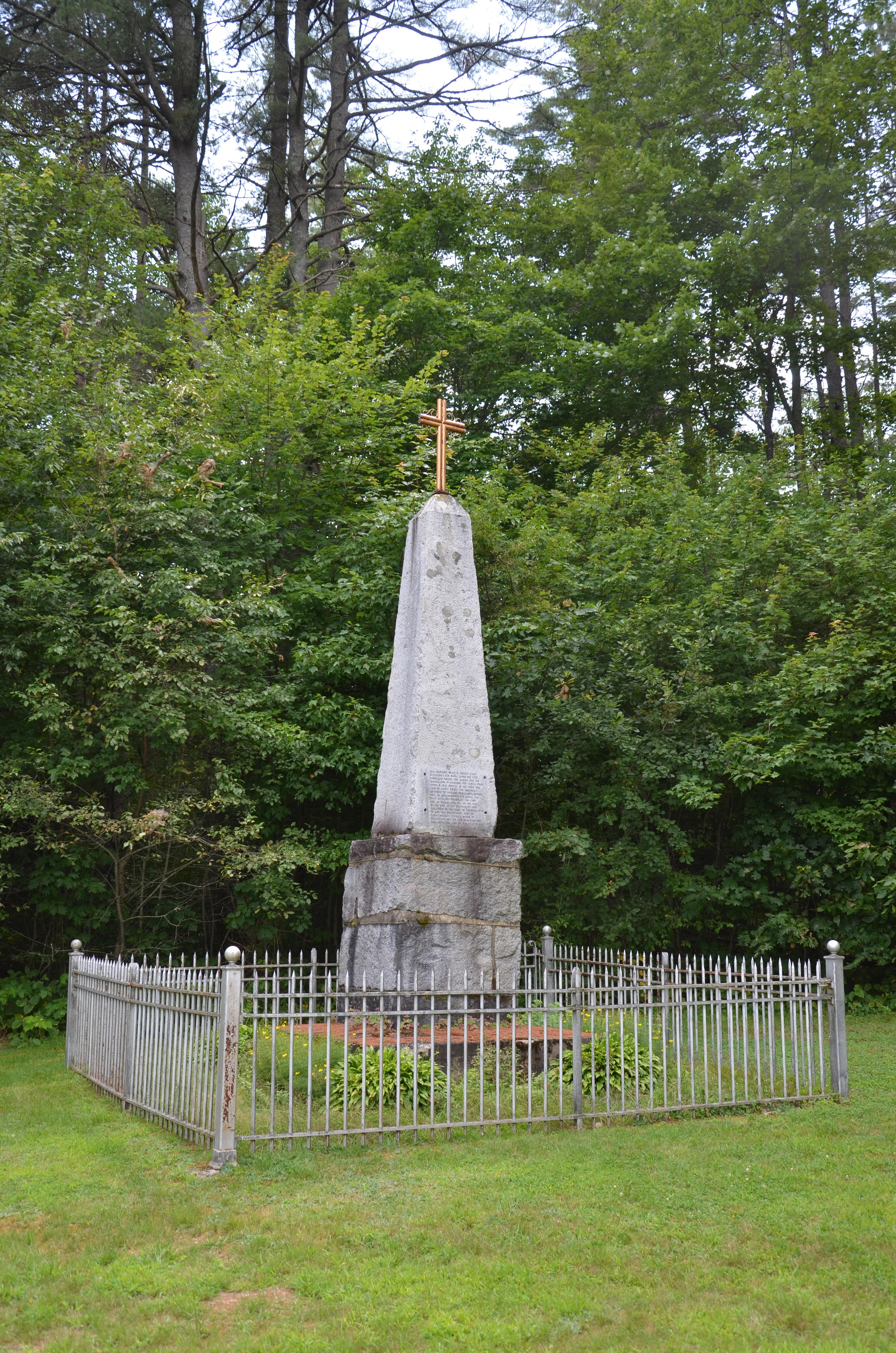
The memorial monument for Father Sébastien Rale in Madison, Maine

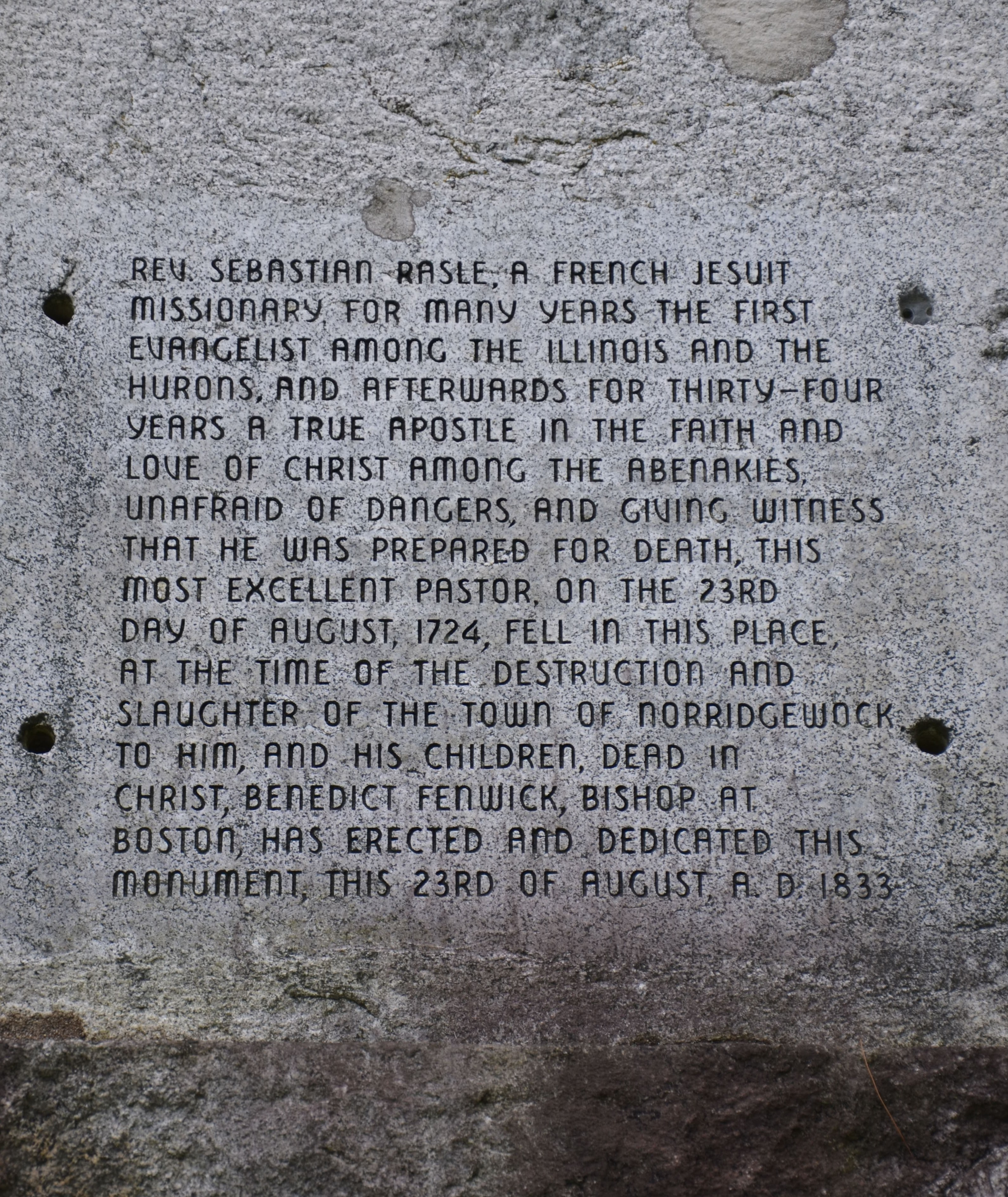
Inscription on the memorial

In response to the raid on Norridgewock, on June 13, 1722, the Abenaki tribe and its auxiliaries burned Fort George at the mouth of the Kennebec, taking hostages, most of whom were later released, to exchange for those held in Boston. Samuel Shute then declared war on the eastern Indians on July 25; but he then abruptly departed for London on January 1, 1723. He had grown disgusted with the intransigent Assembly which controlled funding, as it squabbled with the Governor's Council over which body should conduct the war. Lieutenant-governor William Dummer assumed management of the government, and further Abenaki incursions persuaded the Assembly to act in what was called Dummer's War.

=== Battle of Norridgewock ===
In August 1724, a force of 208 New England militiamen left Fort Richmond in 17 whaleboats (now Richmond, Maine) and rowed up the Kennebec. These split into two units under the commands of captains Johnson Harmon and Jeremiah Moulton. At Taconic Falls (now Winslow, Maine), 40 men were left to guard the boats as the troops continued on foot. On August 23, 1724 (N. S.), the expedition came upon the village of Norridgewock.

Father Rale was sent to North America with the fur traders and Fishermen and was said to have been the reason the Abenaki people were planning to help the French forces in their conflicts against the British in the Americas. This began in 1721 when Rale demanded that the New Englanders return their Abenaki hostages which in turn made them stop trading gunpowder and other supplies to the Abenaki. Then later in 1722 Col. Thomas Westbrook decided to raid Father Rale's mission to capture him but he escaped. This raid to capture Rale was a failure but they obtained letters that suggested he was working for the French colonial authorities in New France. To revenge this raid, the Abenaki's burned Brunswick but in Father Rale's words, "they took care to not harm the settlers, but to destroy their property" Later in August 1724 New England militiamen, with Mohawk Indians fighting alongside them, destroyed Norridgewock- killing at least 100 Abenakis and Father Rale himself.

Rale's scalp and those of the other dead were presented to the authorities in Boston, who had offered a bounty for the scalps of hostile Indians. Harmon was promoted. Thereafter, two versions of Rale's death emerged. The French and Indians claiming he died "a martyr" at the foot of a large cross set in the central square, drawing the soldiers' attention to himself to save his parishioners. The New England militamen said that he was "a bloody incendiary" shot in a cabin while reloading his flintlock musket.

The 150 Abenaki survivors returned to bury the fallen before abandoning Norridgewock for Canada. Rale was buried beneath an altar at the settlement. In 1833, Bishop Benedict Joseph Fenwick dedicated an 11-foot tall obelisk monument inscribed and erected by subscription over his grave in St. Sebastian's Cemetery at Old Point in Madison, Maine.

Francis Parkman described Rale as:

Fearless, resolute, enduring; boastful, sarcastic, often bitter and irritating; a vehement partisan; apt to see things not as they are, but as he wished them to be… yet no doubt sincere in his opinions and genuine in zeal; hating the English more than he loved the Indians; calling himself their friend, yet using them as instruments of worldly policy, to their danger and final ruin. In considering the ascription of martyrdom, it is to be remembered that he did not die because he was an apostle of the faith, but because he was an active agent of the Canadian government.

— Francis Parkman, A Half Century of Conflict

== Gallery ==
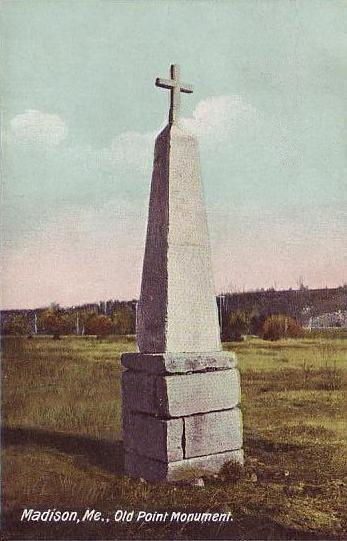
Grave of Sebastien Rale in 1911

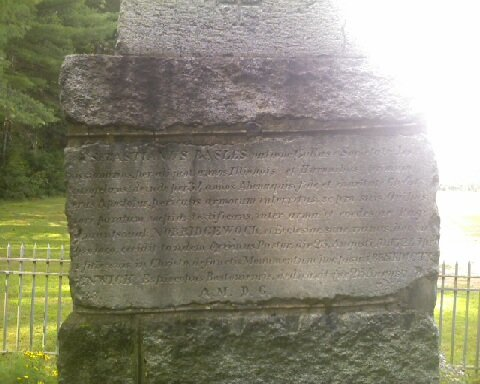
Inscription on monument (Latin)

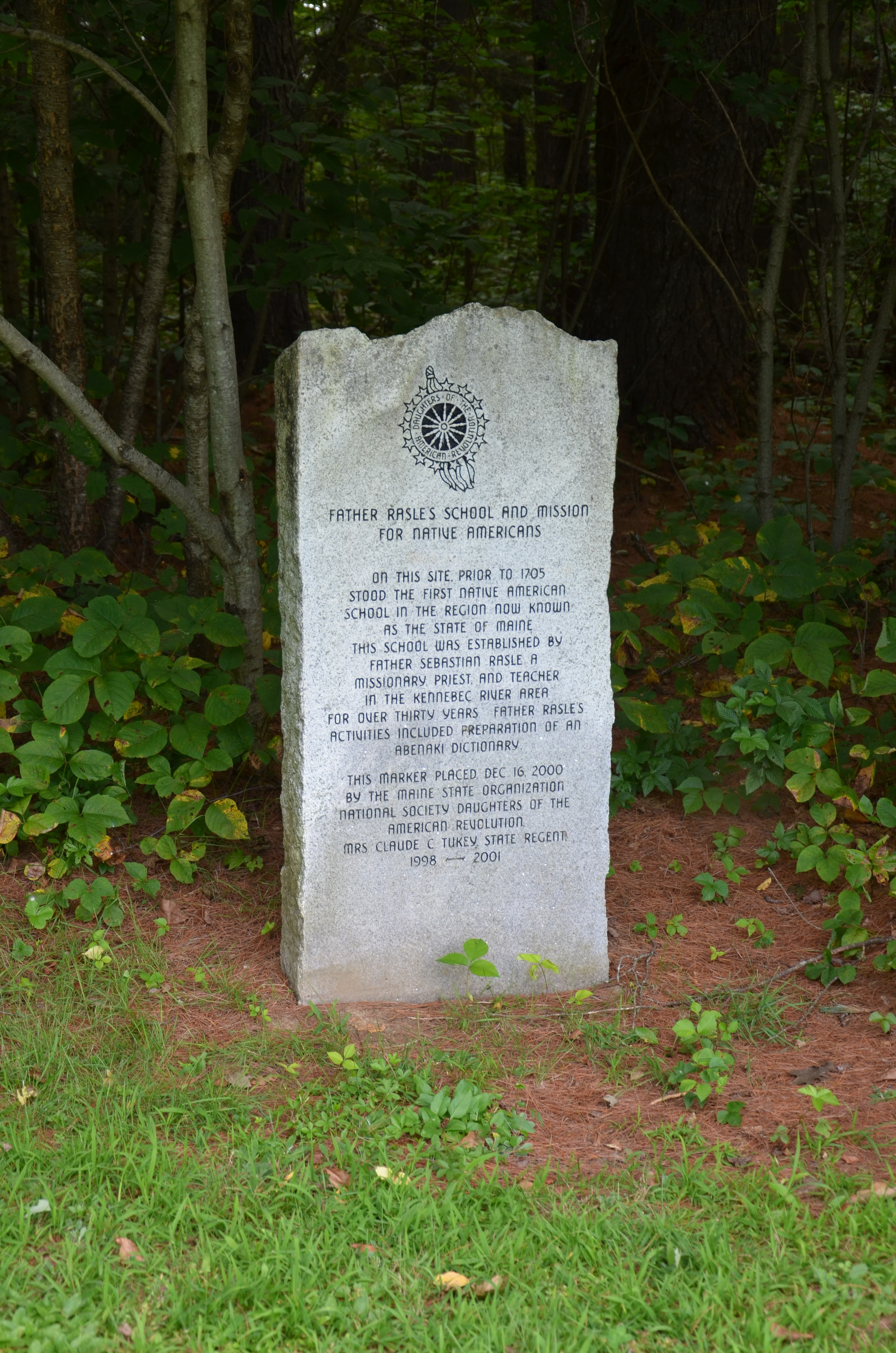
A monument at Father Rale's grave memorializing his work.

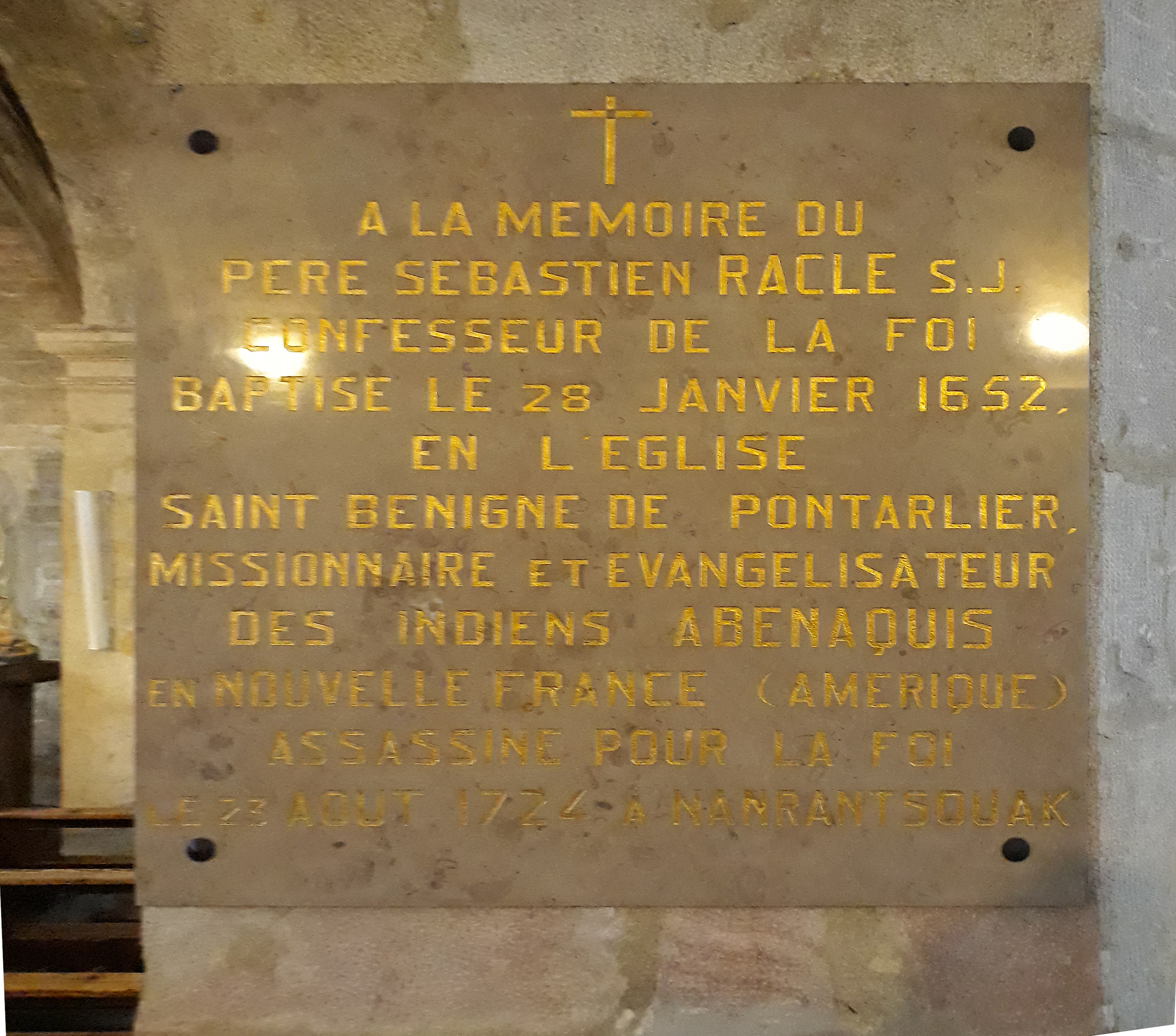
Memorial plaque in holy Bénigne church, Pontarlier.

== Bibliography ==
- John Fiske, New England and New France, 1902, Houghton, Mifflin & Company, Boston, Massachusetts
- Parkman, Francis (1920) [1892]. A Half-century of Conflict. France and England in North America, Part Sixth. Vol. I. Little, Brown.
- Herbert Milton Sylvester, Indian Wars of New England, Volume III, 1910, W. B. Clarke, Boston, Massachusetts
- Schuyler, H.C. "The Apostle of the Abnakis: Father Sebastian Rale, S.J. (1657-1724)". The Catholic Historical Review. 1 (2): 164–174.
