= Raid on Salmon Falls =

Action of King William's War

Coordinates: 43.2705°N 70.7781°W

- Part of King William's War
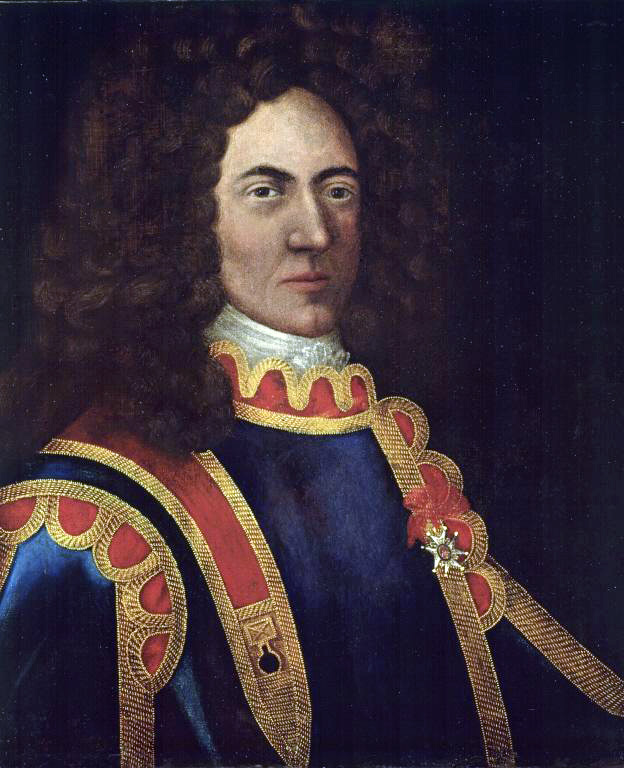
- Jean-Baptiste Hertel de Rouville
Date	March 27, 1690
Location	Salmon Falls (present-day Berwick, Maine)
Result	Acadian and Wabanaki Confederacy victory

Belligerents
(New France) Acadia; Abenaki; Mi'kmaq; Maliseet	New England

Commanders and leaders
Joseph-François Hertel de la Fresnière; Jean-Baptiste Hertel de Rouville; Chief Wahowa; Chief Assacumbuit	

Strength
Unknown	Unknown

Casualties and losses
Unknown	34 killed, 54 captured

The Raid on Salmon Falls (March 27, 1690) captured and destroyed the English settlement of Salmon Falls (present-day Berwick, Maine) during King William's War. It involved Joseph-François Hertel de la Fresnière, his son Jean-Baptiste Hertel de Rouville and Norridgewock Abnaki chief Wahowa.

== Raid ==
The village was plundered and burnt. Thirty-four men were killed and fifty-four people, mostly women and children, were carried away captive to Canada. Militia mustered from Portsmouth gave chase but were driven off in a skirmish later that day. Hertel then continued to raid present-day Portland, Maine.

The attackers' original intent was to target the home of Edward Tyng, father of Edward Tyng, at Fort Loyal, but changed plans and attacked Salmon Falls.

== See also ==
- Military history of the Mi’kmaq Warriors
