= Hannah Swarton =

Colonial Maine Puritan mother

- Born: Joana Hibbert or Hibbard; 1651 (baptized on 9 March 1651); Salem, Massachusetts
- Died: 12 October 1708 (aged 56–57); Beverly, Massachusetts
- Known for: Captivity by Native Americans and French Canadians
- Spouse: John Swarton (died 1690)
- Children: Children: John, Mary, Samuel, Jasper
- Parent(s): John and Anne Hibbart

Hannah Swarton (1651 - 12 October 1708), née Joana Hibbert/Hibbard, was a New England colonial pioneer who was captured by Abenaki Indians and held prisoner for 5 1/2 years, first in an Abenaki community and later in the home of a French family in Quebec. She was eventually freed and told her story to Cotton Mather, who used it as a moral lesson in several of his works.

== Early life ==
Joana Hibbert/Hibbard was the daughter of Robert and Joan Hibbard, baptized on 9 March 1651 at Salem, Massachusetts.

She married John Swarton in Beverly, Massachusetts on 8 January 1670 or 1671. They had five children in Beverly, Massachusetts:

- Mary, died on 14 September 1674
- Samuel, baptized 8 November 1674
- Mary, baptized 17 October 1675
- John, baptized 22 July 1677
- Jasper, baptized 14 June 1685 in the First Parish Church in Beverly.

In 1687, John Swarton of Beverly received a 50-acre land grant in North Yarmouth. In his petition he said he was from the channel island of Jersey and had fought with Charles II in Flanders in the Anglo-Spanish War (1654–1660). The family moved from Beverly to Casco Bay in 1689, and were visited there later that year by Benjamin Church.

== Captivity, 1690-1695 ==
=== Capture ===
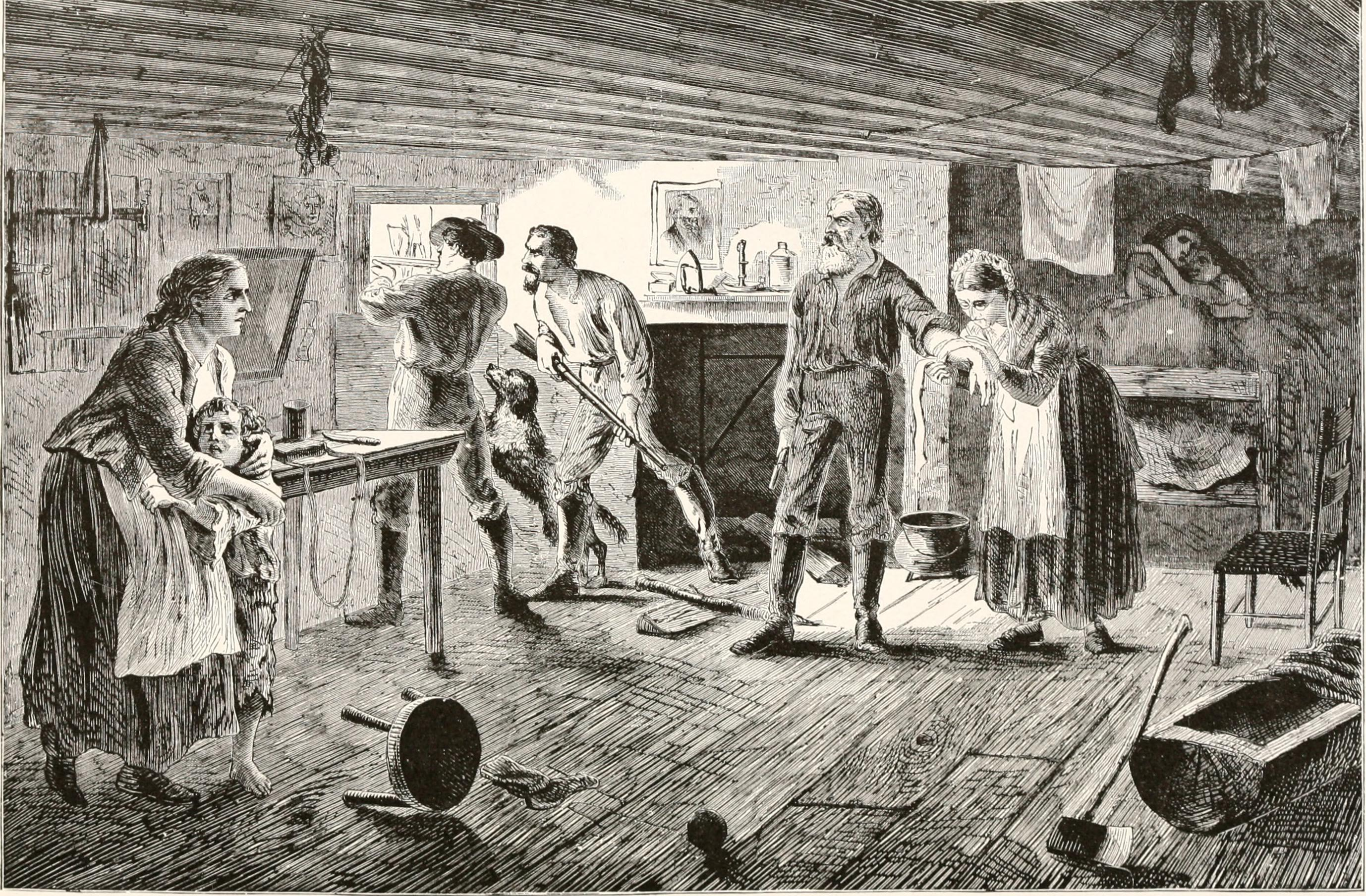
New England settlers defending a garrison house from attack by French and Native American forces.

During King William's War, Louis de Buade de Frontenac, the Governor General of New France, launched a campaign to drive the English from the settlements east of Falmouth, Maine.

On 16 May 1690, the fortified settlement on Casco Bay was attacked by a war party of 50 French-Canadian soldiers led by Jean-Vincent d'Abbadie de Saint-Castin, about 50 Abenaki warriors from Canada, a contingent of French militia led by Joseph-François Hertel de la Fresnière, and 300-400 additional natives from Maine, including some Penobscots under the leadership of Madockawando. Fort Loyal was attacked at the same time. About 75 men in the Casco settlement fought for four days before surrendering on 20 May, on condition of safe passage to the nearest English town. Instead, most of the men, including John Swarton, were killed, and the surviving settlers were taken captive, including Hannah Swarton and her children Samuel, Mary, John, and Jasper Swarton. One source says that of over 200 people in the fort, only 10 or 12 survived and were taken into captivity.

=== Life with the Indians ===
Hannah Swarton's narrative describes the hardships she experienced as a prisoner among the Indians. She was separated from her children at Norridgewock, Maine and later learned that her oldest son Samuel had been killed about two months after being taken prisoner. She never saw or heard of her son John again after they were separated, and she had only sporadic contact with her daughter Mary for the first three years of her captivity. She was reunited with her son Jasper in late 1695.

From May 1690, until February 1691, she traveled on "many weary journeys" with the Indians through the wilderness of northern Maine. She describes being starved and forced to work in the snow without adequate clothing. Hannah's native mistress was a Catholic who had been raised in an English community at Black Point (present-day Scarborough, Maine). She told Hannah that her captivity was punishment for her rejection of Catholicism. Another English captive, John York, lived with Hannah until he became too weak to work and the Abenakis killed him.

Hannah believed that her captivity and suffering were divine punishment inflicted on her for her sins, a common theme in Puritan literature of the time. In particular, Hannah identifies leaving "public worship and the Ordinances of God" by moving from Beverly, Massachusetts, to Casco Bay, a rural community "where there was no Church, or Minister of the Gospel," as a transgression, even though she probably had little choice in the matter. She also remained certain that she would eventually be delivered and would afterwards be inspired to "declare the Works of the Lord," as payment for her freedom.

=== Life in Quebec ===
In February 1691, the Indians she was living with camped in Canada near the home of a French family, and Hannah was sent to beg food from them. They gave her food and treated her kindly, and Hannah asked her Abenaki master if she would be allowed to spend the night in a French home, which he agreed to. The lady of the household allowed Hannah to sleep in front of the fireplace, and the next day she brought a local innkeeper and an Englishman, who told Hannah that he, too, had been a prisoner. The two men invited Hannah to come with them to Quebec (probably Quebec City, as Quebec did not yet exist as a province), where they said they would arrange for her to be ransomed from the Indians. Hannah agreed and was taken to the home of "the Lord Intendant, Monsieur Le ...onant, who was Chief Judge, and the Second to the Governour." (Note: If this was the Intendant of New France, it was probably Jean Bochart de Champigny (1643-1720), who served as Intendant from 1686 to 1702. The Intendant had several functions, including judge, and was effectively the second most powerful administrator in the government of New France, next to the Governor General. Bochart de Champigny was described as "a good man, humane, and well liked.")

He had her treated at a local hospital (probably the Hôtel-Dieu de Québec) and his wife paid a ransom to Hannah's Indian master. (Although it was common at the time for the French to "buy" English prisoners from the Indians, the French later discouraged this practice.) He then employed Hannah as a housekeeper, although she was, in effect, a slave. She was fed and clothed well, but was subjected to pressure to convert to Catholicism, which she resisted. Hannah states in her narrative that her French family threatened to have her sent to France, where she would be burned as a heretic, but Hannah continued to refuse to convert, arguing with the "Nuns, Priests, and Friars" whom she met at church, using quotations from scripture. Hannah was forced to attend mass regularly until her mistress decided that she was not going to convert, and thereafter did not require her to go to church.

During her stay in Quebec, Hannah encountered other English prisoners including Edward Tyng and John Alden III (son of John Alden Jr.). Another English captive, 12-year-old Margaret Gould Stilson, was also a servant in the same household. Eventually she was forbidden contact with other English captives except for Margaret Stilson.

== Return to New England ==
In November 1695, Matthew Cary went to Quebec under the auspices of the Province of Massachusetts Bay, with "Permission and Passport given by Count Frontenac," Governor General of New France, to bring back English people held there as prisoners, by boat to Boston and New York. In exchange, "neer a hundred prisoners" held by English authorities were being returned to Canada. The list of 22 English captives redeemed from "Qubek" by Matthew Cary in October 1695 includes "Johana Swarton of York" and her son "Jesp'r Swarton, boy of Cascow," as well as Margaret Stilson. Her daughter, "Mary Swarton, gerl of Cascow," is on the list of "thos remaining Still in the hands of the french at Canada." "Hannah Swarton widdow" is recorded as being "admitted to our communion" at the First Church in Beverly, Massachusetts on 15 November 1695. She is listed as "Wid. [widow] Swarton" among the "Brethren and Sisters of Beverly Church" on September 13, 1705.

Hannah's daughter Mary Swarton chose to remain in Canada, where she had already converted to Catholicism, had been re-baptized on 20 February 1695, and was renamed "Marie Souart, daughter of the late Jean Souart and Anne Souart." In 1697 she married Jean Lehait (John Lahey), an Irishman and also a former captive, and became a French citizen in May, 1710. Mary lived for the rest of her life in Montreal.

== Narrative ==
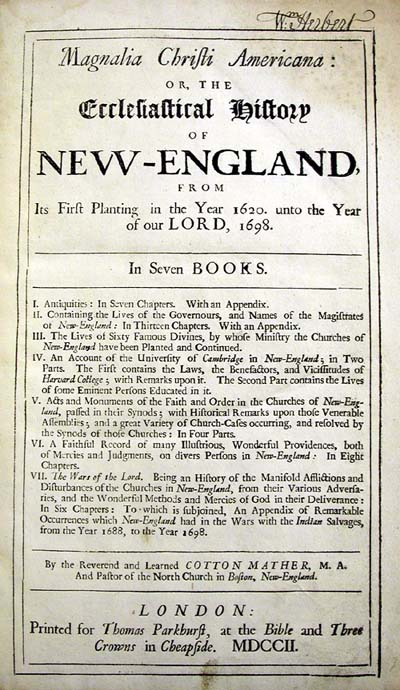
Title page of Cotton Mather's Magnalia Christi Americana (1702) in which he published an expanded version of Hannah Swarton's narrative.

After she and her son Jasper returned to New England in November 1695, Hannah Swarton gave an account of her captivity (possibly dictated), in the form of a narrative that was published in 1697 by Cotton Mather. Swarton's story was heavily embellished by Mather, who added numerous biblical references, but many of the details of her experiences appear authentic.

Cotton Mather's sermon of 6 May 1697 was published as an appendix to his Humiliations Follow'd With Deliverances and includes the stories of Hannah Swarton and Hannah Duston. It was republished in expanded form in Magnalia Christi Americana, a 1702 book by Mather. Mather's appendix to the sermon, A Narrative of Hannah Swarton, Containing a Great Many Wonderful Passages, Relating to her Captivity and Deliverance, is clearly Mather's work, in which he employs a woman's voice to emphasize the importance of remaining active in the church and mindful of Puritan values, in imitation of his father Increase Mather, who in 1682 published A Narrative of the Captivity and Restoration of Mrs. Mary Rowlandson, the captivity narrative of Mary Rowlandson.

Mather emphasizes the dangers of living in an "ungospelized plantation", a reference to communities in rural Maine without an ordained minister, and which were prone to French (Catholic) influence. Swarton is therefore depicted as a sinner, but one who has atoned, and has been redeemed and returned to grace.

In his diary entry for 15 November 1695, Mather writes:

"A Discourse which I had uttered at the Lecture of Boston, the last Spring, Expressed the Use that All should make of the terrible Disasters wherewith some are afflicted. Unto this I added a Collection of terrible and barbarous Things undergone by some of our English Captives in the Hands of the Eastern Indians. And I annexed hereunto, a memorable Narrative of a good Woman, who relates in a very Instructive Manner, the Story of her own Captivity and Deliverance. I thought that by exposing these things to the Public, I might very much promote the general Repentance."

Mather uses the scene in which Swarton, a poorly-educated frontier woman, engages in a lively scriptural debate with the French attempting to convert her to Catholicism, to illustrate theological differences between English Protestantism and Catholicism, as a means of educating Mather's audience. Protestant and Catholic populations were in close contact across North America, and pressure to convert mirrored political and economic influences affecting these largely uneducated, agricultural communities. For women in particular, Mather felt it necessary to keep them from being swayed by males who held some leverage over them, such as priests, landlords, administrators, or employers, and who might use threats to coerce women into conversion. Hannah Swarton's resistance to the pressure from her French masters is exhibited as a prime example of loyalty to her Puritan faith, and has been referred to as "passive forbearance in the face of adversity."

Nonetheless, Mather diminishes his own narrator by dismissing her intellect and memory: "But it's bootless for me, a poor woman, to acquaint the world with what arguments I used, if I could now remember them; and many of them are slipt out of my memory."

Mather published Swarton's narrative together with that of Hannah Duston, however Duston's account became better-known as a story of revenge against Native Americans, popular at a time when westward expansion of European settlers brought them into violent conflict with Indians already living in areas where new settlements were being established. Mather depicts Duston as actively ending her captivity by killing her captors and escaping, although he avoided the moral problem raised by Duston's murder of six Indian children. Swarton makes no attempt to escape, but shows endurance in her faith and willingness to recognize and atone for her sins.

== Death ==
Hannah Swarton died on 12 October 1708, in Beverly, Massachusetts at the age of 57.

== See also ==
- Cotton Mather
- Hannah Duston
- Captivity narrative
- Battle of Fort Loyal
