= History of Portland =

History of Portland may refer to:

- History of Portland, Maine
- History of Portland, Oregon
