= Sarnacki =

Sarnacki is a surname. Notable people with the surname include:

- Maciej Sarnacki (born 1987), Polish judoka
- Zoe Sarnacki (1991-2009), American murder victim from Maine
