= Portland Tram =

Portland Tram may refer to:

- The Portland Aerial Tram, an aerial cableway in Portland, Oregon, USA
- The Portland Streetcar, a tramway or tram system (British English) also located in Portland, Oregon

== See also ==
- Portland Vintage Trolley, which used vintage-style tramcars
- Railroad history of Portland, Maine#Street cars – history of trams (streetcars) in Portland, Maine
