= Shadrach Walton =

American military officer, judge and politician (1658-1741)

- Born: 1658; New Castle, New Hampshire, British America
- Died: October 3, 1741 (aged 82–83); Portsmouth, New Hampshire, British America
- Known for: Commanding a regiment during the siege of Port Royal 1710
- Spouse: Mary Nutter
- Children: Benjamin, George, Elizabeth, Mary, Abigail, Sarah

Shadrach Walton (1658 – 3 October 1741) was an American military officer, judge and politician in the Province of New Hampshire. He was a resident of Somersworth, New Hampshire.

== Military and administrative career ==
Walton commanded Fort William and Mary before 1684, and again from 1697 to 1708. He was appointed ensign in 1690, when New Hampshire and Massachusetts were reunited. He was a selectman of Portsmouth town from 1688 to 1692. He served as a judge of the Court of Common Pleas from 1695-1698, and again 1716-1733. He commanded the New Hampshire provincial troops during the siege of Port Royal 1710, and commanded a combined regiment of New Hampshire and Rhode Island troops during the Quebec Expedition 1711. He was appointed by mandamus a member of the provincial council in 1716, on which he served until 1733.

== Biography ==
In 1682 Walton's property and his father's inn were the victims of a "stone-throwing devil" that harassed them in a series of poltergeist-like events. Lithobolia, a narrative of the case, was published 1698 in London.

In 1685 Walton's father deeded him two houses, a brewery, livestock, and 200 acres of land.

During King William's War, Walton led an expedition in 1690 to relieve Fort Loyal, Maine under siege from a French and Wabanaki force, but arrived too late to save the inhabitants from the massacre of Falmouth.

In 1697, Walton appeared before the Board of Trade in London where he claimed that since Massachusetts was not able to defend New Hampshire, and New Hampshire men were better forest fighters, there was no advantage for New Hampshire to be joined with Massachusetts.

After the fall of Port Royal in 1710, Walton led a force from New Hampshire on a search and destroy mission against hostiles along the coast of Maine, and managed to kill a small number of Native Americans. In 1711 he led two companies in a similar operation against the Western Abenaki of today's Vermont, but failed to make contact with them.

During Dummer's War Walton commanded a two hundred men force, sent to the frontier in Maine. He then participated in the 1726 peace negotiations with the Penobscot and their allies.
