= Bar Harbor Express =

Seasonal passenger train in Maine, US

Overview
- Service type: Inter-city rail
- Status: Discontinued
- Locale: Mid-Atlantic (United States), Northeastern United States
- First service: 1902
- Last service: Labor Day, 1960
- Former operators: Pennsylvania Railroad; New Haven Railroad; Boston and Maine Railroad; Maine Central Railroad

Route
- Termini: Washington, D.C. Ellsworth, Maine
- Service frequency: Three days a week, summer service only
- Train number: 84; 85

On-board services
- Seating arrangements: no coaches between Philadelphia and Portland
- Sleeping arrangements: sections, roomettes, single and double bedrooms, compartments
- Catering facilities: Dining car
- Observation facilities: Parlor car

The Bar Harbor Express was a seasonal passenger train which served the resort areas around Bar Harbor, Maine, in the United States. It was a joint venture of the New York, New Haven and Hartford Railroad, the Maine Central Railroad and the Boston and Maine Railroad (B&M).

== History ==
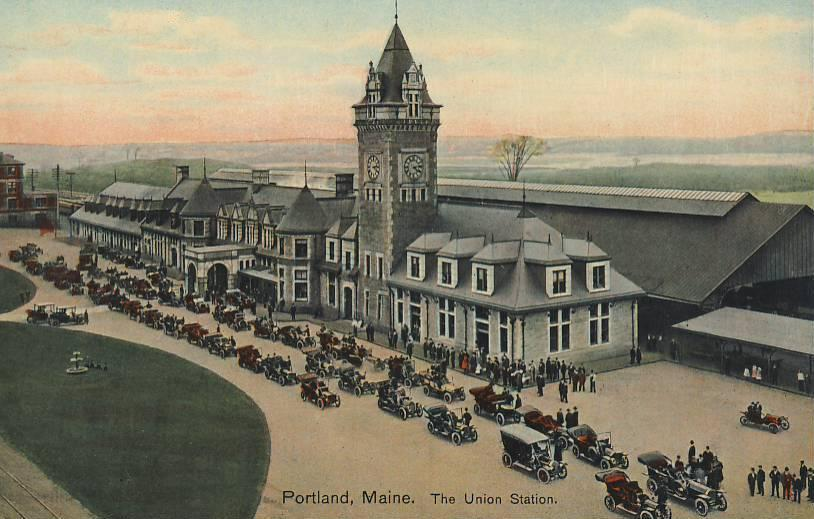
Union Station in Portland, Maine

The Bar Harbor Express began in 1902 with its southern terminus in New York. Trains ran north to Springfield, Massachusetts, over the New Haven, where they were handed off to the Boston and Albany Railroad (B&A), which carried them to Worcester. From Worcester the B&M hauled them to Union Station in Portland, Maine. From Portland the Maine Central hauled the cars to their final destinations in the northeast. The B&A withdrew early on, however, so the trains followed a purely New Haven routing from New York to Worcester. The lack of a direct connection between Boston's North Station and South Station precluded a Boston section.

The completion of the Hell Gate Bridge in 1917 allowed direct rail service from New England through New York to points south, so the New Haven added Washington, D.C., and Philadelphia sections to the Bar Harbor Express which were hauled by the Pennsylvania Railroad.

Destinations north of Portland included Ellsworth, Mount Desert Ferry in Hancock, and Rockland. At Mount Desert Ferry passengers would board ferries for Bar Harbor, reached by 10.8 mile spur from Washington Junction that opened in 1884. The Rockland branch served resort towns such as Boothbay via a stop in Wiscasset.

In 1952 a typical consist of the Bar Harbor Express included sleepers from Washington, Philadelphia and New York to Ellsworth; Philadelphia to Portland; Philadelphia and New York to Rockland; and New York to Plymouth, New Hampshire. The latter was a Friday-only connection with the B&M in Lowell, Massachusetts.

The Bar Harbor Express was hurt by the post-World War II decline in passenger rail traffic which afflicted all passenger services, compounded by a 1947 fire in Bar Harbor. In 1957 the Maine Central truncated the run to Bangor, and ended the train altogether on Labor Day, 1960.

The State of Maine Express traveled a similar route, six days a week, many seasons. It went from New York City's Grand Central Terminal to New Haven, Providence, Worcester, Lowell, Portland and the Bar Harbor region. In contrast to the Bar Harbor Express (which made no stops between Providence and Portland), the State of Maine made several local stops. Passengers to points beyond Portland needed to change to a Maine Central to complete the trip. Various destinations afforded by the Portland transfer included Waterville and Rockland. The default destination was Ellsworth, from which passengers would take ferries to Bar Harbor.

=== 1913 wreck ===
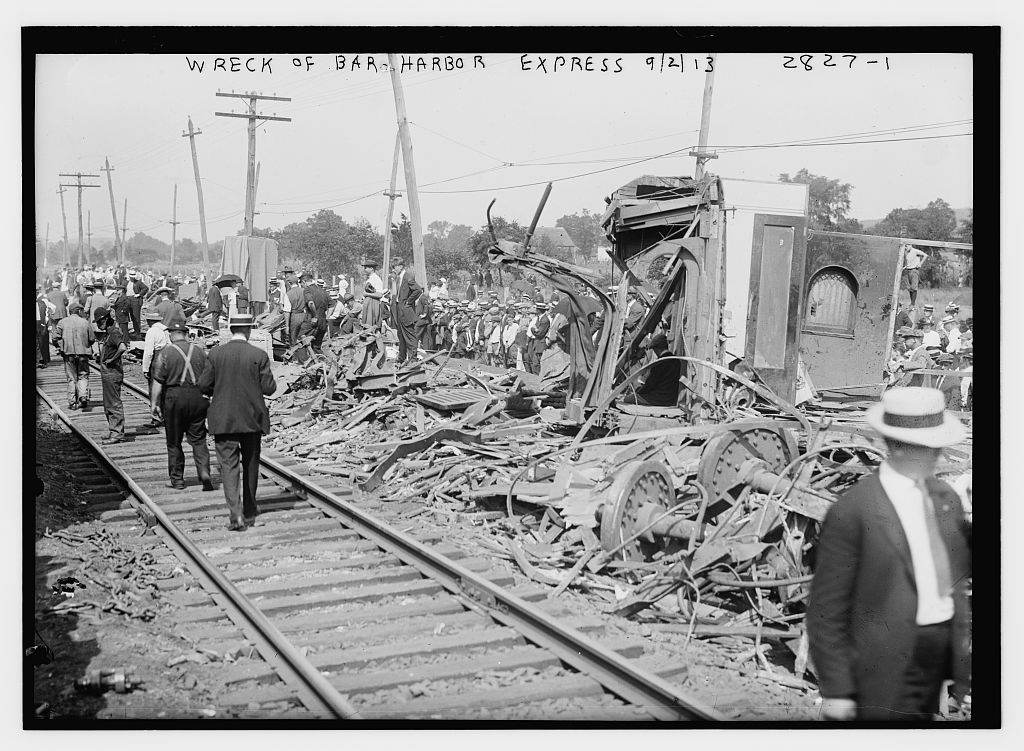

On the morning of September 2, 1913, north of New Haven, Connecticut, travelling at 40 miles per hour (64 km/h) in heavy fog, the White Mountain Express crashed through two cars of the Bar Harbor Express and overturned a third coach, killing 21 and injuring 50.
