= Thaddeus Clark =

Early settler of Falmouth, Maine

- Died: May 1690; Falmouth, Province of Maine
- Occupation: Sea captain

Thaddeus Clark (died 1690) was an early settler of Falmouth, Province of Maine. As a lieutenant in the militia, he defended the city (now named Portland) during King William's War.

Clark Street, in Portland's West End, is now named for him. He lived in the vicinity.

== Death ==
Clark was killed in May 1690 after the group he was in was ambushed by Norridgewock Indians near Fort Loyal, at the foot of India Street.

== See also ==
- Battle of Fort Loyal
