= Edward Tyng (military officer) =

Canadian military officer (c. 1649–1691)

Edward Tyng (ca. 1649 - ca. 1691) was a leading military officer in Maine and was appointed Governor of Acadia during King William's War. He was the commander of Fort Loyal, 1681–82 and 1686–87.

In the Raid on Salmon Falls, the attackers' original intent was to target the home of Edward Tyng, father of Edward Tyng, at Fort Loyal but they changed plans and attacked Salmon Falls instead.

Tyng was also commander at Fort William Henry, and later became Governor of Acadia in 1690, only to be taken prisoner, together with John Alden III, by Simon-Pierre Denys de Bonaventure in the Naval battle off St. John (1691). Alden's father, John Alden Jr., was sent to Boston to arrange an exchange of prisoners, but negotiations stalled and Tyng was sent to Quebec, where he met briefly with another prisoner, Hannah Swarton, and was later transferred to France. He died in prison there, at La Rochelle, some time after 1691.
