= Fort Casco =

Coordinates: 43.7137°N 70.2298°W

- Falmouth, Maine
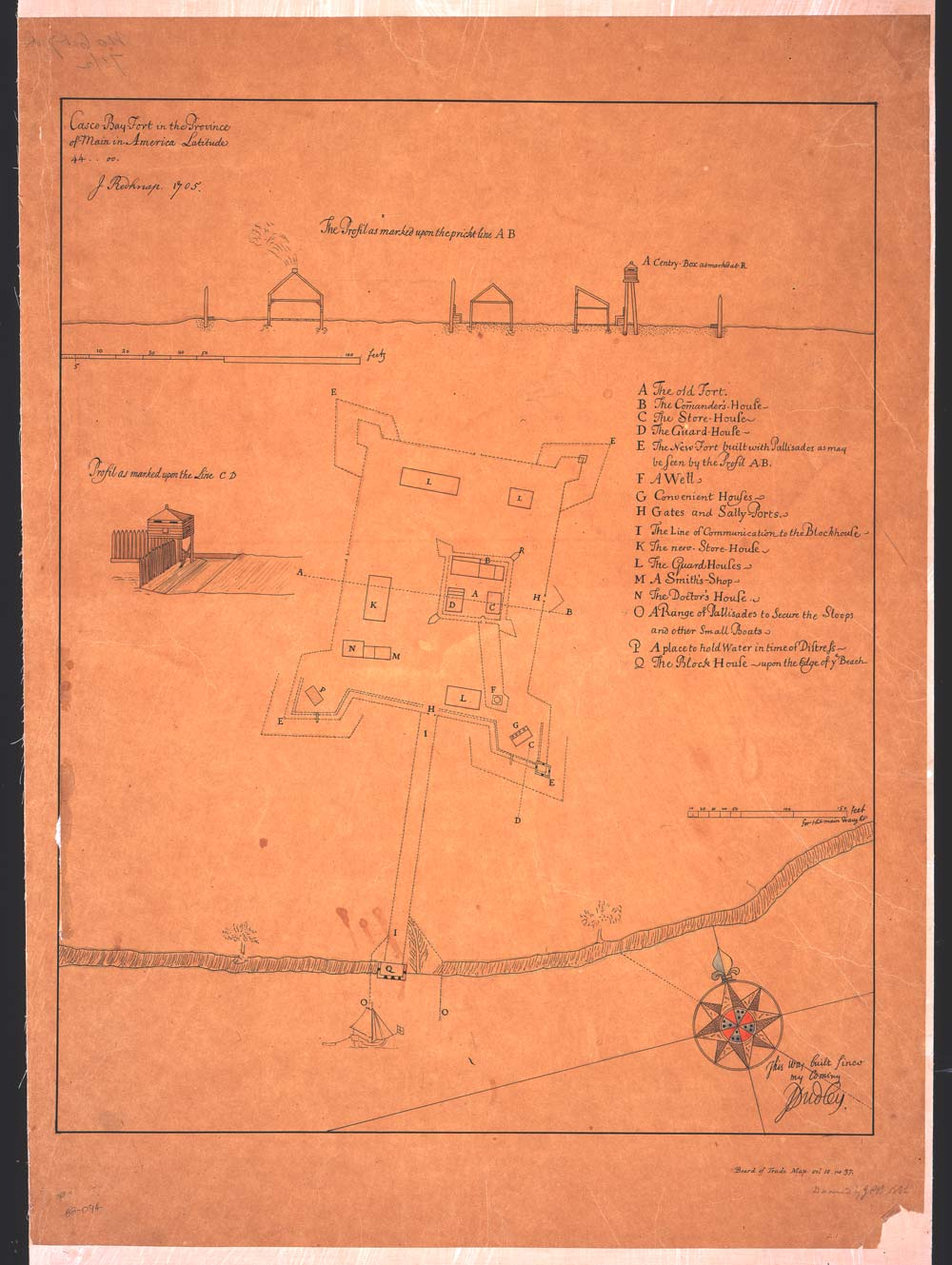
- Rendering of Fort Casco in 1705

Site information
- Type: Fort
- Controlled by: Great Britain

Site history
- Built: 1698 by Wolfgang William Romer
- In use: 1698-1716
- Materials: log palisade
- Battles/wars: Northeast Coast Campaign (1703)

Garrison information
- Past commanders: John March, Samuel Moody

Fort Casco was an English fort built in present-day Falmouth, Maine in 1698. It was the easternmost English fortification in New England and served as the boundary between English settlement and Wabanaki territory.

English colonists fled Casco Bay following the Battle of Fort Loyal in 1690. In order to reestablish a presence in region, Massachusetts built a palisaded fort in New Casco on Casco Bay in 1698 at the conclusion of King William's War. Fort Casco was built at the behest of Wabanakis who desired a convenient place to trade and repair tools, while the British sought to foster better relations with Indians and pull them away from the French sphere of influence by providing them cheaper goods. Following the Fort Casco was the easternmost fort on New England's frontier during these years. A 1701 meeting between Wabanakis and Massachusetts officials cemented an alliance between the two. A pair of stone cairns were then erected to symbolize the new partnership. The nearby Two Brothers Islands later received their name from this monument.

Unfortunately peace would last less than three years, with the inauguration of Queen Anne's War in 1702. Governor Joseph Dudley held a conference at New Casco with representatives of the Abenaki tribes on June 20, 1703 trying to convince them not to ally with the French.

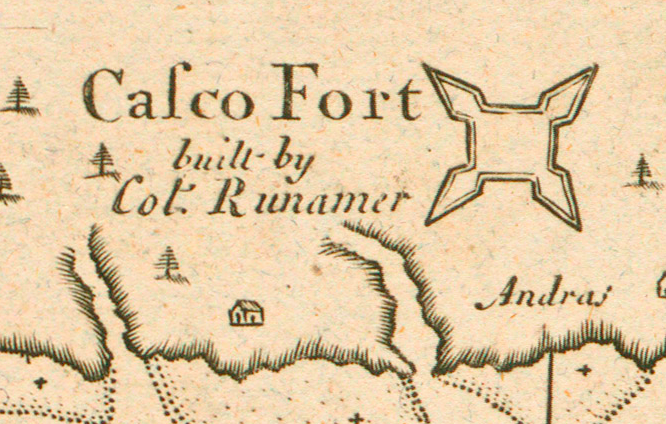
Map ca. 1720 by Cyprian Southack

His efforts were unsuccessful, as the fort was besieged only two months later by Abenaki chiefs Moxus, Wanungonet, Nescambious, and their French Allies in the Northeast Coast Campaign (1703). The natives killed 25 English and took many others prisoner in what is now South Portland and Cape Elizabeth. Vastly outnumbered English were relieved by the armed vessel "Province Galley", which dispersed the Wabanakis and the some 500 French with its guns.

Peace returned in 1713 with the Treaty of Portsmouth. When the resettlement of present-day Portland began in 1716, the Province of Massachusetts ordered that the fort at New Casco be demolished rather than maintain it. Part of the reasoning was the construction of Fort George (Brunswick, Maine) pushed Maine's frontier to the east beyond Falmouth. Fort Casco's site today lies opposite Pine Grove Cemetery on Route 88.
