= Portland Longshoremans Benevolent Society =

Trade union and Irish benevolent society in Portland, Maine, United States

PLSBS
- Portland Longshoremans Benevolent Society
- Merged into: International Longshoremen's Association, 1914
- Founded: 1880
- Location: Portland, Maine, US
- Members: 425-866

The Portland Longshoremans Benevolent Society was a trade union and benevolent society in Portland, Maine, United States. It existed as an independent organization from its founding in 1880 until it affiliated with the International Longshoremen's Association in 1914. Incorporated in 1880, it was composed of primarily Irish and Irish-American dockworkers who loaded and unloaded ships in the Portland waterfront. The early peak of PLSBS membership occurred in 1899 when the union had 868 members. By 1910, declines in the amount of Canadian grain exported through the port meant decreased membership, which hit 425. Having been defeated in two major strikes, the PLSBS affiliated with the International Longshoremen's Association in early 1914. Similar independent unions had recently joined the ILA in Boston and elsewhere.

== Background ==
Ethnic and racial segregation was commonplace in organized labor in North America during the nineteenth and early twentieth centuries. The PLSBS was incorporated during a wave of immigration from Ireland following the Civil War. As a primarily Irish organization, it barred Black men and generally sought to prevent Black stevedores from working on the waterfront. It was successful in this effort, which marked the end of the period when Black workers had been the primary waterfront labor force. Despite the PLSBS attempts to control over the waterfront's labor supply, the union struggled against shipping companies who refused to negotiate with the union. During periods of conflict, such as during the 1911 and 1913 strikes, company owners easily recruited laborers from other ethnic groups, such as Italians or Polish, to replace the Irish strikers.

== 1911 and 1913 strikes ==
Low pay was the union's biggest issue The union notably went on strike twice: 1911 and again in 1913. In both cases, the union was unable to extract concessions from shipping companies. Having been independent since its formation, it initially resisted overtures from larger unions. However, it sought security and joined the International Longshoremen's Association within weeks of its 1913 defeat. World War I soon caused a boom in shipping and the now-ILA affiliated local 861 peaked at 1,366 in 1919.
