= 2014 Noyes Street fire =

Apartment building fire in Portland, Maine

Coordinates: 43.6666°N 70.2800°W

The Noyes Street fire was a fire in an apartment building in Portland, Maine, United States which killed six people. The building's landlord, Gregory Nisbet, was convicted of misdemeanor fire code violations and spent three months in prison. Located near the Portland campus of the University of Southern Maine, the fire occurred overnight on November 1, 2014, and was the deadliest fire in Maine since 1984. It forced the city to address fire safety specifically and unsafe housing more broadly.
