= 1916 Portland, Maine streetcar strike =

Portland streetcar strike
- Date: July 12–15, 1916
- Location: Portland, Maine
- Methods: Striking

The Portland, Maine Streetcar Strike occurred from July 12 to July 17, 1916, in Portland, Maine, United States. It was won by the workers largely due to overwhelming public support.

== Background ==
The first electric streetcars appeared in Portland in 1895 and fully replaced horse-drawn carriages in the spring of 1896. The city's streetcars were owned and operated by the Portland Railroad Company, which was initially locally owned but was purchased by the out-of-state brokerage firm E. W. Clark & Co. in 1912. Working 10-hour shifts seven days a week and regularly exposed to hazardous weather, a section of the Amalgamated Association of Street Railway Employees of America was formed in 1905 but all of the workers associated with it were immediately fired.

== See also ==
- Railroad history of Portland, Maine
- Streetcar strikes in the United States
