= Battle of Falmouth (1690) =

1690 battle of King William's War

Coordinates: 43°39′41.3″N 70°15′19.1″W

- Part of King William's War
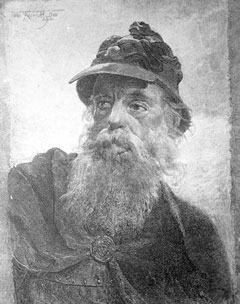
- Baron de St Castin
Date	May 16–20, 1690
Location	Fort Loyal, Falmouth neck (site of present-day Portland, Maine)
Result	French and Wabanaki Confederacy victory

Belligerents
New France; Wabanaki Confederacy	Massachusetts Bay

Commanders and leaders
Joseph-François Hertel de la Fresnière; Baron de St Castin; Chief Hopehood (Kennebecks); Rene Robinau de Portneuf; Augustin Le Gardeur de Courtemanche	Captain Sylvanus Davis

Strength
400–500 troops and natives	Unknown

Casualties and losses
Unknown	200 killed

The Battle of Falmouth (also known as the Battle of Fort Loyal) (May 16–20, 1690) involved Joseph-François Hertel de la Fresnière and Baron de St Castin leading troops as well as the Wabanaki Confederacy (Mi'kmaq and Maliseet from Fort Meductic) in New Brunswick to capture and destroy Fort Loyal and the English settlement on the Falmouth neck (site of present-day Portland, Maine), then part of the Massachusetts Bay Colony. The commander of the fort was Captain Sylvanus Davis. After two days of siege, the settlement's fort, called Fort Loyal (sometimes spelled "Loyall"), surrendered. The community's buildings were burned, including the wooden stockade fort and its people were either killed or taken prisoner. The fall of Fort Loyal (Casco) led to the near depopulation of Europeans in Maine. Native forces were then able to attack the New Hampshire frontier without reprisal.

== Historical context ==
The earliest garrison at Falmouth was Fort Loyal (1678) in what was then the center of town, the foot of India Street. During King William's War, on Major Benjamin Church's first expedition into Acadia, on September 21, 1689, he and 250 troops defended a group of English settlers trying to establish themselves at Falmouth, Maine (present-day Portland, Maine). Natives killed 21 of his men; however, he was successful and the natives retreated. Church then returned to Boston, leaving the small group of English settlers unprotected. Hertel was chosen by Governor Frontenac to lead an expedition in 1690 that successfully raided Salmon Falls on the Maine-New Hampshire border and then moved on to destroy Fort Loyal on Falmouth Neck (site of present-day Portland, Maine).

== Battle ==
In May 1690, four hundred to five hundred French and Indian troops under the command of Joseph-François Hertel de la Fresnière and Baron de St Castin attacked the settlement. Grossly outnumbered, the settlers held out for four days before surrendering. Eventually two hundred were murdered and left in a large heap a few paces from what is now the south end of India Street. One source says that only 10 or 12 survived and were taken into captivity. Davis was taken prisoner to Quebec. A relief expedition under command of Shadrach Walton came too late to save the people from the massacre.

== Aftermath ==
When Church returned to the village later that summer, he buried the dead.

James Alexander was taken captive along with 100 other prisoners. He was taken back to the Maliseet headquarters on the Saint John River at Meductic, New Brunswick. "James Alexander, a Jersey man," was, with John Gyles, tortured at an Indian village on the Saint John River. Two Mi'kmaq families whose friends were killed by New England fishermen travelled many miles to avenge themselves on the captives. They were reported to have yelled and danced around their victims; tossed and threw them; held them by the hair and beat them - sometimes with an axe - and did this all day, compelling them also to dance and sing, until at night they were thrown out exhausted. Alexander, after a second torture, ran to the woods, but hunger drove him back to his tormentors. His fate is unknown.

Captain Davis spent four months as a prisoner in Canada. Both Falmouth and Arrowsic remained uninhabited until 1714 and 1716 respectively.

One captive, Hannah Swarton, returned to New England in 1695 and published an account of her captivity.

The fort was replaced and named Fort Falmouth in 1742 leading up to King George's War.

On 28 May 1690 there was an attack at Fox Point, New Hampshire.

== See also ==
- Military history of the Maliseet people
- Thaddeus Clark, killed in the conflict
