= Victoria Mansion =

Historic house in Portland, Maine

- Morse-Libby House
- U.S. National Register of Historic Places
- U.S. National Historic Landmark
- U.S. Historic district – Contributing property
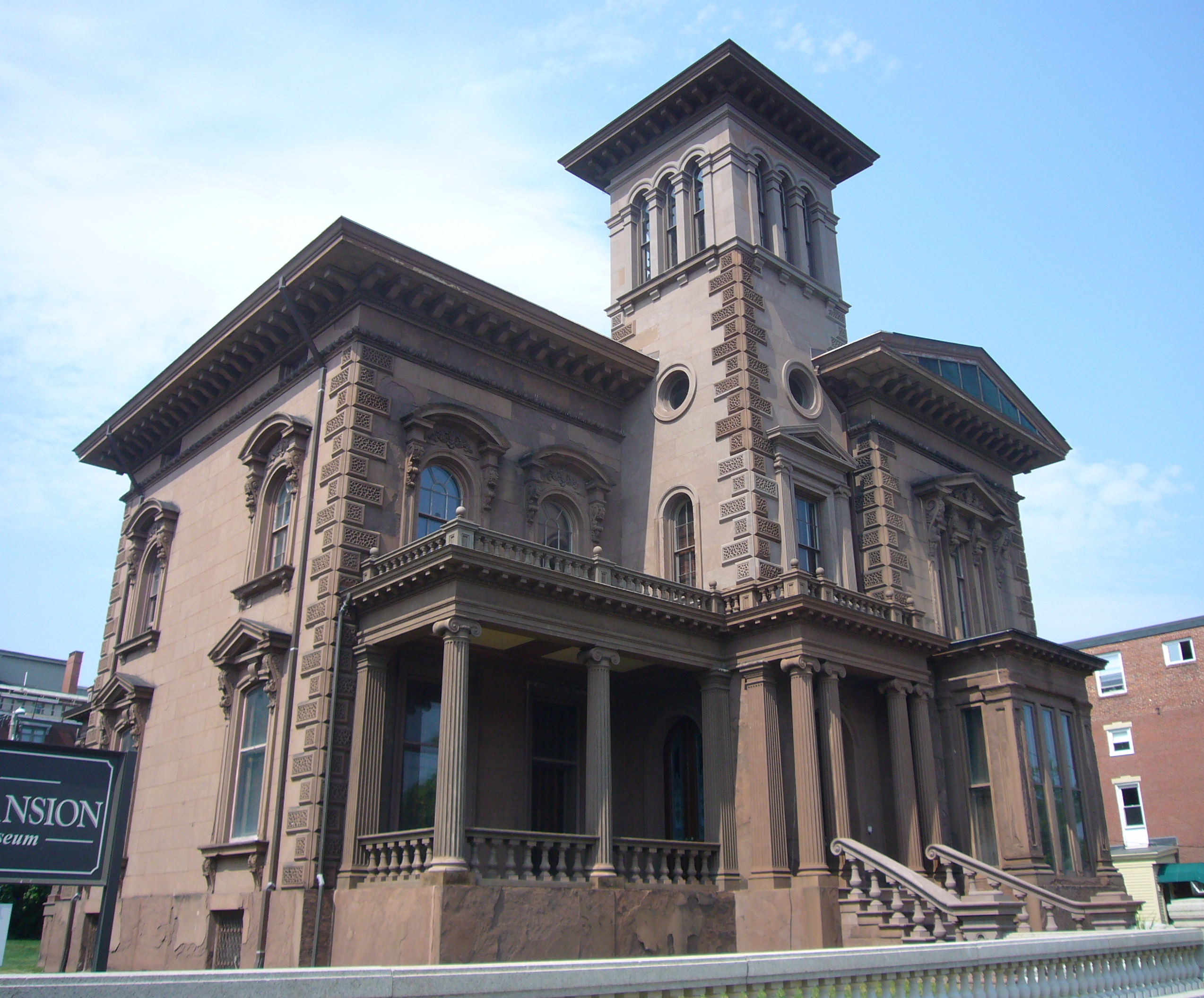
- Victoria Mansion

- Location within Maine Location within the United States
- Location: 109 Danforth Street, Portland, Maine, United States
- Coordinates: 43°39′5.4″N 70°15′38.52″W
- Area: less than one acre
- Built: 1858-1860
- Architect: Henry Austin
- Architectural style: Italianate
- Part of: Spring Street Historic District (ID70000043)
- NRHP reference No.: 70000074

Significant dates
- Added to NRHP: May 19, 1970
- Designated NHL: December 30, 1970
- Designated CP: April 3, 1970

Victoria Mansion, also known as the Morse-Libby House or Morse-Libby Mansion, is a historic house in downtown Portland, Maine, United States. The brownstone exterior, elaborate interior design, opulent furnishings and early technological conveniences provide a detailed portrait of lavish living in nineteenth-century America. It was declared a National Historic Landmark in 1971 for its architectural significance as a particularly well-preserved Italianate mansion.

== House ==
This stately brownstone Italianate villa was completed in 1860 as a summer home for hotelier Ruggles Sylvester Morse. Morse had left Maine to make his fortune in hotels in New York, Boston and New Orleans. The house was designed by the New Haven architect Henry Austin. Its distinctive asymmetric form includes a four-story tower, overhanging eaves, verandas, and ornate windows. The frescoes and trompe-l'œil wall decorations were created by the artist and decorator Giuseppe Guidicini.

The building is recognized as one of the finest, and least-altered examples of a large Italianate brick/brownstone home in the United States. Gustave Herter created the interiors in a range of styles, and this house is his earliest known and only intact commission. Due to donations by the Libby family, 97 percent of the original contents survive, including Herter furniture, elaborate wall paintings, artworks, carpets, gas lighting fixtures, stained glass, porcelain, silver, and glassware.

The house has twin sinks in the guest bedroom on the second floor; a Turkish smoking room, which is one of the first examples of Islamic architecture in the United States; carved marble fireplaces; and a flying staircase. When designing the home, Morse incorporated features from his luxury hotels, including the large and tall entryway, and wall-to-wall carpeting. The house used some of the latest technologies of the era (some of which he also took from his hotels), such as central heating, gas lighting, hot and cold running water, and a servant call system. As part of a new and unique design, the water for the house was provided by gutters in the tower and third floor, which ran down through pipes into all the rooms, with separate pipes for heated water, which was heated using coal, and another for cold water.

Morse lived in the house until his death in 1893. A year later, the house and its contents were sold by his wife to Joseph Ralph Libby, a Portland merchant and department store owner. The Libby family occupied the house for over 30 more years, until 1928, without making significant changes to it. However, one significant change made was the repainting of the green room in white, which restorationists were unable to restore once it became a museum.

== Museum ==
The last of the Libbys moved out of the home in 1928. Due in part to the Great Depression a year later, the home was repossessed in 1939 due to back taxes soon after the 1938 Portland flood. After this, the house became abandoned and its fate was uncertain. There were plans by an oil company to buy the dilapidated home, and then demolish it to build a gas station. However, it was saved by William H. Holmes who bought the house in order to preserve it as a museum. In 1941, Holmes opened the house as the Victoria Mansion (named for Britain's Queen Victoria), later being added to the National Historic Register, and continues to be open as a museum every day from 10am-3:45pm.

== See also ==
- List of National Historic Landmarks in Maine
- National Register of Historic Places listings in Portland, Maine
- List of Gilded Age mansions in Maine
