= Railroad history of Portland, Maine =

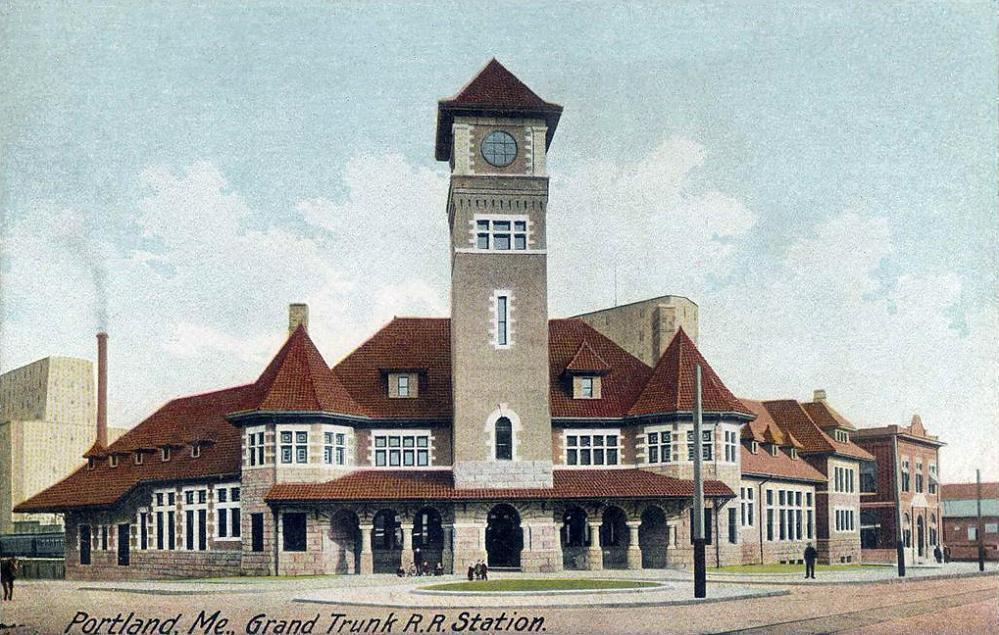
Portland's Grand Trunk Station in 1906

The railroad history of Portland, Maine, began in 1842 with the arrival of the Portland, Saco & Portsmouth Railroad (PS&P). Most of the rail activity in Portland concerned agricultural goods bound for export and European import freight. But Maine's largest city also enjoyed 125 years of continuous passenger rail service from 1842 until 1967, and has been served by Amtrak since 2001. For most of Portland's history, passenger train schedules were designed with intercity travel—to Boston, Montreal, Nova Scotia, and points west—rather than daily commuting.

== Brief history ==
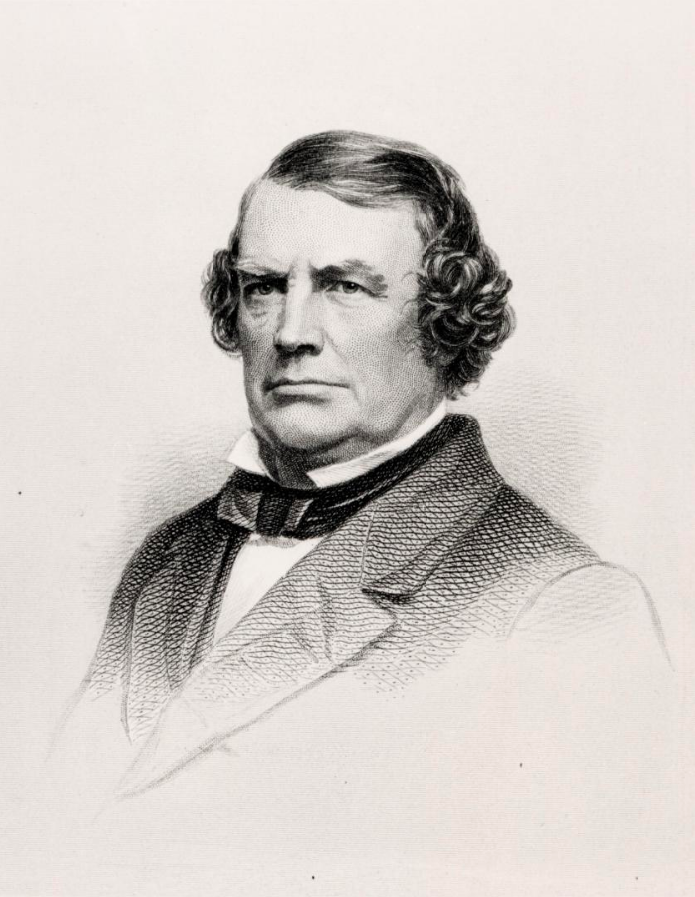
John A. Poor circa 1860

Portland first became a transportation hub when the Cumberland and Oxford Canal to interior Maine was completed in 1832. The first railroad reached the city a decade later: the Portland, Saco & Portsmouth Railway (PS&P), whose joint operation with the Eastern Railroad of Massachusetts began in 1842. The PS&P's main terminal in Portland was on Commercial Street, south of Union Street. Six passenger trains per day connected Portland with East Boston. The Boston & Maine Railroad (B&M) arrived in 1843 (via PS&P to Portland).

Portland businessmen, led by John A. Poor, believed rail connections with Boston threatened Portland's independent seaport. Writer, critic, and Atlantic & St. Lawrence Railroad (A&StL) co-founder John Neal wrote of the necessity "to drive Boston out of the business and secure [a] monopoly." Poor promoted a separate system of 5 ft 6 in (1,676 mm) railroads to funnel interior traffic to Portland in competition with the 4 ft 8 1/2 in (1,435 mm) standard gauge railroads bringing traffic into the port of Boston. The Portland Company was organized in 1846 to build locomotives for the A&StL (with trains from India Street in Portland to Yarmouth in 1848 and ultimately to Montreal in 1859). Services to Auburn, Lewiston, and Waterville began in 1849 on lines of the original Maine Central (MEC) system that are now CSX Corporation to Lewiston, Waterville and Bangor. The route to Brunswick opened in 1847 as a portion of the Kennebec & Portland Railroad, which was subsequently subsumed by the MEC and GRS.

The Portland gauge railways north of Portland were converted to standard gauge in the 1870s. The line from the India Street station to Montreal remained independent as the Grand Trunk Railway, while the remaining lines were consolidated as the Maine Central Railroad and came under the control of the Boston & Maine Railroad in 1884. Passenger service through Union Station emphasized connections to Boston until the New York, New Haven and Hartford Railroad introduced convenient long-distance train travel in 1913 with State of Maine overnight sleeping car service to Grand Central Terminal in New York City.

The July 1916 Portland streetcar strike was won by the union workers.

=== Railroad stations of Portland ===
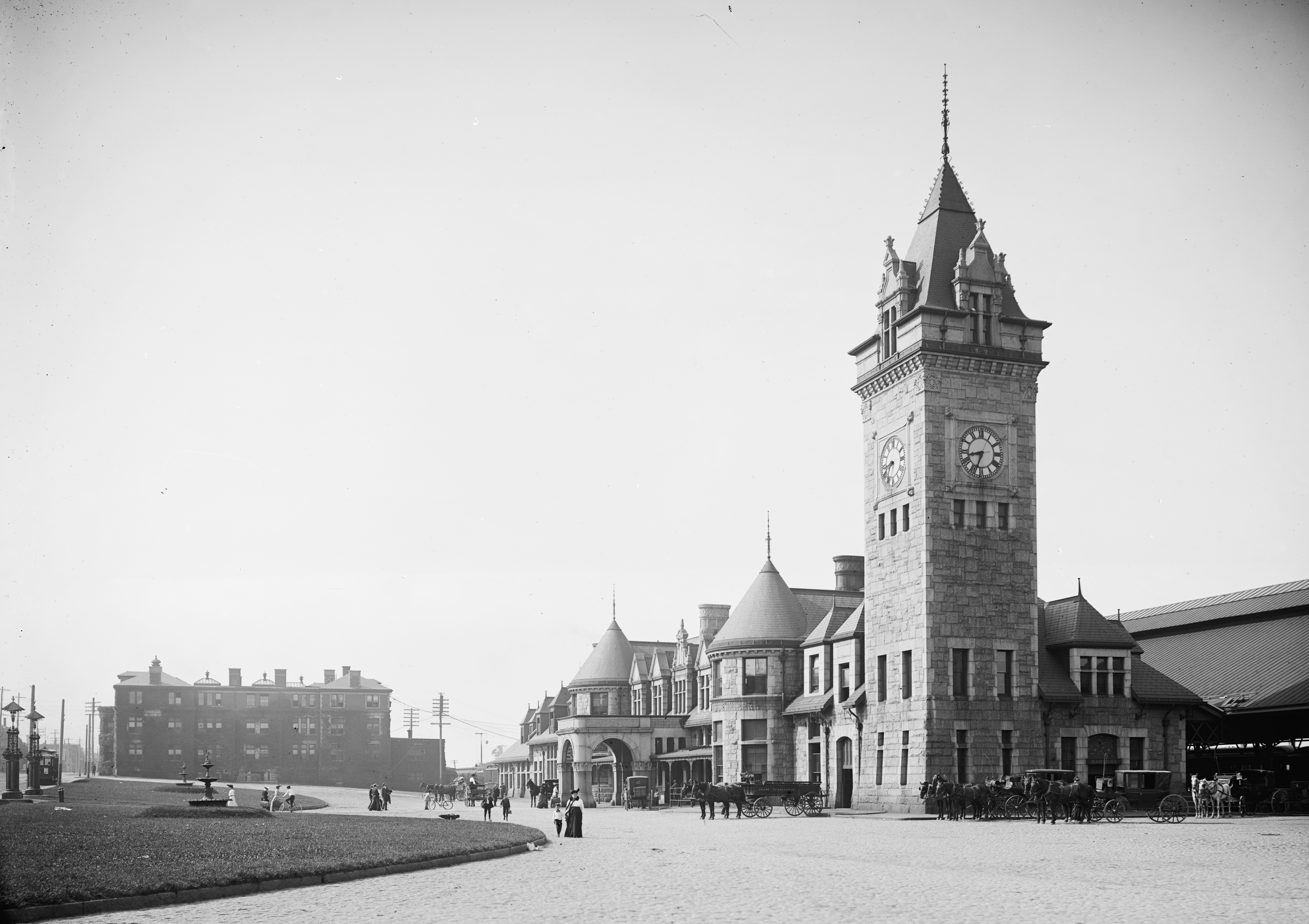
Union Station, 1909

Portland once boasted four passenger rail stations: the Boston & Maine Station ("directly opposite the Eastern & Maine Central Union Station of those days") on Commercial Street and Grand Trunk on the waterfront, Preble Street on the north side, and Union Station to the west. In the early days, trains from the south on the PS&P terminated at Commercial Street south of Union Street, while Grand Trunk trains from the north terminated on the waterfront at India Street.

In 1873, when the B&M completed their line to Portland, their northern terminal (at 43°39′07″N 70°16′48″W) on Saint John Street was named Portland Union Station. With the growth of the B&M, the Commercial Street terminal lost its prominence in the 1870s, and was abandoned in 1894. The Preble Street terminal was constructed to serve the Portland & Rochester (P&R), which eventually became the Worcester, Nashua, and Portland division of the Boston & Maine. It was abandoned in 1900, after which P&R trains were routed to Union Station. By the time the Grand Trunk opened a new terminal on its India Street site in 1903, Portland was down to two passenger stations: the B&M/MEC Portland Union Station on Saint John's Street, reconstructed in 1888, and the Grand Trunk Terminal on the waterfront at India Street.

The current Portland Transportation Center, serving Amtrak's Downeaster service, was constructed specifically for the Downeaster on the former Mountain Division of the Maine Central Railroad.

=== Railroad services in the Golden Era ===
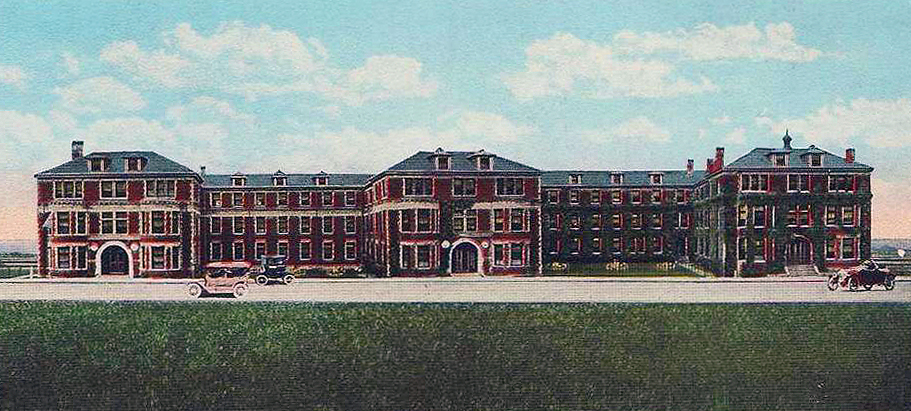
Maine Central Railroad General Office Building at Portland c. 1920

Train service between Portland and Montreal began to decline following nationalization of the Grand Trunk into the Canadian National Railway in 1923. Ascendancy of the Maritimes was acknowledged when the Gull introduced international sleeping car service between Boston and Halifax through Portland in 1930. During the heyday of passenger rail in the 1920s, a variety of companies provided passenger rail services to Portland.

- Portland had two terminals: Union Station and Grand Trunk. All passenger trains, except the two daily Grand Trunk trains to Montreal, operated in and out of Union Station, where switching services were provided by Portland Terminal Company.
- In the westbound direction, Portland had four "banks" of transfers: one in the early morning, one centered on noon, one at 5 pm, and one late at night. Union Station was relatively quiet in between those times.
- Schedules were generally designed to have trains leave Portland in the morning and arrive in the evening. The only notable exceptions were overnight services (MEC #8), the B&M evening connecting services to Boston (B&M #176, 250), and one single commuter-like train in the westbound direction (MEC #138/#44).
- In some cases, traveling to Lewiston required a change of train at Brunswick.
- The afternoon commuter-like trains in the eastbound direction resulted from heavy eastbound connecting traffic from the Boston & Maine. The fact that these trains fell within the commuter timeslot appears accidental.
- There is evidence in the schedule that the Grand Trunk deliberately discouraged commuter travel. GT #83 does not allow terminations in Lewiston, even though it is likely that the equipment moving from Lewiston to Lewiston Junction to meet #83 would have needed to run back empty to Lewiston after its tour of duty.
- Passenger service to Lewiston was unlikely to be competitive with the hourly service offered by the Portland-Lewiston Interurban.

=== How the lines worked ===
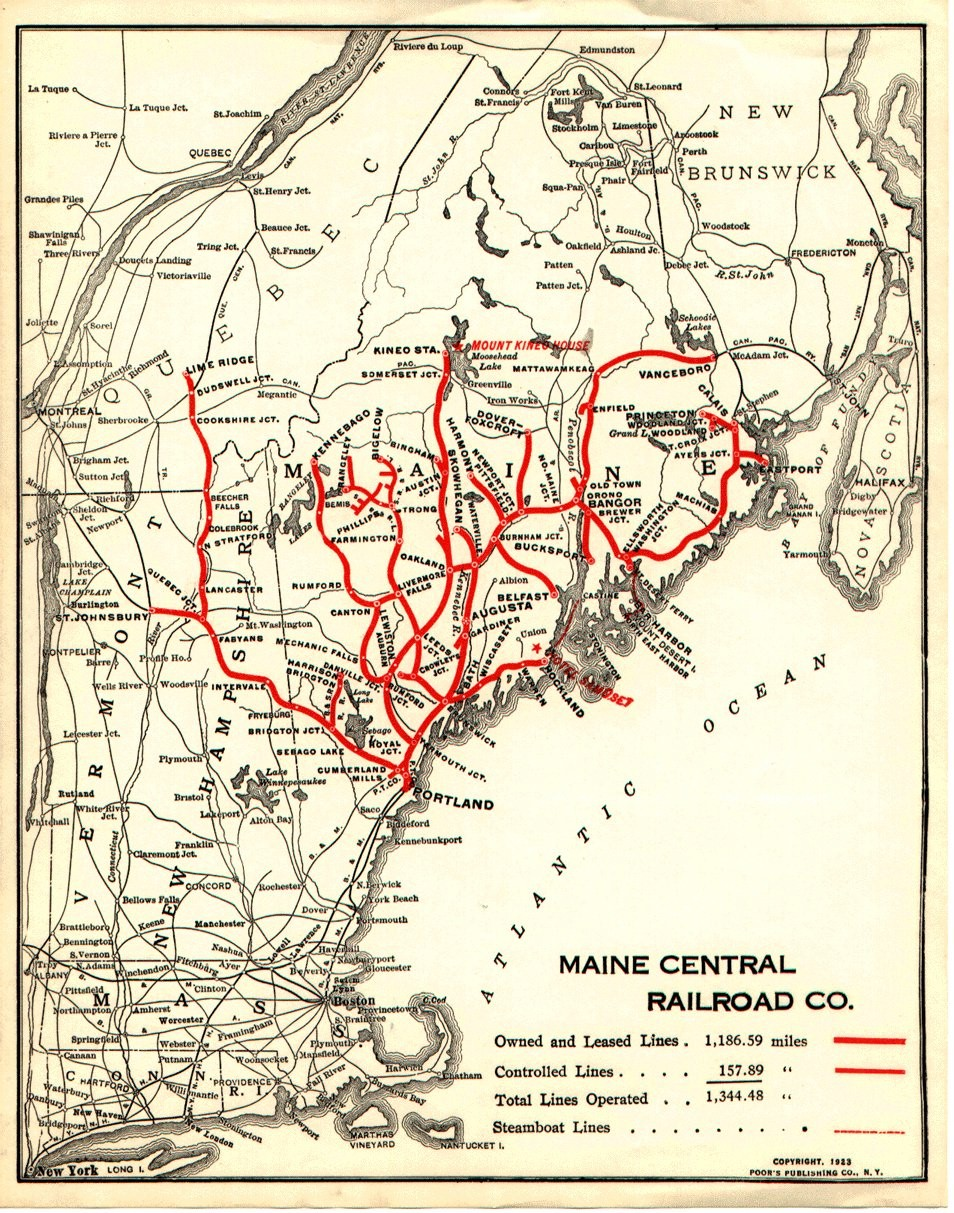
1923 Map of the Maine Central Railroad, showing Portland at the bottom

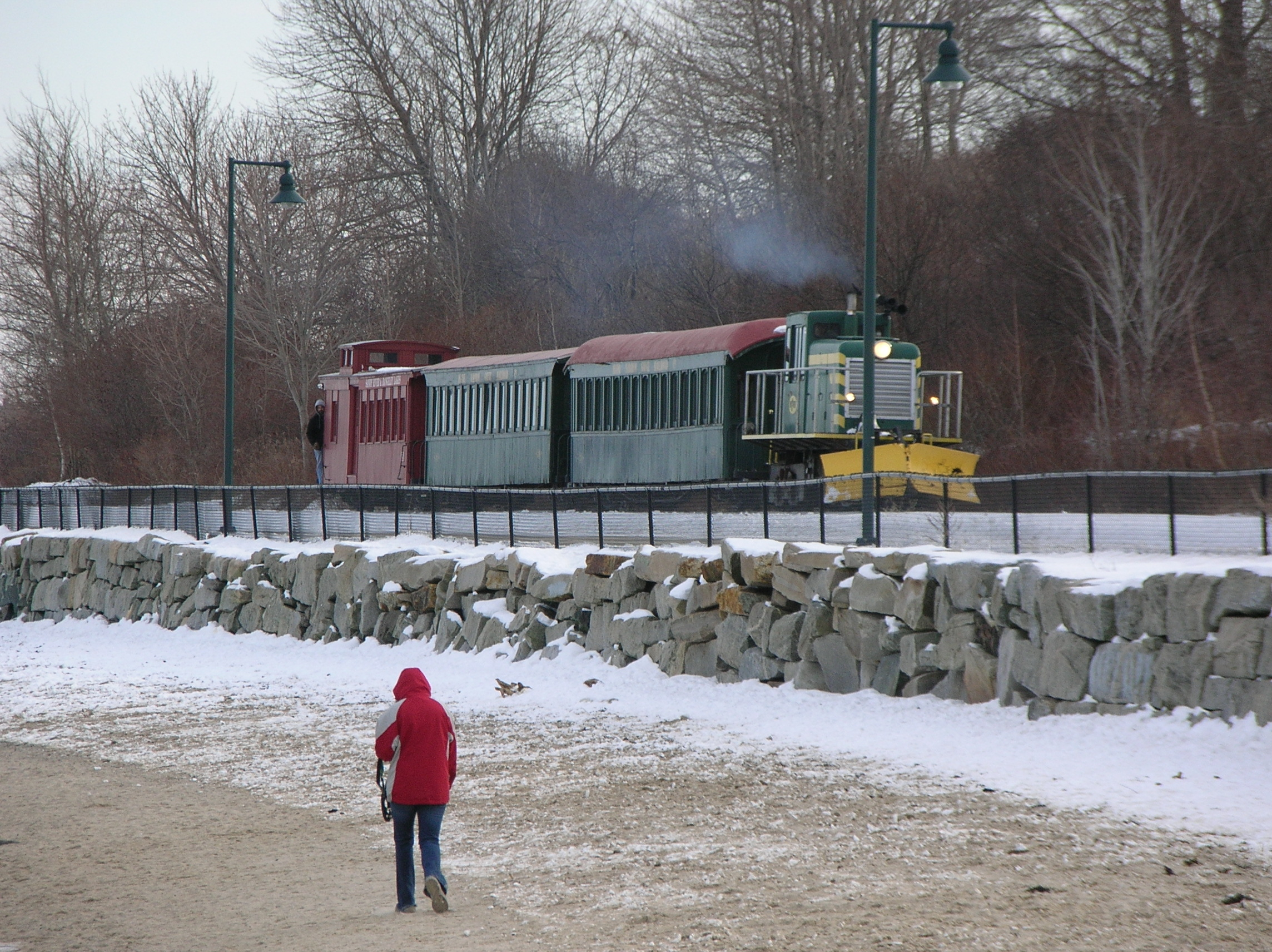
The Maine Narrow Gauge Railroad skirts the Portland waterfront.

The service between Portland and Lewiston Junction (now the site of the Auburn/Lewiston Municipal Airport) ran along the Atlantic & St. Lawrence mainline, which was constructed to Yarmouth in July 1848, then extended to Danville Junction (now Auburn) in November 1848, and reached Lewiston Junction in 1849. During the initial construction activity, a wooden viaduct with a steel swing span was constructed to bridge Back Cove in Portland and India Street on the Portland peninsula. The bridge operated until 1984, when it was damaged by fire.

The Grand Trunk alignment from Yarmouth Junction to Lewiston Junction was initially constructed as a single-track mainline with passing sidings and was never double tracked. As the links were constructed all the way to Montreal, the Grand Trunk obtained a lease on the A&StL and operated that line until 1923, when bankruptcy forced a takeover by the Canadian National Railway. In 1984, following the bridge fire, the line was truncated at East Deering. Freight customers south of Back Cove were served through the Commercial Street connection with Guilford Rail System on the south side. In 1989, the line was purchased by a private owner and renamed the St. Lawrence & Atlantic (SLR). Today, it is part of the Genesee & Wyoming group of short line railroads.

Yarmouth Junction is where the SLR route crosses at a diamond the old Kennebec & Portland (K&P) mainline to Brunswick, known today as Guilford Rail System's Brunswick Branch. The section of K&P in question was constructed in 1847 and was the earliest section of the K&P, reaching Bath in 1849. During the consolidation period in the 1870s, the K&P was acquired by the Maine Central. Because of the higher population along the coast, the K&P route (known as the MEC "Lower Road") once carried many express passenger trains.

Today, the remaining section of the Grand Trunk alignment south of the burned Back Cove Bridge is used by the Maine Narrow Gauge Railway and also survives as the Eastern Promenade Trail pedestrian footpath in Eastern Promenade Park. In 1981, the Maine Central was acquired by Guilford Rail System, which continues to operate limited freight services eastward to Brunswick.

=== Direct service to New York City ===
From early in the 20th century, the B&M, in cooperation with the New Haven Railroad, ran the Bar Harbor Express and the State of Maine, which provided direct service to New York City, bypassing Boston. The summer-only Bar Harbor Express continued to Washington, D.C. The trains diverged from the main route to Boston at Lawrence, south of Haverhill, to proceed southwest. Both trains had their final runs in 1960.

=== The Flying Yankee ===
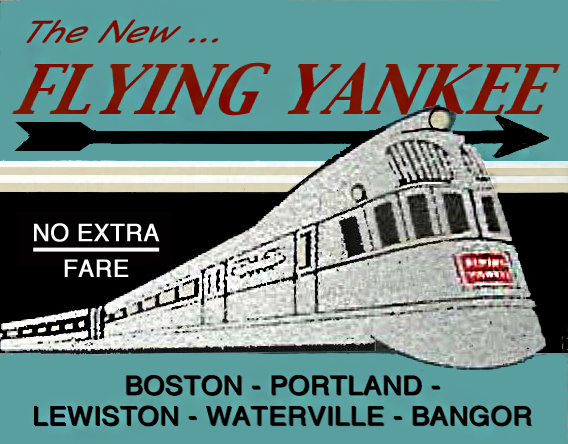

One of the most popular and busiest trains to be operated out of Portland was the Boston-Portland-Bangor Flying Yankee route, which was run jointly by the MEC and Boston & Maine Railroads, making three daily departures (two southbound and one northbound) from Portland Union Station. On April 1, 1935, this service was inaugurated with a then-groundbreaking diesel-powered stainless steel articulated streamline train set. Based at Portland, its three-unit, 142-seat integrated consist was the first such non-steam streamliner to enter service in North America east of the Mississippi, and the third overall in the United States after the Chicago, Burlington and Quincy Railroad's almost identical Pioneer Zephyr (1934–1960) the Union Pacific Railroad's M-10000 (1934–1942).

The Flying Yankee covered about 730 total miles a day on its Monday-through-Saturday runs over a Portland–Boston–Portland–Bangor–Portland–Boston–Portland loop during which it reached speeds of up to 100 miles per hour (160 km/h). After a little over 23 years in operation, during which time the three-unit train set traveled over five million miles, the streamlined Flying Yankee made its final revenue runs on May 7, 1957, and was then retired from service. The Penobscot continued serving the Bangor-Boston route to 1959.

=== Demise of the Portland passenger rail service ===
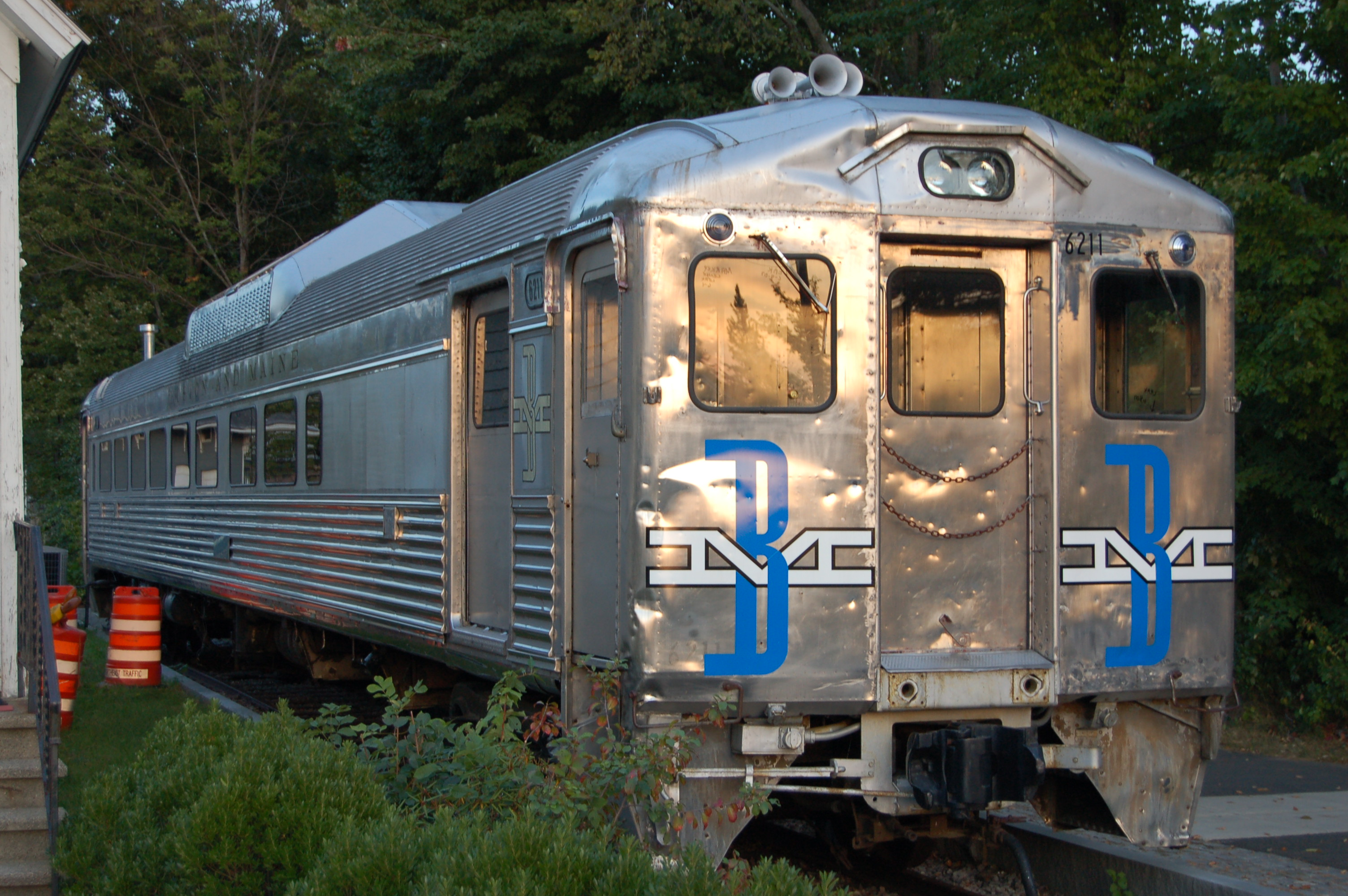
Boston & Maine Railroad car installed at the Bedford Depot Park in Bedford, Massachusetts

Passenger service on the P&R was completely abandoned in 1932. By 1954, the Maine Central was operating scheduled bus services between Lewiston and Portland in place of some trains, but for the trains that did run, the trip time was reduced from about 90 minutes in the 1920s to as low as 55 minutes. In 1954, Grand Trunk continued to operate one train daily to Portland and Lewiston from Montreal.

As passenger service declined, passenger facilities were deactivated. India Street lost its prominent tower in 1948, and the station itself was demolished in 1966. Union Station in Portland was razed in 1961, but its demolition spurred the beginning of Portland's historic preservation movement.

In the twilight years of railroad-operated rail passenger service, the Gull, State of Maine, and all passenger service on the Maine Central (Portland–Bangor) ceased in 1960. The Lewiston service via the Maine Central was discontinued in the mid-1950s. The Boston & Maine ended its service between Boston and Portland in 1965 and, in 1967, the Grand Trunk Railway discontinued its once-weekly, summer-only Sunday service to and from Montreal, ending the last scheduled passenger service to Portland and Lewiston.

== Revivals since 1980 ==
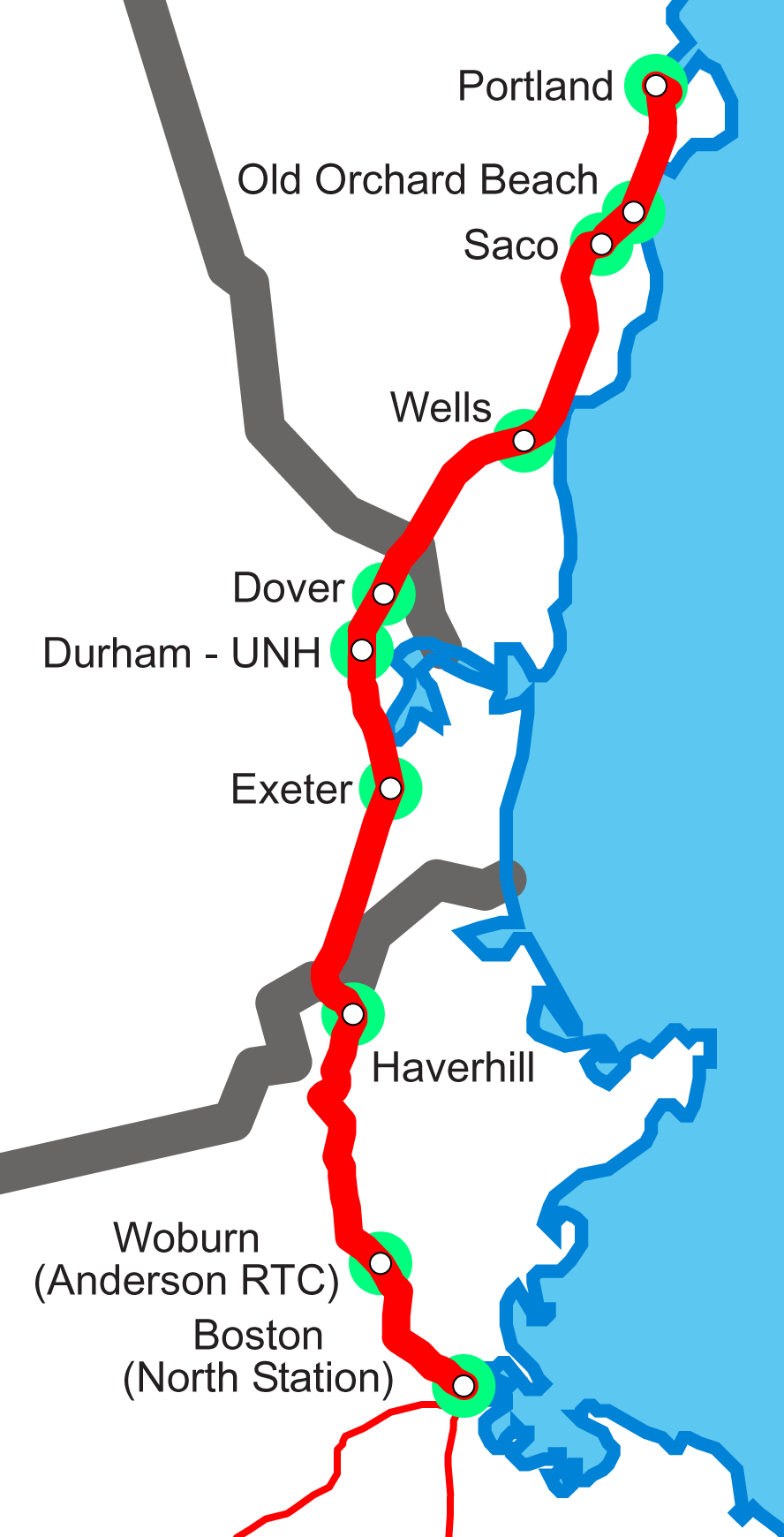
Amtrak Downeaster map

=== Portland Downeaster ===
The Trainriders Northeast advocacy group was formed in Portland in 1989 with the initial goal of restarting passenger service from Massachusetts into Maine. Starting in 1990, the State of Maine began active planning for the restoration of passenger rail service between Portland and Boston. The Northern New England Passenger Rail Authority was formed in 1995 to manage the service.

The Amtrak Downeaster service began operating with four daily round trips to North Station in December 2001. In October 2007, following construction of additional passing tracks, the schedule was increased to five round trips on most days.

In Portland, the Downeaster terminates at an intermodal station with a large parking lot west of the Portland peninsula on GRS's Mountain Division.

=== Brunswick ===
In June 1987, the State of Maine purchased the 56-mile (90 km) Rockland Branch between Brunswick and Rockland and the Calais Branch from the Maine Central Railroad. Guilford serves few customers in Brunswick. East of Brunswick, the state refurbished the Rockland Branch to FRA Class 3 standards. The Maine Eastern Railroad was recently named to operate the railway with seasonal passenger excursions and limited freight traffic interchanging with Guilford in Brunswick.

As of January 2009, a plan was being discussed that would extend the Downeaster service to Brunswick via the Guilford (now Pan Am Railways) alignment by making a reverse move at the Portland Intermodal Transportation Center. The Downeaster arriving from Boston would platform at the station same way as it does now, change ends, and then travel over a yet-to-be constructed wye which would connect the former MEC Mountain Division to the Guilford main line, and thence to Brunswick.

On January 28, 2010, the Northern New England Passenger Rail Authority (NNEPRA) received approval for a $35 million grant from the federal government to fund track and signal upgrades for the Portland-Brunswick line. Pan Am Railways began work on the line in summer 2010. Service to Brunswick returned on November 1, 2012.

=== Ski train ===
In 1993, a seasonal winter service between East Deering and Bethel was begun to carry skiers to and from Bethel on the Grand Trunk alignment. However, due to unfavorable economics and that planned connecting passenger rail service to Boston had not materialized to support the ski train, the service was discontinued in 1997 after three years of operation.

== Street cars ==
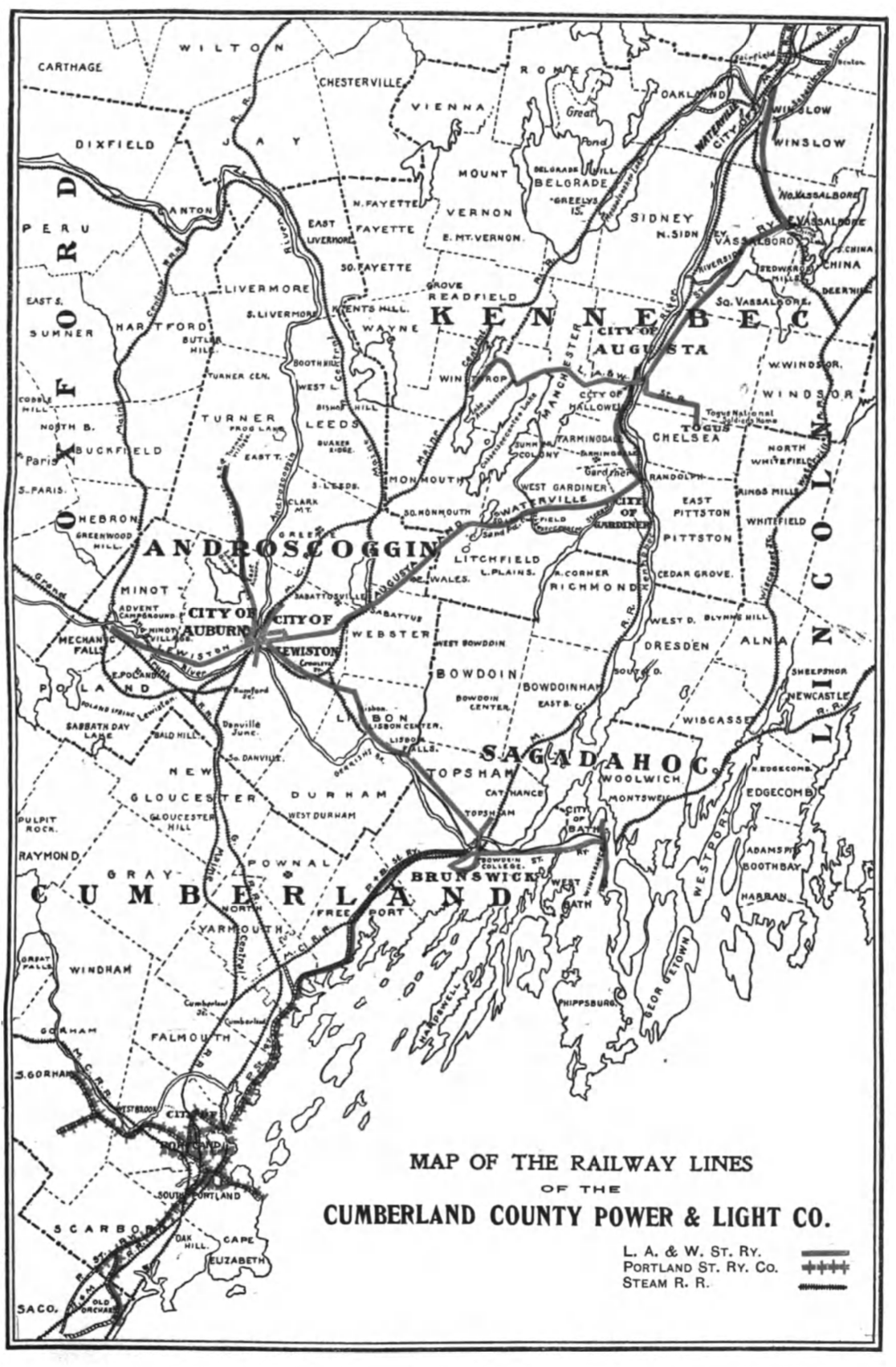
Map of the Railway Lines of the Cumberland County Power and Light Company c 1912

The Portland & Forest Avenue Railroad Company was chartered in 1860 to build a street car line from the India Street station of the Grand Trunk Railway.

== See also ==
- Portland Transportation Center
