= Murder of Zoe Sarnacki =

2009 murder in Maine, United States

- Born: March 25, 1991; Portland, Maine, U.S.
- Died: May 25, 2009 (aged 18); Cumberland Avenue, Old Port, Maine
- Cause of death: Strangulation
- Known for: Murder victim
- Partner: Chad Gurney

Zoe Sarnacki, an 18-year-old resident of Portland, Maine, United States, was murdered by Chad Thomas Gurney, her 29-year-old boyfriend on May 25, 2009. During his trial, a judge rejected an insanity defense. In March 2011, Gurney was found guilty and sentenced to 50 years in prison for the murder and 10 years for arson.

== Background ==
=== Zoe Sarnacki ===
Sarnacki was a former Deering High School student who worked at Bagel Works in Portland's Old Port district. She was interested in world religions, cultures and travel, and was described as having a vibrant, positive personality. She lived in South Portland at the time of her death.

=== Chad Gurney ===
Chad Gurney

Gurney was a former Liberty University lacrosse player who suffered severe injuries in a van crash in Alabama in March 2005. The accident occurred when the lacrosse team's 15-passenger van was rear-ended by another school van and pushed into the path of a tractor-trailer. Gurney suffered a head injury and other injuries requiring 20 surgeries, and received a multimillion-dollar insurance settlement.

== The murder ==
Gurney and Sarnacki met at a tattoo shop in the Old Port in late March 2009. In May 2009, Gurney traveled to Vancouver, and upon his return, Sarnacki told him she had been intimate with another man while he was away. Gurney asked Sarnacki to quit her job and travel with him to Thailand, but she refused.

On May 25, 2009, firefighters were called to a blaze at Gurney's Cumberland Avenue apartment, where they found Sarnacki's charred body. Her head had been severed, and several items including a crucifix had been placed on or around the body. Gurney told detectives he had strangled Sarnacki and cut off her head with a knife, then bought gasoline at a nearby station, poured it on the body and ignited it before driving to a motel in Old Orchard Beach, where he was arrested.

== Trial and appeal ==
Gurney waived his right to a jury trial and appeared before Cumberland County Superior Court Justice Roland Cole. His defense argued he was not criminally responsible by reason of insanity, claiming his 2005 head injury and withdrawal from prescription medications caused a psychotic break.

Prosecutors argued that Gurney was angry about Sarnacki's infidelity and her refusal to travel with him, and that he was planning an insanity defense within hours of the murder. On February 4, 2011, Justice Cole found Gurney guilty of murder and arson, ruling that while Gurney had personality disorders, he understood his actions were wrong.

Gurney appealed his conviction to the Maine Supreme Judicial Court, arguing that evidence found on his computer should not have been admissible. On February 7, 2012, the Maine Supreme Judicial Court unanimously upheld Gurney's conviction.

== Aftermath ==
Sarnacki's family settled a wrongful death lawsuit against Gurney for $1.35 million, paid from his insurance settlement.

An Act To Give Judges Greater Flexibility When Sentencing Defendants Convicted of Murder was introduced in direct response to the trial following Sarnacki's murder. The legislation added "extreme mistreatment of the body of the victim after the death of the victim" as an aggravating circumstance that would justify a life sentence. The bill's summary explicitly stated it was "in response to the sentencing in Cumberland County Superior Court of Chad Gurney for the murder of Zoe Sarnacki."

A vigil for Sarnacki attracted more than 150 people and was described as the largest domestic violence victim vigil ever held in Portland at that time.
