= Joseph-François Hertel de la Fresnière =

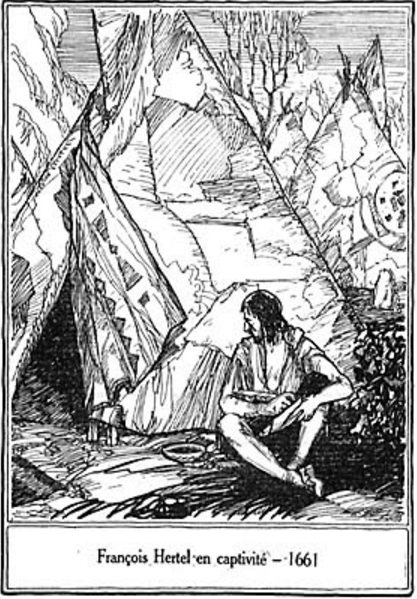
François Hertel in captivity, 1661

Joseph-François Hertel de la Fresnière (French pronunciation: [ʒozɛf fʁɑ̃swa ɛʁtɛl də la fʁɛnjɛʁ]; baptised 3 July 1642 - buried 22 May 1722) was a military officer of New France. Born in Trois-Rivières to Jacques Hertel de La Fresnière and Marie Marguerie, he grew up in an atmosphere of continual warfare with the Haudenosaunee, he grew up with the constant threat of military action against the Haudenosaunee. Captured by the Haudenosaunee in 1661, he was held captive and subjected to torture before being adopted by an elderly Haudenosaunee woman, who taught him the Iroquois language. He escaped and returned to Trois-Rivières around 1663, when his family believed him to be dead.

He participated in numerous expeditions against the Haudenosaunee, and assisted in the construction of Fort Frontenac. He was briefly imprisoned by French authorities on allegations of illegal fur trade in 1678.

At the beginning of 1690, Frontenac appointed Hertel to lead an expedition against Salmon Falls, specifically the nearby fort at Rollinsford, and then participated in the capture and destruction of Fort Loyal and the English settlement on Falmouth Neck (site of present-day Portland, Maine). Upon his return to Canada, he participated in the defense of Quebec when it was attacked by New England colonists under Sir William Phips.

== Personal life ==
He married Marguerite de Thavenet on September 22, 1664, and had 15 children. Some of his sons, most famously Jean-Baptiste Hertel de Rouville, followed him into military service, and the name Hertel became notorious in the English colonies because of their exploits. In 1716, after many years of requests by New France's governors on his behalf, he was elevated to local nobility.

One of Hertel's sisters was Marguerite (b. 26 August 1649), who married Jean Crevier de Saint-François, in 1663.
