= Fort Loyal =

Coordinates: 43.6590°N 70.2481°W

- Portland, Maine
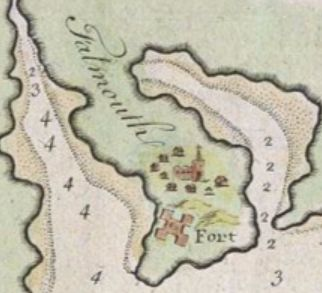
- Fort Falmouth on Falmouth Neck; map by Henry Barnsley, 1763

Site information
- Type: Fort
- Controlled by: Great Britain

Site history
- Built: 1678
- In use: 1678-1690, 1742-1763, 1775-1783
- Materials: log palisade
- Battles/wars: Battle of Fort Loyal

Garrison information
- Past commanders: Edward Tyng, George Lockhart, Sylvanus Davis, Moses Fowler, Abner Lowell
- Garrison: 15

Fort Loyal was a British settler refuge and colonial outpost built in 1678 at Falmouth (present-day Portland, Maine) in Casco Bay. It was destroyed in 1690 by Abenaki and French forces at the Battle of Fort Loyal. The fort was rebuilt in 1742 and renamed Falmouth Fort before King George's War and rearmed again in 1755 for the French and Indian War. The fort was rebuilt a final time in 1775 for the American Revolution.

The peninsula was first colonized by the English in 1632 as a fishing and trading village named Casco. When the Massachusetts Bay Colony absorbed the Province of Maine in 1658, the town's name changed to Falmouth. In 1676, the village was destroyed by the Abenaki during King Philip's War. English colonists returned two years later when peace resumed.

Fort Loyal was built in 1678 in the center of Portland at the foot of present-day India Street to protect the town from future attacks. In 1690 Fort Loyal consisted of four wooden blockhouses and eight guns. During King William's War, a raiding party of French and Native allies destroyed the English settlement and massacred its inhabitants in the Battle of Fort Loyal (1690). At the end of the conflict Massachusetts did not rebuild the fort, instead building Fort Casco in Falmouth.

The fort was rebuilt in 1742 and renamed "Falmouth Fort" before King George's War and then rearmed during the French and Indian War in 1755.

Reverend Thomas Smith described the 1759 celebration at the fort in Falmouth upon the arrival of news that Quebec had fallen: "The cannon were fired at the fort yesterday and today. Mr. Mayhew's house was illuminated, and small arms fired in the evening, upon further and more authentic news of the victory at Quebec."

Earthworks were constructed on the Fort Loyal site in 1775 as part of harbor defenses during the American Revolution and known as the "Lower Battery." Elements from earlier iterations of the fort, such as the guard house, were still in use. The bluff on which the fort had been located, beside Clay Cove, was leveled off during the construction of the Grand Trunk Railway in the 1850s. Today, the fort's location is memorialized by a plaque on the Grand Trunk Office Building at the corner of India and Thames Streets in Portland.
