= List of ship launches in 1694 =

The list of ship launches in 1694 includes a chronological list of some ships launched in 1694.

Date	Ship	Class	Builder	Location	Country	Notes
6 January	Shoreham	fifth rate frigate		Shoreham-by-Sea	England	For Royal Navy.
6 February	Scarborough	Fifth rate frigate	builder	location	England	For Royal Navy.
17 March	Sunderland	Fourth rate	Winter	Southampton	England	For Royal Navy.
3 April	Lancaster	Third rate	William Wyatt	Bursledon	England	For Royal Navy.
3 April	Postboy	Advice boat		Plymouth Dockyard	England	For Royal Navy.
3 April	Messenger	Advice boat	Elias Waffe	Plymouth Dockyard	England	For Royal Navy.
17 April	Anglesea	Fourth rate	Elias Waffe	Plymouth	England	For Royal Navy.
19 April	Ipswich	Third rate	Barret	Harwich	England	For Royal Navy.
April	Réale	Galley		Marseille	Kingdom of France	For French Navy.
April	Paramour	Pink	Fisher Harding	Deptford	England	For Royal Navy.
16 June	Province Galley	Ketch		Salem	(Kingdom of England) Province of Massachusetts Bay	For Massachusetts Navy.
26 September	Drake	Sixth rate	George Fowler	Rotherhithe	England	For Royal Navy.
September	William & Mary	Ketch-rigged Royal yacht	Robert Lee	Chatham Dockyard	England	For William III / Royal Navy.
9 October	Chatham Hulk	Sheer hulk	Robert Lee	Chatham Dockyard	England	For Royal Navy.
23 October	Colchester	Fourth rate	Henry Johnson	Blackwall Yard	England	For Royal Navy.
23 October	Romney	Fourth rate	Johnson	Blackwall Yard	England	For Royal Navy.
22 November	Pembroke	Fourth rate	Snelgrove	Deptford	England	For Royal Navy.
8 December	Dorsetshire	Third rate	Winter	Southampton	England	For Royal Navy.
Unknown date	America	East Indiaman			England	For British East India Company.
Unknown date	Brak	Fifth rate frigate	Hendrik Cardinaal	Amsterdam	Dutch Republic	For Dutch Navy.
Unknown date	Cruijtberg	Fifth rate frigate			Dutch Republic	For Dutch Navy.
Unknown date	Deventer	Third rate	Hendrik Cardinaal	Amsterdam	Dutch Republic	For Dutch Navy.
Unknown date	Dieren	Third rate			Dutch Republic	For Dutch Navy.
Unknown date	Dolfijn	Hooker		Rotterdam	Dutch Republic	For Dutch Navy.
Unknown date	Dom van Utrecht	Third rate	Hendrik Cardinaal	Amsterdam	Dutch Republic	For Dutch Navy.
Unknown date	Falcon	Sixth rate	Nicholas Barrett	Shoreham-by-Sea	England	For Royal Navy.
Unknown date	Fier	First rate	Honore Mallet and Pierre Masson	Rochefort	Kingdom of France	For French Navy.
Unknown date	Fly	Advice boat	William Stigent	Portsmouth Dockyard	England	For Royal Navy.
Unknown date	Friesland	Third rate		Harlingen	Dutch Republic	For Dutch Navy.
Unknown date	Firebrand	Fireship		Limehouse	England	For Royal Navy.
Unknown date	Hastings	Fifth rate frigate	Thomas Ellis	Shoreham-by-Sea	England	For Royal Navy.
Unknown date	Hellevoetsluis	Fifth rate	Van Leeuwen	Rotterdam	Dutch Republic	For Dutch Navy.
Unknown date	Katiwjk op Zee	Third rate	Hendrik Cardinaal	Amsterdam	Dutch Republic	For Dutch Navy.
Unknown date	Kortgene	Fourth rate			Dutch Republic	For Dutch Navy.
Unknown date	Kruidberg	Sixth rate			Dutch Republic	For Dutch Navy.
Unknown date	Lands Magazijn	Sixth rate fluyt	Van Leeuwen	Rotterdam	Dutch Republic	For Dutch Navy.
Unknown date	Patronne	Galley	Jean-Baptiste Chabert	Marseille	Kingdom of France	For French Navy.
Unknown date	Perle	Galley	Simon Chabert	Marseille	Kingdom of France	For French Navy.
Unknown date	Maan	Fourth rate			Dutch Republic	For Dutch Navy.
Unknown date	Martin	Ketch	James Parker	Southampton	England	For Royal Navy.
Unknown date	Matenesse	Sixth rate frigate	Van Leeuwen	Rotterdam	Dutch Republic	For Dutch Navy.
Unknown date	Milford	Fifth rate frigate	William Hubbard	Ipswich	England	For Royal Navy.
Unknown date	Nijmegen	Third rate	Hendrik Cardinaal	Amsterdam	Dutch Republic	For Dutch Republic Navy.
Unknown date	Overijssel	Third rate	Van Leeuwen	Rotterdam	Dutch Republic	For Dutch Navy.
Unknown date	Phoenix	Sixth rate			England	For Royal Navy.
Unknown date	Prinses Amelia	Fourth rate			Dutch Republic	For Dutch Navy.
Unknown date	Prins Friso	Third rate		Harlingen	Dutch Republic	For Dutch Navy.
Unknown date	Queenborough	Sixth rate	William Bagwell	Sheerness	England	For Royal Navy.
Unknown date	Schoonoord	Fifth rate frigate	Hendrik Cardinaal	Amsterdam	Dutch Republic	For Dutch Navy.
Unknown date	Seahorse	Sixth rate	John Haydon	Limehouse	England	For Royal Navy.
Unknown date	Spion	Full-rigged ship		Dunkerque	Kingdom of France	For Dutch Navy.
Unknown date	Squirrel	Yacht	Robert Lee	Chatham Dockyard	England	For Royal Navy.
Unknown date	Star	Fourth rate		Dunkerque	Kingdom of France	For Dutch Republic Navy.
Unknown date	Sviatoe Prorochestvro	Fourth rate frigate	Rotterdam Naval Yard	Rotterdam	Dutch Republic	For Imperial Russian Navy.
Unknown date	Terrible	Fifth rate fireship	Thomas Ellis	Shoreham-by-Sea	England	For Royal Navy.
Unknown date	Wapen van Friesland	Fourth rate			Dutch Republic	For Dutch Navy.
Unknown date	Windhond	Sixth rate			Dutch Republic	For Dutch Navy.
Unknown date	Zeven Provincen	First rate	Van Leeuwen	Rotterdam	Dutch Republic	For Dutch Navy.
Unknown date	Zon	Fourth rate	Hendrik Cardinaal	Amsterdam	Dutch Republic	For Dutch Republic Navy.
