= Siege of Port Royal (1710) =

Part of Queen Anne's War

- Part of Queen Anne's War
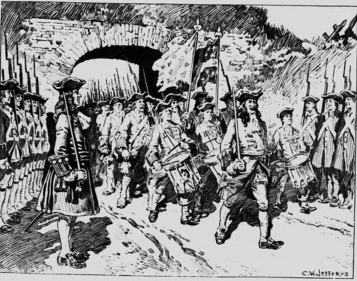
- Evacuation of Port Royal, 1710 by CW Jefferys
Date	5–13 October 1710
Location	Port Royal, Acadia (present-day Nova Scotia) 44°44′30″N 65°31′7″W
Result	British victory

Belligerents
Great Britain: Haudenosaunee	France: Acadians; Wabanaki Confederacy; Mi'kmaq; Abenaki

Commanders and leaders
Francis Nicholson; Samuel Vetch	Daniel d'Auger de Subercase; Simon-Pierre Denys de Bonaventure

Strength
About 2,000 regular and provincial soldiers	Fewer than 300

Casualties and losses
Unknown	Unknown

The siege of Port Royal (5–13 October 1710), (Note: Dates in this article are given in the New Style; many older English accounts use Old Style dates for this action: 24 September to 2 October) also known as the Conquest of Acadia, was a military siege conducted by British regular and provincial forces under the command of Francis Nicholson against a French Acadian garrison and the Wabanaki Confederacy under the command of Daniel d'Auger de Subercase, at the Acadian capital, Port Royal. The successful British siege marked the beginning of permanent British control over the peninsular portion of Acadia, which had been referred to as Nova Scotia by the British since 1621. It was the first time the British permanently took and held a French colonial possession. (Note: According to Grenier (2008), p. 12, prior to 1710, English forces had only raided, sacked, and temporarily occupied French colonial possessions. Other territories the English conquered came at the expense of other nations or aboriginals.) After the French surrender, the British occupied the fort in the capital with all the pomp and ceremony of having captured one of the great fortresses of Europe, and renamed it Annapolis Royal.

The siege was the third British attempt during Queen Anne's War to capture the Acadian capital, and it had profound consequences over the next 50 years. The conquest was a key element in the framing of the North American issues in French-British treaty negotiations of 1711–1713. It resulted in the creation of a new colony—Nova Scotia—and introduced significant questions concerning the fate of both the Acadians and the Mi'kmaq (Note: For "Mi'kmaq" versus "Micmac" or other potential transliterations, see the article Mi'kmaq people.) who continued to occupy Acadia. The Conquest of Acadia was a foundational moment in the history of the Canadian state—it was a precursor to the British conquest of New France in the middle of the century.

== Background ==
Port Royal was the capital of the French colony of Acadia almost since the French first began settling the area in 1604. It consequently became a focal point for conflict between English and French colonists in the next century. It was destroyed in 1613 by English raiders led by Samuel Argall, but eventually rebuilt. In 1690, it was captured by forces from the Province of Massachusetts Bay, although it was restored to France by the Treaty of Ryswick.

=== Early expeditions ===
With the outbreak of the War of the Spanish Succession in 1702, colonists on both sides again prepared for conflict. Acadia's governor, Jacques-François de Monbeton de Brouillan, had, in anticipation of war, already begun construction of a stone and earth fort in 1701, which was largely completed by 1704. Following a French raid on Deerfield on the Massachusetts frontier in February 1704, the English in Boston organized a raid against Acadia the following May. Led by Benjamin Church, they raided Grand Pré and other Acadian communities. English and French accounts differ on whether Church's expedition mounted an attack on Port Royal. Church's account indicates that they anchored in the harbour and considered making an attack, but ultimately decided against the idea; French accounts claim that a minor attack was made.

When Daniel d'Auger de Subercase became governor of Acadia in 1706, he went on the offensive, encouraging aboriginal raids against English targets in New England. He also encouraged privateering from Port Royal against English colonial shipping. The privateers were highly effective; the English fishing fleet on the Grand Banks was reduced by 80 percent between 1702 and 1707, and some English coastal communities were raided.

English merchants in Boston had long traded with Port Royal, and some of this activity had continued illegally after the war began. However, the business was being hurt by the war, and some merchants began making vocal calls for action, and public outrage rose over the failure of the Massachusetts defenses to stop the French and aboriginal raids. Massachusetts Bay Governor Joseph Dudley had made repeated requests to London for support without any success, and finally decided to act independently to fend off accusations of complicity in the illegal trade. In spring of 1707, he authorized an expedition against Port Royal. This expedition made two separate attempts to take Port Royal; for a variety of reasons, both attempts failed despite the expedition's significant numerical superiority.

=== British expedition organized ===
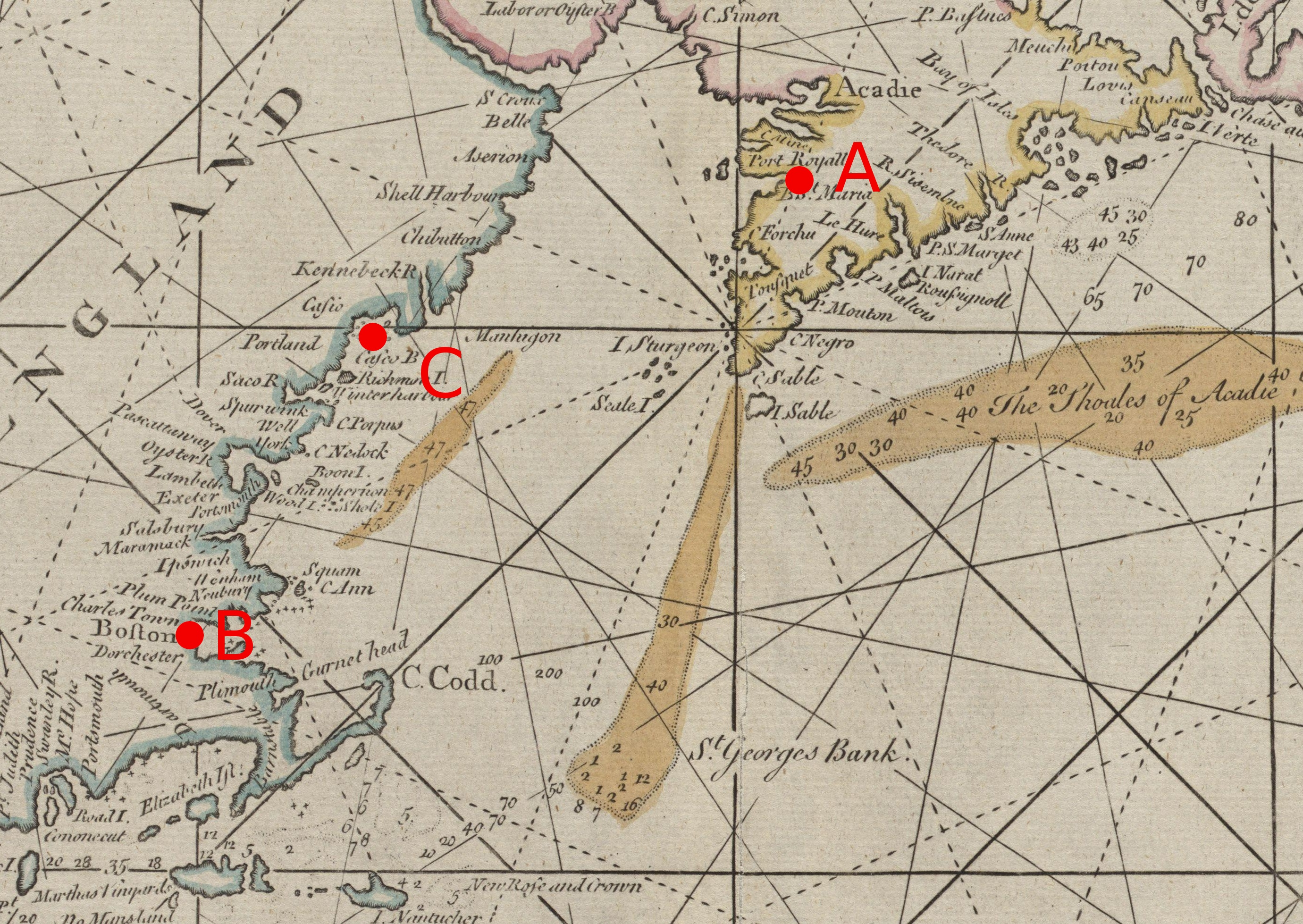
Annotated detail from a 1713 map showing eastern New England and southern Nova Scotia/Acadia. Port Royal is at A, Boston at B, and Casco Bay at C.

In the following years, France failed to send any significant support, while the British mobilized larger and better-organized forces for the conflict in North America. Samuel Vetch, a Scots businessman with colonial ties, went to London in 1708 and lobbied Queen Anne for military support to conquer all of New France. She authorized a "great enterprise" to conquer all of Acadia and Canada in 1709 that was aborted when the promised military support failed to materialize. Vetch and Francis Nicholson, an Englishman who had previously served as colonial governor of Maryland and Virginia, returned to England in its aftermath, and again appealed to the queen for support. They were accompanied by four aboriginal chiefs, who caused a sensation in London. Nicholson and Vetch successfully argued on behalf of colonial interests for British military support against Port Royal.

Nicholson arrived in Boston on 15 July 1710, bearing a commission from the queen as "General and Commander-in-Chief of all and sundry the Forces, to be employed in the expedition design'd for the reducing of Port Royal in Nova Scotia". In addition to 400 marines brought over from England, four New England provinces raised militia regiments: Massachusetts Bay provided 900, Rhode Island 180, Connecticut 300, and New Hampshire 100. Some of the provincial troops were drilled in the arts of siege warfare by Paul Mascarene, a Huguenot officer in the British Army. A band of Haudenosaunee was also recruited to serve as scouts on the expedition. When the fleet sailed on 29 September, it consisted of 36 transports, two bomb galleys, and five warships. Two ships, HMS Falmouth and HMS Dragon, were sent from England, while HMS Feversham and HMS Lowestoft were sent from New York to join with HMS Chester, which was already stationed at Boston. Nicholson sent HMS Chester ahead of the fleet to blockade the Digby Gut, which controlled naval access to Port Royal.

=== Port Royal defences ===
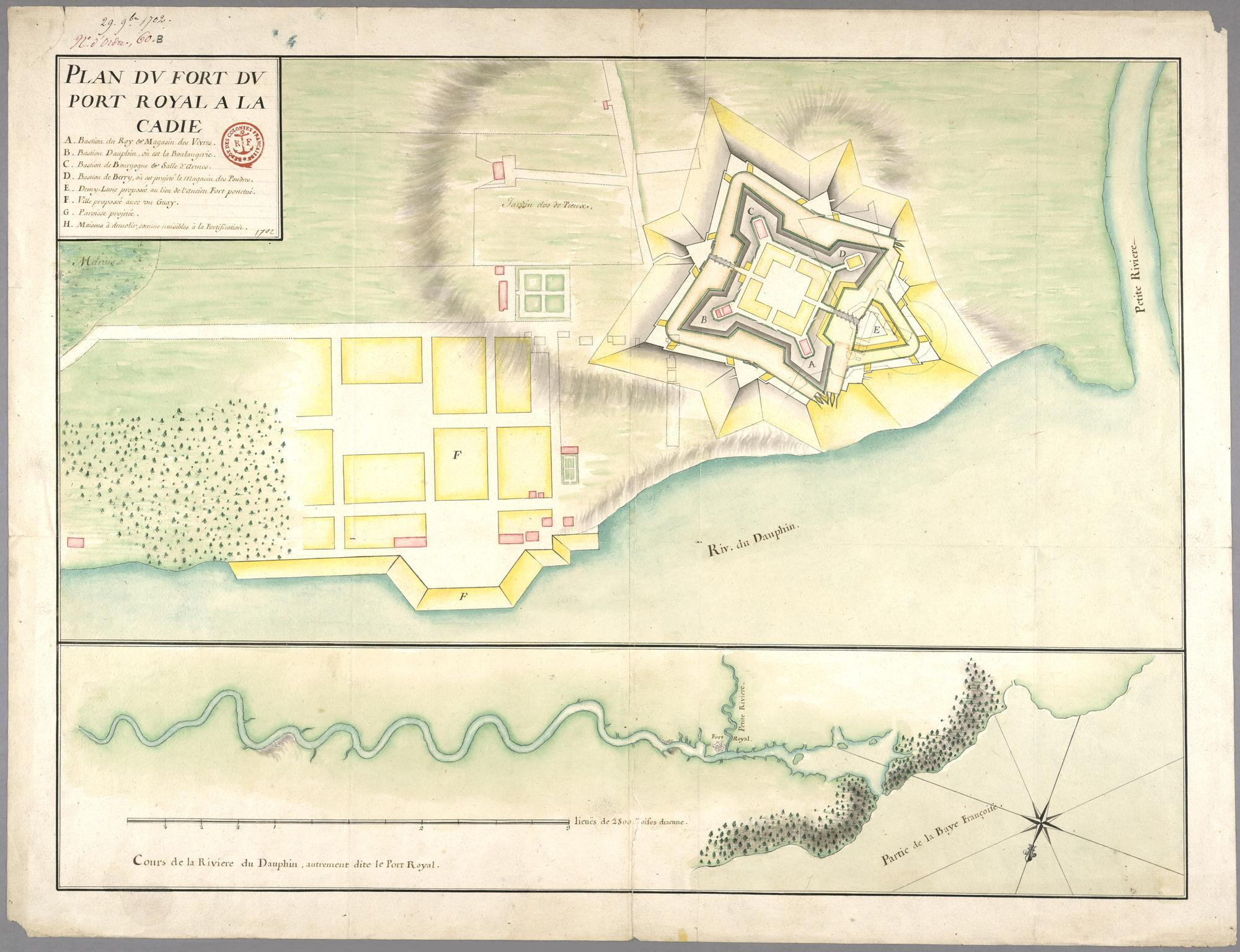
Military engineer's drawing of Port Royal, 1702

Port Royal was defended by about 300 troops, many of whom were poorly trained recruits from France. Subercase had taken steps to improve the local defences since the 1707 sieges, building a new bomb-proof powder magazine and barracks in 1708, and clearing woods from the river banks to deny attackers cover. He completed the construction of another vessel to assist in naval defence, and engaged privateers with great success against New England fishing and shipping. From prisoners taken by the privateers he learned that plans were continually being made in 1708 and 1709 for new attempts on Port Royal.

== Siege ==
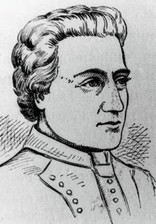
Daniel d'Auger de Subercase, governor of Acadia 1706–1710

As the fleet sailed north, it was met by a dispatch vessel sent by Thomas Matthews, captain of the Chester. She carried deserters from the French garrison, who reported that morale was extremely low. Nicholson sent the ship ahead with one of the transports; when they entered Digby Gut they received some fire from parties of Mi'kmaq on the shore. The ships returned fire with their cannons, without either side taking casualties. On 5 October, the main British fleet arrived at Goat Island, about 10 kilometres (6.2 mi) below Port Royal. That afternoon, the transport Caesar ran aground while attempting to enter the Annapolis River, and was eventually swept onto the rocks. Its captain, some of its crew, and 23 soldiers died, while a company commander and some 25 others struggled ashore.

The following day, 6 October, British marines began landing both north and south of the fortress and the town. The northern force was joined by four New England regiments under Colonel Vetch, while Nicholson led the remaining New England troops as part of the southern force. The landings took place without incident, with fire from the fort answered by one of the fleet's bomb ships at long range. Although later accounts of the siege claimed Vetch's detachment was part of a strategic plan to surround the fort, contemporary accounts report that Vetch wanted to have a command that was somewhat independent of Nicholson. These same accounts claim Vetch never got to within range of the fort's guns until after the siege ended; his attempts to erect a battery of mortars in a muddy area across Allain's Creek from the fort was repulsed by cannon fire. The southern force met with guerrilla-style resistance outside the fort, with Acadian and aboriginal defenders firing small arms from houses and wooded areas, in addition to taking fire from the fort. This fire resulted in three British killed, but the defenders were unable to keep the British on the south side from establishing a camp about 400 yards (370 m) from the fort.

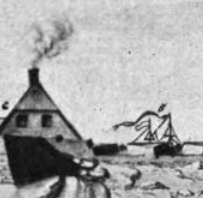
Province Galley (ship), Commander Cyprian Southack

Over the next four days the British landed their cannons and brought them up to the camp. Fire from the fort and supporters outside it persisted, and the British bomb ships wrought havoc within the fort with their fire each night. With the opening of new British batteries imminent, Subercase sent out an officer with a parley flag on 10 October. The negotiations got off to a bad start because the officer was not properly announced by a drummer, and deteriorated from there. Each side ended up holding an officer of the other, principally over matters of military etiquette, and the British continued their siege work.

By 12 October, the siege trenches had advanced, and cannons that were within 300 feet (91 m) of the fort opened fire. Nicholson sent Subercase a demand that he surrender, and negotiations began once more. By the end of the day, the parties reached an agreement on the terms of surrender, which was formally signed the next day. The garrison was allowed to leave the fort with all the honours of war, "their Arms and Baggage, Drums beating, and Colours flying." The British were to transport the garrison to France, and there were specific protections in the capitulation to protect the local residents. These terms called for the "Inhabitants within Cannon shot of the Fort" to be allowed to remain on their properties for up to two years if they so chose, provided they were willing to take an oath to the British Crown.

== Aftermath ==
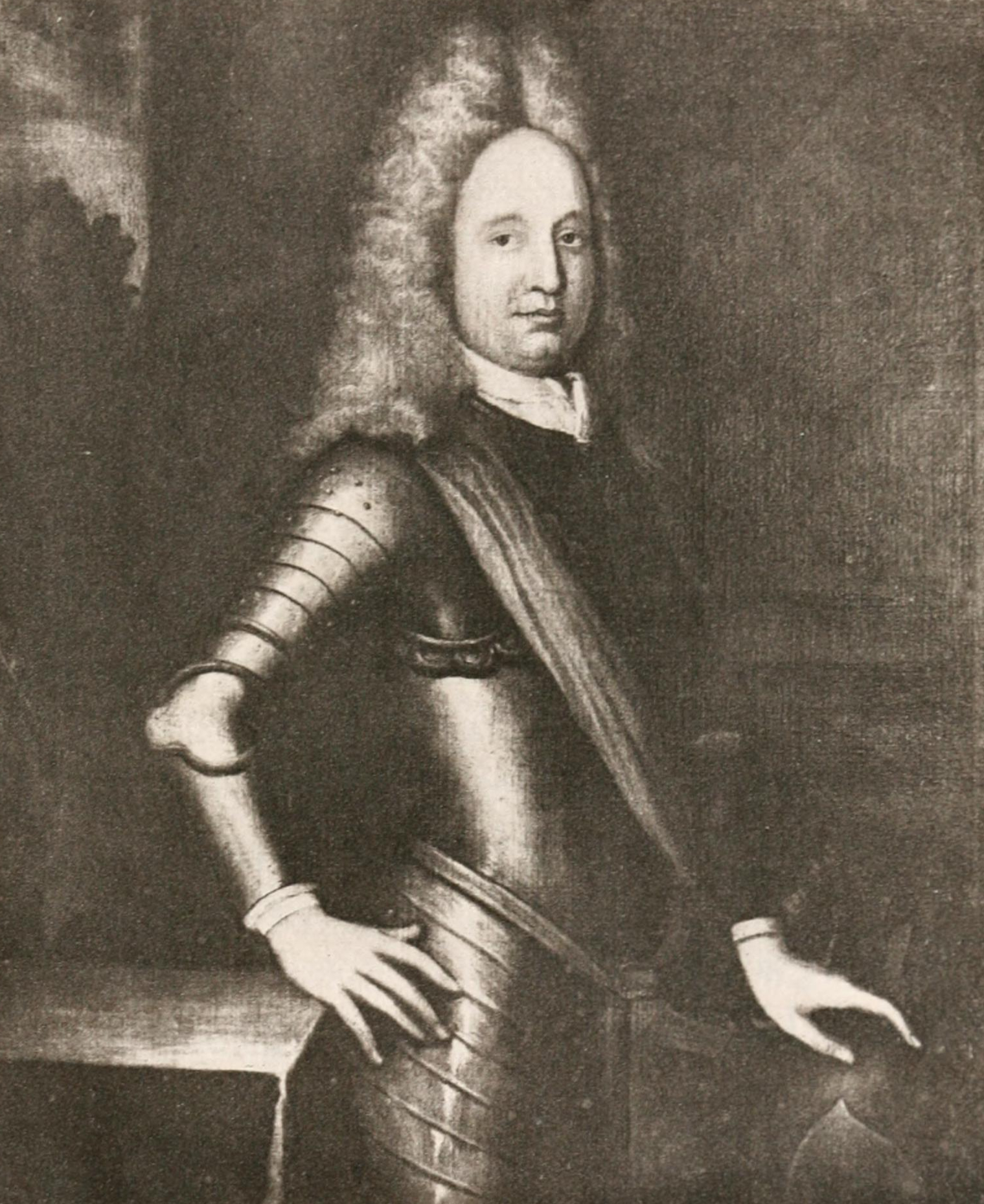
Samuel Vetch became the first governor of Nova Scotia.

The British took formal possession of Port Royal following a ceremony on 16 October, in which they renamed the place Annapolis Royal in honour of their queen. Samuel Vetch was inaugurated as the new governor of Nova Scotia. Massachusetts and New Hampshire proclaimed a day of public thanksgiving. The first French attempt to retake Annapolis Royal happened the next year. After a skirmish in which a party of New England provincial troops was ambushed, Bernard-Anselme d'Abbadie de Saint-Castin lead a force of 200 Acadians and native warriors in a siege of the fort, without success.

The capture of Port Royal marked the end of French rule in peninsular Acadia, and inaugurated a struggle for control of the territory that lasted until the British conquests of the Seven Years' War. The status of Acadia was one of the more contentious issues in the negotiations leading to the 1713 Treaty of Utrecht, and very nearly led to renewed war. French negotiators were unable to recover Acadia, although they were able to retain Isle Saint-Jean (present-day Prince Edward Island) and Île Royale, (present day Cape Breton Island), which provided access to the important Atlantic fisheries.

Acadia's people were placed in a difficult position by the conquest. The British on numerous occasions demanded they take oaths to the British Crown, but many refused to take oaths requiring them to take arms against the French, preferring to proclaim their neutrality. For this and other reasons, hundreds of Acadians left peninsular Nova Scotia over the next decade. Most of them avoided the principal French colonial settlements and went to French-occupied Isle Saint-Jean. Acadia's border was not formally demarcated by the Treaty of Utrecht, which became a cause of ongoing friction between the British and French, especially on the Isthmus of Chignecto, which both sides eventually fortified. The French interpreted the phrase ancient boundaries to imply only the peninsula of present-day Nova Scotia, thereby excluding the mainland between New England and the St. Lawrence, ÎLe St. Jean, and Cape Breton. This helped the aboriginal groups of Abenaquis, Malecites, and Mi'kmaq to retain their sovereignty over their old hunting grounds.

In 1746, the grand expedition was organized in France under the command of the Duc d'Anville. The expedition was composed of 20 warships, 21 frigates, and 32 transport ships, containing 800 cannons, 3,000 soldiers, and 10,000 marines. The expedition was to retake Louisbourg and then Annapolis Royal. However, after a three months crossing, and the dispersal of the fleet between Sable Island and the mainland, the expedition turned out to be a disaster for the French, and they would not try to recapture Port Royal again. The territorial dispute would not be fully resolved until the British conquest of New France in 1760, and the informal boundary between the British and French in the dispute (the Missaguash River) now forms the border between the Canadian provinces of Nova Scotia and New Brunswick.

== Order of battle ==
=== British forces ===
- Colonel Francis Nicholson

Fleet

- HMS Dragon, 50 guns, Captain George Martin
- HMS Falmouth, 50 guns, Captain Walter Riddell
- HMS Chester, 50 guns, Captain Thomas Mathews
- HMS Lowestoffe, 32 guns, Captain George Gordon
- HMS Feversham, 35 guns, Captain Robert Paston
- HMS Starr, Commander Thomas Rochfort
- Province Galley, Captain Cyprian Southack

Land forces

- Colonel Samuel Vetch, Adjutant General
- Captain Walter Elliot, Brigade Major
- Battalion of Marines, (Note: Made up of detachments from Holt's, Will's, Fox's, Shannon's, and Churchill's regiments of marines.) Colonel Robert Reading
- Hobby's Regiment (Massachusetts Bay), Colonel Sir Charles Hobby.
- Tailer's Regiment (Massachusetts Bay), Colonel William Tailer.
- Whiting's Regiment (Connecticut), Colonel William Whiting.
- Walton's Regiment (New Hampshire), Colonel Shadrach Walton.
- Company of Gunner and Matrosses, Colonel Samuel Vetch, Captain.
- Company of Indian Scouts (Haudenosaunee), Major of Scouts John Livingston, Captain.

=== French forces ===
- Captain Daniel d'Auger de Subercase, Governor of Acadia
- 150 soldiers of the Compagnies Franches de la Marine
- 100 men of the Acadian Militia
- Some Canadians
- Some privateers

== See also ==
- Military history of the Mi’kmaq People
- Military history of the Acadians
- Military history of Nova Scotia
