= French ship Fier =

At least two ships of the French Navy have been named Fier :

- Fier launched in 1694 and broken up in 1715
- Fier launched in 1745 and sold in 1782
