= Raid on Grand Pré =

Raiding Expedition of Queen Anne's War

Coordinates: 45°6′18.14″N 64°17′55.26″W

- Part of Queen Anne's War
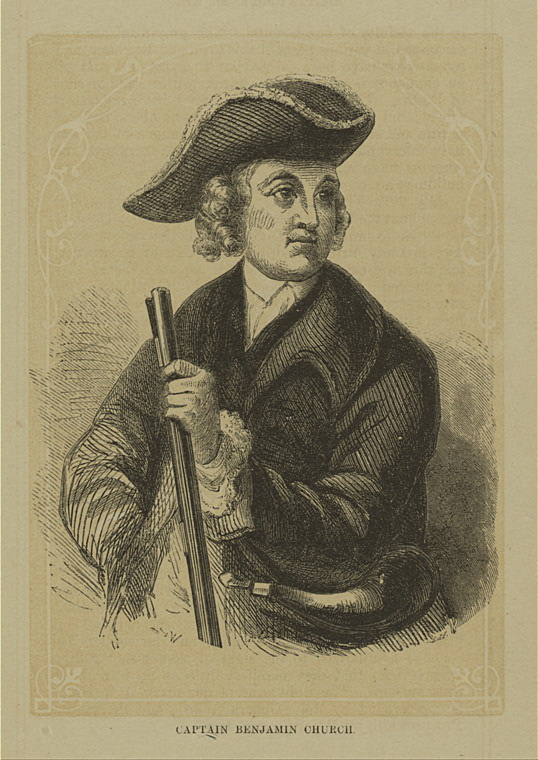
- Colonel Benjamin Church, the "Father of American ranging"
Date	24–26 June (3–5 July New Style) 1704 (Note: English records, including Church's accounts, record the dates of these events in the Julian calendar, while French records have them in the Gregorian calendar. At the time, the Gregorian dates were 11 days later than the Julian dates; dates in this article are in the Julian calendar unless both dates are provided.)
Location	Grand-Pré, Acadia (present-day Nova Scotia)
Result	English and allied victory

Belligerents
Kingdom of France: Acadia; Indian allies: Mi'kmaq Tribe	Kingdom of England: New England; Indian allies

Commanders and leaders
Unknown	Benjamin Church; John Gorham (Grandfather of John Gorham); Winthrop Hilton; Cyprian Southack

Strength
Unknown	500 volunteers and warriors

Casualties and losses
About 6 killed, unknown wounded 45 captured	6 killed, unknown wounded

The Raid on Grand Pré was the major action of a raiding expedition conducted by the New England militia Colonel Benjamin Church against French Acadia in June 1704, during Queen Anne's War. The expedition was allegedly in retaliation for a French and Indian raid against the Massachusetts frontier community of Deerfield earlier that year.

Departing Boston on 25 May 1704 with 500 provincial militia and some Indian allies, the expedition reached the Minas Basin on 24 June, after raiding smaller settlements at Penobscot Bay and Passamaquoddy Bay. Although he lost surprise due to the famously high tides of the Bay of Fundy, Church quickly gained control of Grand-Pré, and spent three days destroying the town and attempting to destroy the dikes and levees that protected its croplands. The croplands were flooded by salt water, but the local Acadians quickly repaired the dikes after the raiders left, and the land was returned to production. Church continued his raiding expedition, striking at Beaubassin and other communities before finally returning to Boston in late July.

== Context ==
When the War of the Spanish Succession (also called Queen Anne's War) widened to include England in 1702, it spawned conflict between the colonies of England and France in North America. Joseph Dudley, the governor of the English Province of Massachusetts Bay (which then included present-day Maine), sought in June 1703 to ensure the neutrality of the Abenakis who occupied the frontier between Massachusetts and New France. In this he was unsuccessful, because New France's Governor Philippe de Rigaud Vaudreuil, knowing he would have to rely on Indian support for defense against the more numerous English, had already encouraged the Indians to take up the hatchet. Following the Wabanaki Confederacy of Acadia military campaign against the New England frontier during the summer of 1703, the English colonists embarked on largely unsuccessful retaliatory raids against Abenaki villages. This prompted the Abenakis to participate in a raid on Deerfield, Massachusetts under French leadership in February 1704. The severity of this raid (more than 50 villagers killed and more than 100 captured) prompted calls for revenge, and the veteran Indian fighter Benjamin Church offered his services for an expedition against the French colony of Acadia (roughly present-day Nova Scotia, New Brunswick, and eastern Maine).

Acadia was at the time dominated by a series of settlements dotting the shores of the Bay of Fundy and its adjacent bays. Its principal settlement and capital, Port Royal, was the only significantly fortified community, defended by a star fort with a modest garrison. The land at the top of the bay, on the shores of the Minas and Cumberland Basins was one of the major seats of food production in the colony, and Grand Pré was one of the largest and most successful communities on the Minas Basin, with a population of about 500 in 1701. French settlers to the area had brought with them knowledge on the constructions of dikes and levees, which they used to drain marshlands for agriculture, and to protect those lands from the inflow of the exceptionally high tides (over 6 meters, or 20 feet, in some places) for which the Bay of Fundy is well known. The community of Beaubassin was the largest of several towns situated on the Isthmus of Chignecto and elsewhere on the shores of the Cumberland Basin.

== Start of the expedition ==
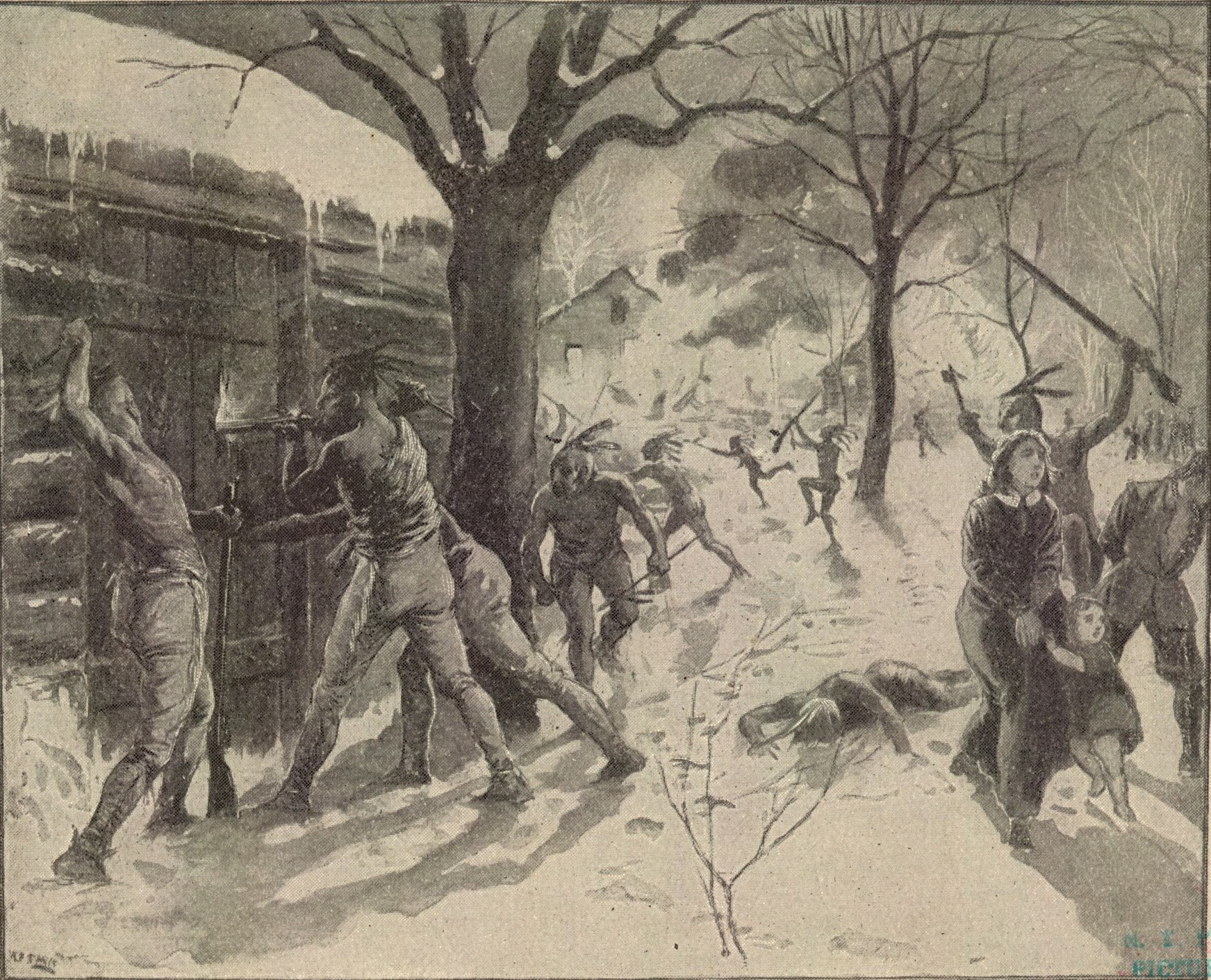
Grand Pré was raided in retaliation for the Raid on Deerfield, depicted here

Church had previously led expeditions against Acadia during King William's War, and Governor Dudley issued him a colonel's commission for the effort, giving him specific orders to obtain Acadian prisoners that could be exchanged for the English prisoners taken in the Deerfield raid. The expedition was also to be one of punishment: "Use all possible methods for the burning and destroying of the enemies houses and breaking the dams of their corn grounds, and make what other spoil you can upon them". Dudley, however, specifically denied Church permission to attack Port Royal, the Acadian capital, citing the need to get permission from London before taking such a step.

The force Church raised consisted of about 500 volunteers from coastal areas of Massachusetts, including some Indians. He left Boston on 15/26 May with fourteen transports and three warships. The warships include the Royal Navy vessels HMS Adventure, HMS Jersey (42 guns) and HMS Gosport (32), which were also accompanied by the Massachusetts ketch Province Galley under Cyprian Southack's command. (Church took a former prisoner of the Maliseet, John Gyles as his translator.)

The expedition first sailed for Mount Desert Island, near the entrance to Penobscot Bay. Church sent a force to raid Pentagoet (present-day Castine, Maine), where the Frenchman Baron Saint-Castin had a fortified trading post. Saint-Castin was absent, but Church took prisoner his daughter and her children. He also learned that a new French settlement was being built at Passamaquoddy Bay, so the expedition next sailed for that destination. Church sent a small force ashore near present-day St. Stephen, New Brunswick, where they destroyed a house and raided a nearby Maliseet encampment, killing one Indian. Church then separated the warships, sending them to blockade the Digby Gut in the hopes of capturing a French supply ship, while the bulk of the expedition sailed for Grand Pré. The three ship captains on 24 June demanded the surrender of the garrison at Port Royal, threatening a frontal assault with 1,700 New Englanders and "Sauvages". Governor Jacques-François de Monbeton de Brouillan, despite defenses in poor conditions and a garrison of only 150 able men, saw through the bluff and refused. Historian George Rawlyk speculates that Governor Dudley may have intentionally asked them to make this bluff without Church's involvement.

== Grand Pré ==
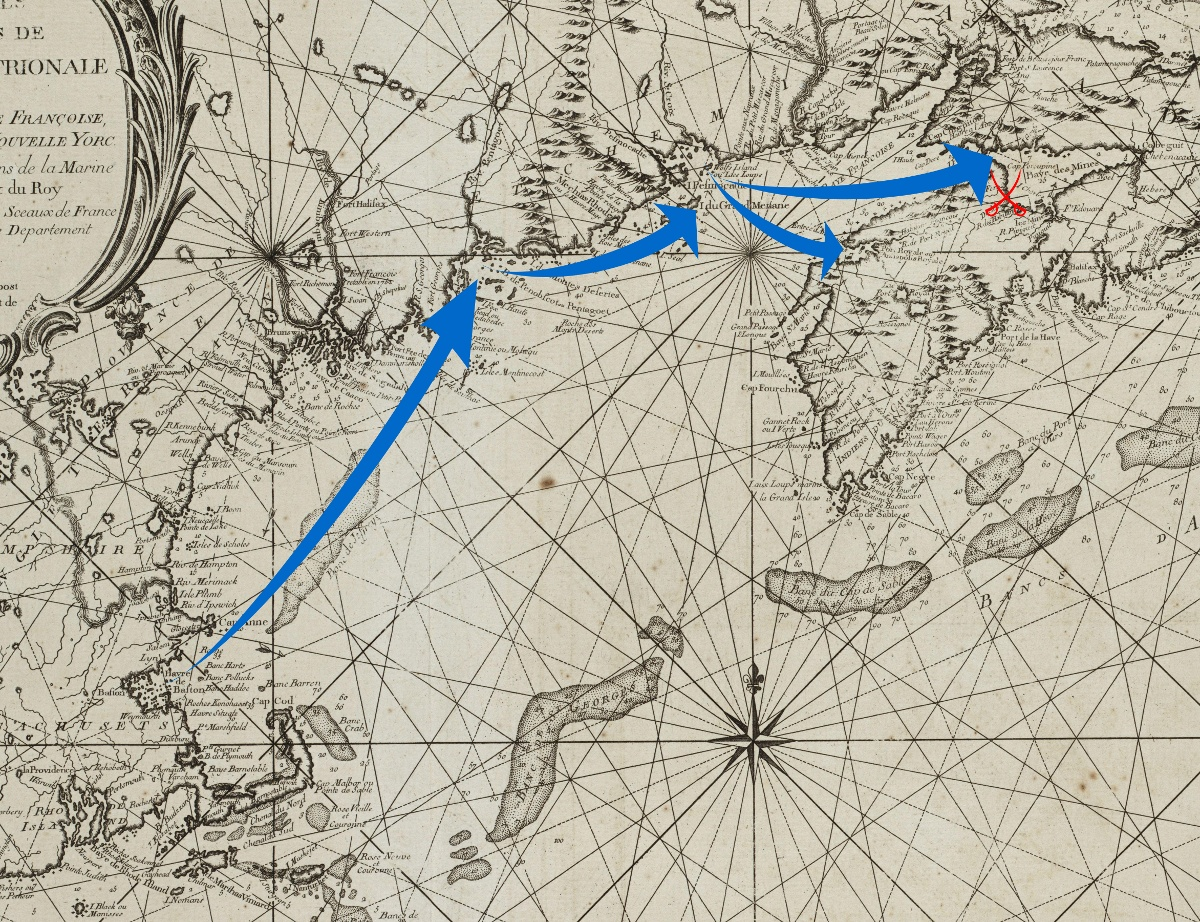
Detail from an 18th-century map showing the English expedition's movements up to its arrival at Grand Pré and Port Royal

The principal detailed account of these events was provided by Colonel Church in his memoirs, first published in 1716. French military officers later summarized the damage caused by the raiders.

=== Day 1: Arrival ===
On 24 June/3 July 1704, Church arrived at Grand Pré on the frigate Adventure. Hoping to take advantage of the element of surprise, Church secretly approached the village from behind the heavily wooded Boot Island. His men unloaded the whaleboats to go ashore late in the day and started to move quickly toward the village. Church sent Lieut. Giles ahead with a flag of truce and a written notice demanding the village's complete surrender.

We do also declare, that we have already made some beginnings of killing and scalping some Canada men, which we have not been wont to do or allow, and are now come with a great number of English and Indians, all volunteers, with resolutions to subdue you, and make you sensible of your cruelties to us, by treating you after the same manner.

— Proclamation of Benjamin Church

Church stipulated the Acadians and Mi'kmaq had one hour to surrender. Although he expected to reach the village by the time the hour had past, Church's force became delayed by stream crossings made more difficult by the receding tide: "But meeting with several creeks near twenty or thirty feet deep, which were very muddy and dirty, so that the army could not get over them, were obliged to return to their boats again."

Because Church's forces were stuck in the mud exposed by the retreating tide, they lost any element of surprise, and the Acadians took the opportunity to evacuate Grand Pré with some of their cattle and the "best of their goods". Church's forces waited in their boats for the tide to rise. Church expected the high stream banks to provide some cover, but when tide rose that night, it was so high that the boats were exposed to gunfire from the local militia, who had gathered in the woods along the banks. According to Church, the Acadians and Mi'kmaq "fired smartly at our forces". Church had a small cannon on his boat, which he used to fire grape shot at the attackers on the shore, who withdrew, suffering one Mi'kmaq killed and several wounded. Church's forces then waited out the rest of the night.

=== Day 2: Inhabitants driven off ===
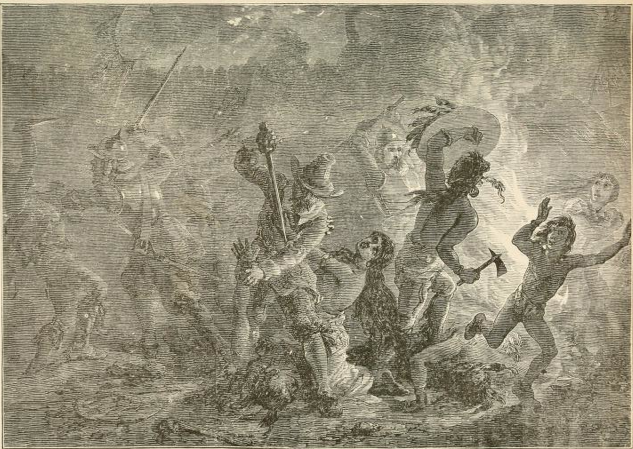
Raid on Grand Pre (1704)

Having withdrawn from the village, the next morning the Acadian and Mi'kmaq militia waited in the woods for Church and his men to arrive. At the break of day, the New Englanders again set off toward the village, under orders from Church to drive any resistance before them. The largest body of defenders fired on the raiders' right flank from behind trees and logs, but their fire was ineffective and they were driven off. The raiders then entered the village and began plundering. Some of the men broke into the liquor stores they found and began drinking, but Colonel Church quickly put a stop to that activity. They spent the rest of the day destroying much of the village. According to one of Church's dispatches, they destroyed 60 houses, 6 mills, and many barns, along with about 70 cattle.

At one point some of the men noticed that some of the Acadians were nearby, driving off some of their cattle. Church detached Lieutenant Barker and some men to give chase, warning them to advance with care. However, Barker was somewhat rash in pursuing the chase, and he and another man were killed before the raiders retreated back to the village.

That evening the raiders built a fortification out of logs while burning the church and the rest of the village. Church reported that "the whole town seemed to be on fire all at once." All but one home was burned.

=== Day 3: Destruction of the harvest ===
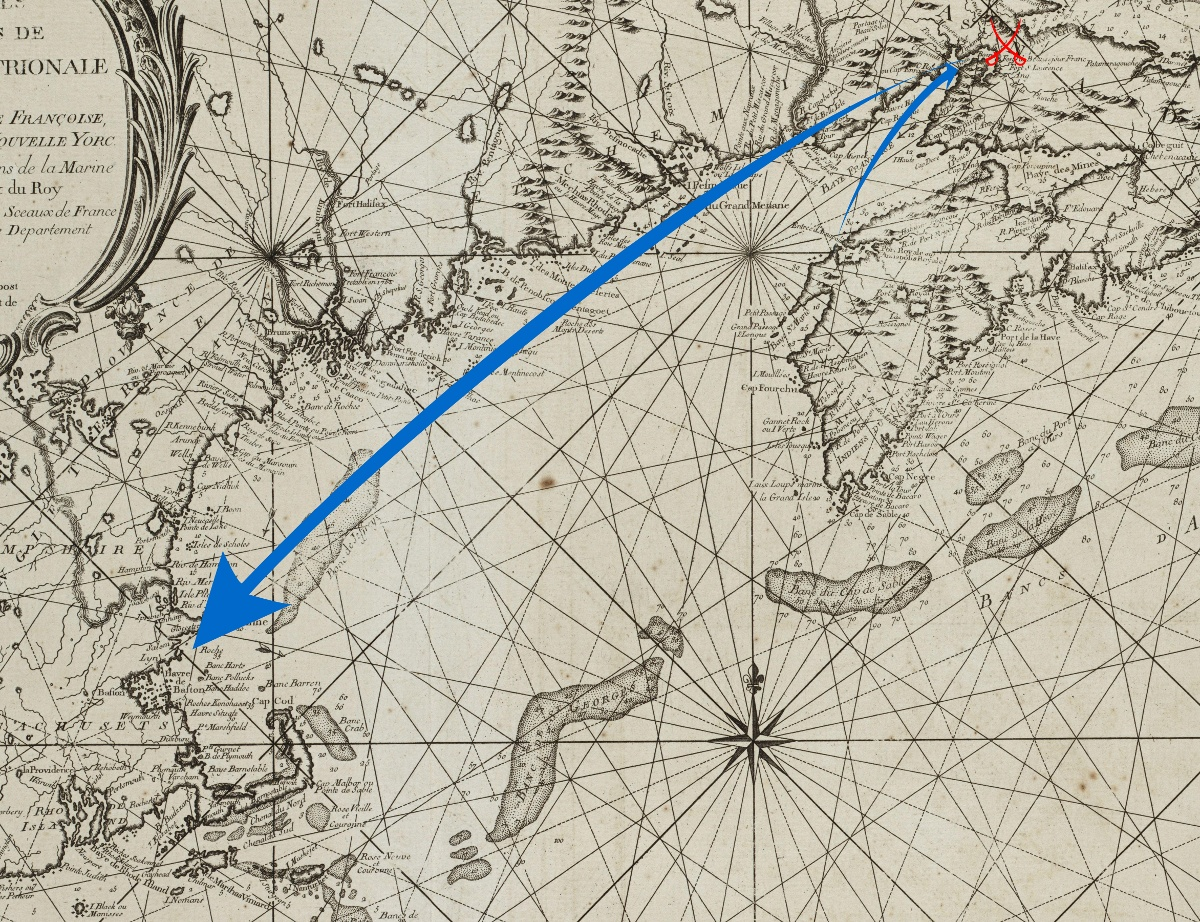
Detail from an 18th-century map annotated to show the English expedition's movements after the raid

On the morning of the third day, Church gave the orders to destroy the dykes and, in turn, all of the crops. Seven dykes were broken, destroying most of the harvest and ruining over 200 hogsheads of stored wheat.

To give the impression to the Acadians and Mi'kmaq that his forces were leaving, Church had his soldiers burn the fortifications they had built the day before. He also had them load themselves and the whale boats back onto their transport vessels. Some of the Acadians returned in the night and immediately began to mend the broken dykes. However, Church had anticipated this, and sent men back to the town to drive the Acadians off.

== End of the expedition ==
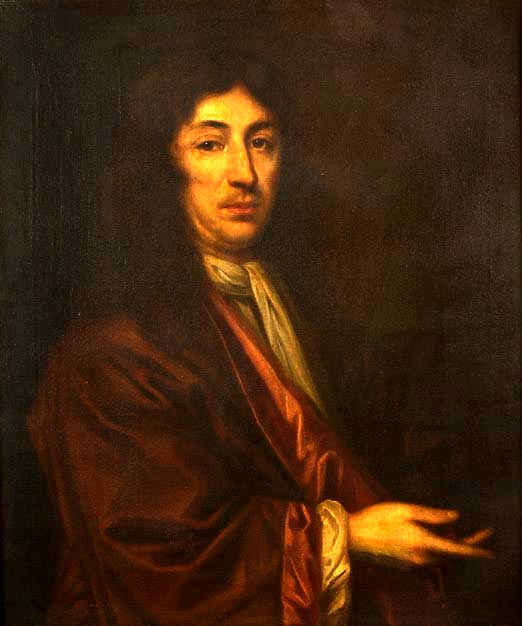
Governor of Massachusetts Joseph Dudley

The next day Church left Grand Pré and went on to raid Pisiguit (present day Windsor and Falmouth, Nova Scotia, not far from Grand Pré), where he took 45 prisoners. He then sailed for Port Royal to rejoin the fleet blockading Port Royal. According to uncorroborated French reports, the blockaders had made some landings in the vicinity of Port Royal, burning a few isolated houses and taking some prisoners. Governor Brouillan organized defenses that successfully prevented further landings.

After rejoining the warships, Church held a council to discuss whether or not to launch a large-scale attack against Port Royal. The council decided that their force was "inferiour to the strength of the enemy", and that they would "quit it [Port Royal] wholly and go about [their] other business". The expedition then sailed back up the Bay of Fundy to Chignecto, where the village of Beaubassin was raided. Its inhabitants had by then been alerted to the English activities, and under the leadership of Father Claude Trouve had removed their possessions and as much livestock as possible from the village to Chedabucto (Guysborough, Nova Scotia). Church, after some ineffectual skirmishing with villagers hiding in the woods, burned the village's houses and barns and slaughtered 100 head of cattle, before sailing for Boston. Church reported that six of his men were killed over the course of the expedition.

== Aftermath ==
The prisoners that Church took were brought to Boston, where they were at first given relatively free access to the town. The town selectman complained, and the Acadians were then confined to Castle William. They were exchanged in 1705 and 1706 for prisoners taken in the Deerfield raid, although the negotiations were complicated by Dudley's initial refusal to release the noted French privateer Pierre Maisonnat dit Baptiste, who was ultimately exchanged, along with Noel Doiron and other captives, for Deerfield's minister John Williams.

The direct effects of the raid were fairly short-lived. Because of the destruction of the crop and stored grain, the colony suffered a flour shortage that winter, although it was not severe enough to cause significant hardship. Grand Pré was rebuilt, the dykes were repaired, and there was a successful harvest in 1706. The memory of the raid however, lasted in the population. As late as the 1740s (after Acadia had become British Nova Scotia) Grand Pré's inhabitants worried about a return of English raiders, and were cautious in their dealing with British authorities.

Dudley's decision to deny Church permission to attack Port Royal had political ramifications: his opponents in Massachusetts accused him of protecting Port Royal because he was benefiting from illicit trade with Acadia. These allegations continued for several years, and Dudley eventually chose to deal with them by launching the failed attacks on Port Royal in 1707.

== See also ==
- Military history of Nova Scotia
- Military history of the Acadians
- Military history of the Miꞌkmaq
