= Pierre Morpain =

Pierre Morpain (c. 1686 - 20 August 1749) was a French ship's captain, privateer, and naval officer. Active in the waters of the West Indies, Morpain is best known for a highly successful privateering career along the coast of Acadia (and later Nova Scotia) during Queen Anne's War and King George's War. He notably made a providential arrival, with supply-laden prizes in tow, at the Acadian capital, Port Royal, not long after the first 1707 siege. In his later years he participated as a military commander in the defence of Fortress Louisbourg during the 1745 siege.

== Early life ==
Pierre Morpain was born in Blaye, a community on the Gironde in southwestern France, in roughly 1686. His father, Jacques Morpain, was a local businessman. Both parents died when he was young, and by 1703 he was serving at sea. In 1706 he was given command of the Intrépide, based in the West Indies at Cap-Français (present-day Cap-Haïtien), with instructions to interfere with British shipping. In 1707 he cruised as far north as New England, where he captured two prizes: a ship full of provisions, and a slave ship. Since France and England were then at war, he made for the nearest safe port, which was Port Royal, the capital of Acadia. Unknown to Morpain, an English colonial force had recently abandoned a siege there, and the town was in desperate need of supplies. Morpain generously offered his captured stores to the town, winning the gratitude of Acadia's Governor Daniel d'Auger de Subercase. Fearing a renewed attack, Subercase asked Morpain to stay; the English returned in late August, and Morpain and his ship's crew assisted the Acadians in driving the besiegers off.

After returning to the West Indies, Morpain was given command of a naval vessel, the Marquis de Choiseul, that was under the authority of Saint-Domingue's governor. At the urging of Subercase, Morpain sailed north to engage in privateering in the waters of New England and Acadia in 1709. While there he married Marie-Joseph de Chauffours, daughter of Louis Damours de Chauffours, an Acadian settler. His privateering was highly successful, building a reputation with both the French authorities and New England sailing interests. When the English failed to attack Port Royal in 1709, Morpain returned briefly to the West Indies to return his employer's vessel.

He then settled in Plaisance, Newfoundland, where he was joined by his wife, and he again took up privateering. In 1711 a French-Indian force besieged Annapolis Royal but lacked armaments to attack the fort. Following a request they made to Newfoundland's governor, Morpain loaded his ship with supplies and munitions and sailed off to meet them. However, his ship encountered part of a major British naval expedition, and was captured after three hours' battle. Imprisoned at St. John's, he was released back to Plaisance in 1712. Later that year he returned to France, where he spent the next year; during this time he apparently sought an appointment in the naval establishment.

== Port commander at Louisbourg ==
In this he was successful: in 1715 he was appointed the port captain of what would become Fortress Louisbourg on Île-Royale (present-day Cape Breton Island). Arriving the following year, he oversaw the construction of the port facilities at Louisbourg and administered navigation in the province; in the latter role he became quite familiar with all of the local waters. By the 1740s his duties including the instruction of navigation to the colony's mariners.

With the advent of war in 1744, Morpain again took to the seas against British colonial shipping; his reputation was such that reports of the activities of "Morepang" were sufficient to keep merchant ships in port. Conditions at Louisbourg, however, were not good: the land forces stationed there were extremely discontented, and the governor, Louis Du Pont Duchambon, was faced with a mutiny in December 1744. The arrival of a British colonial force under William Pepperrell in early May 1745 forced Duchambon to turn to Morpain to lead the defences, since he could not trust many of his officers. Morpain advocated an aggressive response to British intentions to land at Gabarus Bay, south of the fort, and eventually led a small force out in an attempt to stop the landing. In this he was unsuccessful, arriving after the British had already established a small beachhead. In the ensuing skirmish, Morpain was wounded, but managed to make his way back to the fortress.

Morpain then effectively directed the defence of the fortress for the duration of the siege; his vigorous defence of the works was lauded by both the French and British forces. After the British victory, Morpain was returned to France. When Île-Royale was returned to the French after the peace, Morpain was again offered the naval post at Louisbourg; however, he died at Rochefort in August 1749 without returning to North America.
