= Cyprian Southack =

English cartographer (1662–1745)

- Born: 1662; London, England
- Died: 27 March, 1745 (aged 82–83); Boston, Massachusetts Bay, British America
- Military career
- Allegiance: Plymouth Colony (England)
- Branch: Plymouth Colony Militia
- Rank: Captain
- Conflicts: King William's War: Battle of Port Royal (1690); Battle of Chedabucto; Siege of Fort Nashwaak (1696); Queen Anne's War: Northeast Coast Campaign (1703); Raid on Grand Pré; Siege of Port Royal (1707); Siege of Port Royal (1710)
- Other work: representative

Coat of Arms of Cyprian Southack

Cyprian Southack (1662 – 27 March 1745) was an English cartographer and colonial naval commander. He commanded the Province Galley, Massachusetts' one-ship navy (1696–1711) and commanded the first navy ship of Nova Scotia, the ship William Augustus (1721–1723).

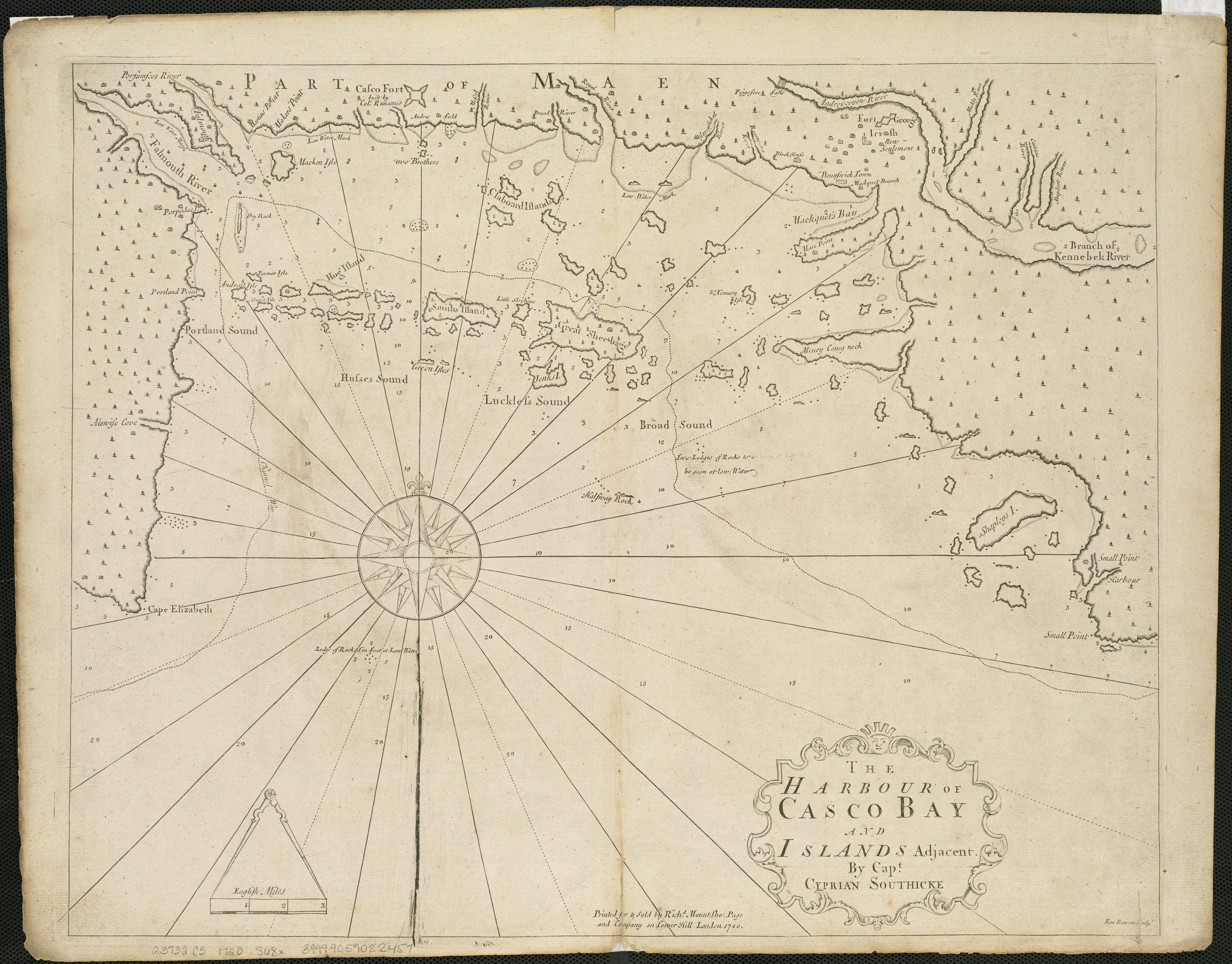
A 1720 chart by Southack, depicting Casco Bay, Maine

Born in London to a British Navy captain, he came to New England in the 1680s, where he established a reputation for his seamanship and his chart-making skills. The charts he made of the coast of northeastern North America were among the most accurate of their time. On 26 February 1692, he presented this map at Whitehall Court and was rewarded by king William III with 50 pounds and a gold medal.

He engaged in privateering activities during King William's War in the 1690s, and was hired by the Province of Massachusetts Bay as captain of its armed vessel, the Province Galley. In that role he participated in several military actions during Queen Anne's War, including relieving present-day Portland, Maine from attack before joining Benjamin Church's 1704 raids of Acadia, and the 1707 and 1710 Sieges of Port Royal in Nova Scotia. He was asked by Admiral Hovenden Walker to pilot his 1711 expedition to Quebec up the Saint Lawrence River, but refused, disclaiming detailed knowledge of that river. (Walker's expedition ended disastrously, suffering more than 800 deaths when parts of the fleet foundered on rocks near the mouth of the Saint Lawrence.)

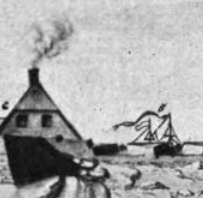
Province Galley, 1705

After Queen Anne's War Southack continued in a variety of public service positions, including a seat on the Nova Scotia Council.

A storm on the night of 26 April 1717 destroyed the galley Whydah (pronounced Wi-da), flagship of the notorious pirate Samuel Bellamy, on the shoals of Cape Cod. The ship, built in London in 1715 and named for the Kingdom of Ouidah in Africa, was a private slaver of Sir Humphry Morice on its maiden voyage in 1716 under the command of Captain Lawrence Prince; it was captured by the pirates while passing through the waters of the lower Bahamas Islands on it return voyage to England in February 1717. With the Whydah Gally as his command ship in a 5-ship fleet, Bellamy, rated the wealthiest pirate in the western hemisphere by Forbes, was sailing near to the coast of Cape Cod when a massive storm arose about midnight, which drove the Whydah into the sandbars at Wellfleet where it was dashed to pieces. Within days, news of the pirate wreck and the capture of nine survivors reached Massachusetts Bay Colony Governor Samuel Shute, and Cyprian Southack was immediately sent to the wreck site to recover anything of value, with specific orders in the name of King George I to take from the site and the local townsfolk anything that they may have taken from the wreck. According to his journal and several frustrated letters to the governor, the entire community refused to cooperate, and the Coroner even stuck him with the bill after burying 102 bodies washed ashore from the wreck. Southack informed the governor that, although he was able to see parts of the Whydah on the sandbar some 500 feet from shore, his week-long efforts to recover anything of value from the wreck were repelled by intense storms, deadly waves, and rip currents cause by the Cape's extensive sandbar shoals. His letters to the governor and his map of New England, upon which he wrote the location of the Whydah, was instrumental in explorer Barry Clifford's discovery and ongoing recovery of the Whydah's artifacts and treasures, now on display at the Whydah Pirate Museum in Provincetown on Cape Cod. Confirmation of the discovery was made in 1985 with Clifford's recovery of the ship's bell, embossed with the words "The + Whydah + Gally + 1716". It is currently the only fully authenticated Golden Age pirate shipwreck on earth.

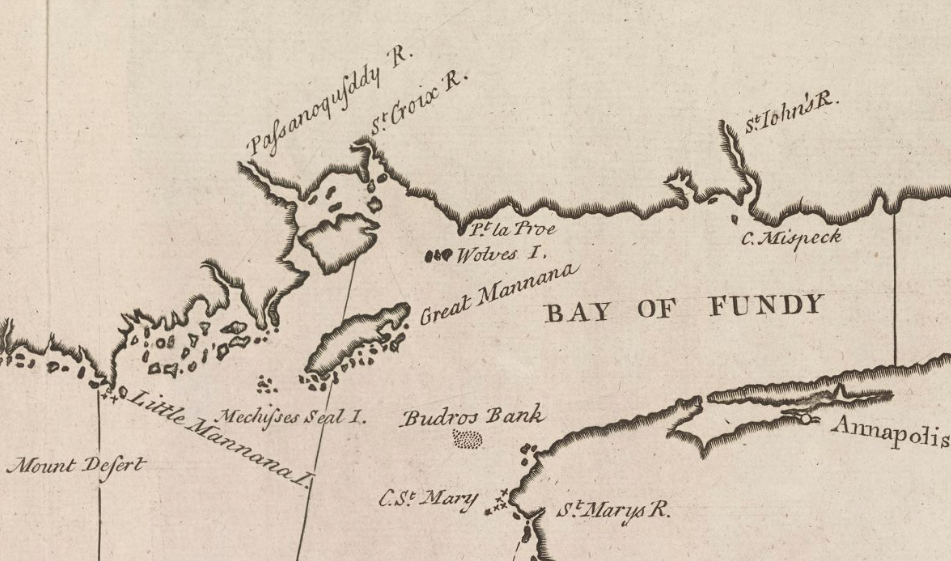
A portion of Southack's 1731 map highlighting the Bay of Fundy.

Southack was active in the British fishery at Shelburne and Canso, Nova Scotia. In his later years he apparently lived in Boston, where he died in 1745, having never been reimbursed, it is said, by the Governor for his efforts at the Whydah wreck. He is buried at Old North Church.

Among the vessels he commanded were the Porcupine (1689–1690), Mary (1690), William and Mary (1692), Friends Adventure (1693), Seaflower (1703), and the Massachusetts Province Galley, between 1697 and 1714.

== Legacy ==
- namesake of Phillips Street - Southack Street and Southack Court, Beacon Hill, Boston
