= Francis Wainwright =

- Coat of Arms of Francis Wainwrigh
- Born: August 25, 1664; Ipswich, Essex County, Massachusetts
- Died: August 3, 1711 (aged 46); Ipswich, Essex, Massachusetts
- Known for: Commanding the New England forces during the second phase of the siege of Port Royal 1707.
- Spouse(s): Sarah Whipple (1671-1709), 1686
- Children: 7

Francis Wainwright, born 1664, died 1711, a graduate from Harvard College 1686, was a merchant, office-holder, and soldier from Ipswich, Massachusetts.

== Descent ==
His father and namesake Francis Wainwright (1623–99) came to Ipswich from Chelmsford, England. As a young man he served as a soldier during the Pequot War; distinguishing himself by singlehandedly killing two enemies in close combat. Long remembered for his gallantry during that war, he became a wealthy and respected merchant.

== Public offices ==
In his youth Wainwright joined the militia, and rose through the ranks to become colonel. He was a justice of the General Sessions Court and a colonel of a provincial regiment during the expedition to Port Royal 1707. He also served as town clerk, feoffee of the grammar school, representative in the Massachusetts General Court during several years, commissioner and collector of customs and excise, and was a member of the Artillery Company.

== Port Royal 1707 ==
During the expedition to Port Royal 1707 Wainwright commanded the First or the Red regiment from Massachusetts Bay. When the besiegers failed to take the town, Colonel John March resigned from command of the expedition, and Wainwright was appointed his successor. The second attempt to take Port Royal, now under his overall command also failed. The leaders of the expedition was severely vilified by the general public in Massachusetts, and anonymous letters were sent from Boston to them in the field, claiming they were cowards that deserved hanging.

== Death ==
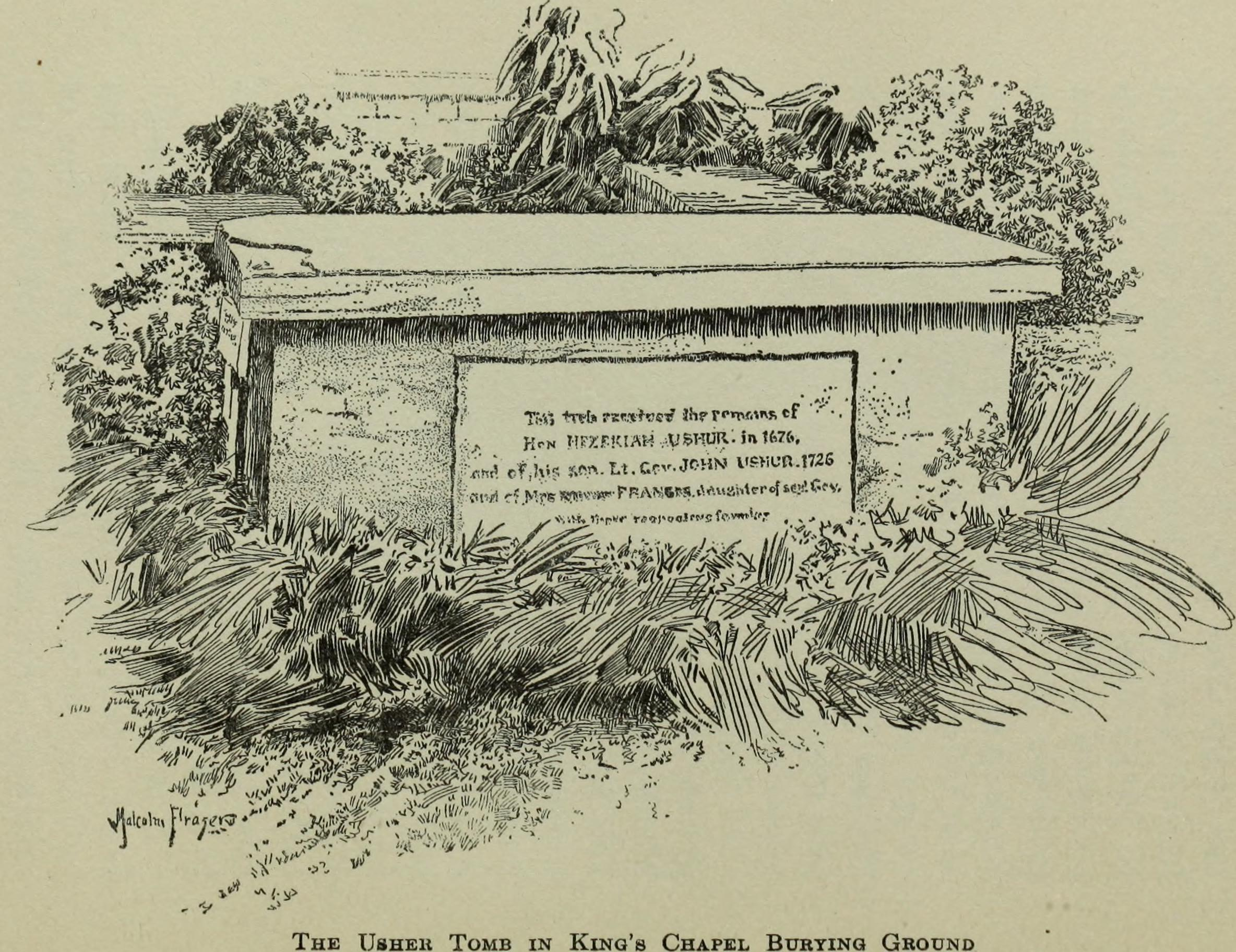
The Usher tomb in King's Chapel burial grounds (published in Days and ways in old Boston. 1915, by William Sidney Rossiter (1861-1929)

Wainwright was about to be remarried to Eliza Hirst of Salem, when he suddenly became sick and died. The wedding was set to take place on July 31, 1711; he becoming sick on the 29th, and dying on the 3rd in his house, at ten in the morning: his bride-to-be staying by his side to the end. The Colonel left a considerable amount of money to his son Francis, who also inherited through his mother, a niece of Rev.John Norton, lands in Ipswich.
