= John Barnard (clergyman) =

Coat of Arms of John Barnard

John Barnard (6 November 1681 – 24 January 1770) was a Congregationalist minister from Massachusetts.

He was born in Boston, Massachusetts. Barnard attended Harvard College where he received an MA and also read theology. In 1707 he became one of the chaplains in an expedition against Port Royal, Acadia. This foray was commanded by Colonel John March. The siege, which was unsuccessful, appeared to have been the conclusion of his military career.

In 1709, he sailed to Barbados & London, and would later return to America. Among his published writings are: "A History of the Strange Adventures of Philip Ashton" (1725); "A Version of the Psalms" (1752). He would settle in Marblehead, Massachusetts, and would preach there until his death. He died on January 24, 1770.
