= John March (colonel) =

John March (10 June 1658 – July 1712) was in a variety of businesses in Newbury, Massachusetts. He was a colonel in the Massachusetts Bay militia and, in that position, was active in a number of military operations against the French and Indians by the English in King William's War and Queen Anne's War.

During King William's War, March took part in the Battle of Port Royal (1690) and the failed expedition to Quebec.

March was injured in the Northeast Coast Campaign (1703) and then was put in charge of the Siege of Port Royal (1707). The siege was a failure, due in part to his indecisiveness in command. Though superior in numbers, the Massachusetts troops withdrew after some unsuccessful attacks. At least one member of his force, Chaplain John Barnard, urged a more vigorous offensive. Governor Daniel d'Auger de Subercase, with able assistance from Bernard-Anselme d'Abbadie de Saint-Castin, was the successful commander of the French and Indian troops.

March almost faced a court martial for his cowardice but there were so many other officers involved that it never took place. History seems to indicate that he had been put into a situation that he had neither the training nor skills to execute the orders.
