= Province Galley (ship) =

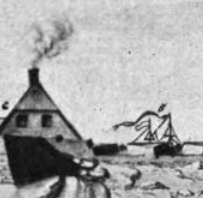
A 1705 illustration of Province Galley (background)

The Province Galley was a ketch commissioned by English colonial officials in the Province of Massachusetts Bay and launched on 1 June 1694. She was one of the first dedicated warships built by England's North American colonies and mounted ten guns. From 1696 to 1711, Province Galley was under the command of Cyprian Southack, and served in King William's War and Queen Anne's War. In 1696, she participated in the siege of Fort Nashwaak. Province Galley was replaced in 1705 by a ship of the same name that was launched on April 2 of that year; being much larger in design, she mounted twenty-four guns and had a seventy-four foot keel. Southack continued to command Province Galley, including during the unsuccessful siege of Port Royal in 1707. She ceased active service in 1717.
