= French ship Fier (1694) =

Ship of the line of the French Navy

History

France
- Name: Fier
- Builder: Rochefort Dockyard
- Laid down: 1693
- Launched: 1694
- Commissioned: 1695
- Out of service: March 1713
- Fate: Broken up 1715

General characteristics
- Tonnage: 1,750
- Length: 158 French feet as completed (Note: The French (pre-metric) foot was 6.575% longer than the equivalent English foot)
- Beam: 46 French feet as completed
- Draught: 21½ French feet
- Depth of hold: 19½ French feet
- Complement: 700, + 18 officers
- Armament: 90 (later 94) guns

Fier was a first-rate three-decker ship of the line of the French Royal Navy. On completion, she was armed with 90 guns, with twenty-six 36-pounder guns on the lower deck, twenty-eight 18-pounder guns on the middle deck, twenty-six 8-pounder guns on the upper deck, and ten 6-pounder guns on the quarterdeck. In 1706, an extra pair of 36-pounders was added to the lower deck, and an extra pair of 8-pounders was added to the upper deck, giving her 94 guns in total.

Jointly designed and built by Honoré Malet and Pierre Masson, her construction started in 1693 at Rochefort. She was launched in 1694, becoming the last three-decker to join Louis XIV's Navy. She took part in the Battle of Vélez-Málaga on 13 August 1704. In July 1707, she was sunk in shallow water at Toulon to avoid the fire from bomb vessels, but was refloated in October. She was condemned at Toulon in March 1713, and was sold to be broken up in November 1715.
