= Siege of Port Royal (1707) =

1707 engagement of Queen Anne's War

Coordinates: 44°44′30″N 65°30′55″W

- Part of Queen Anne's War
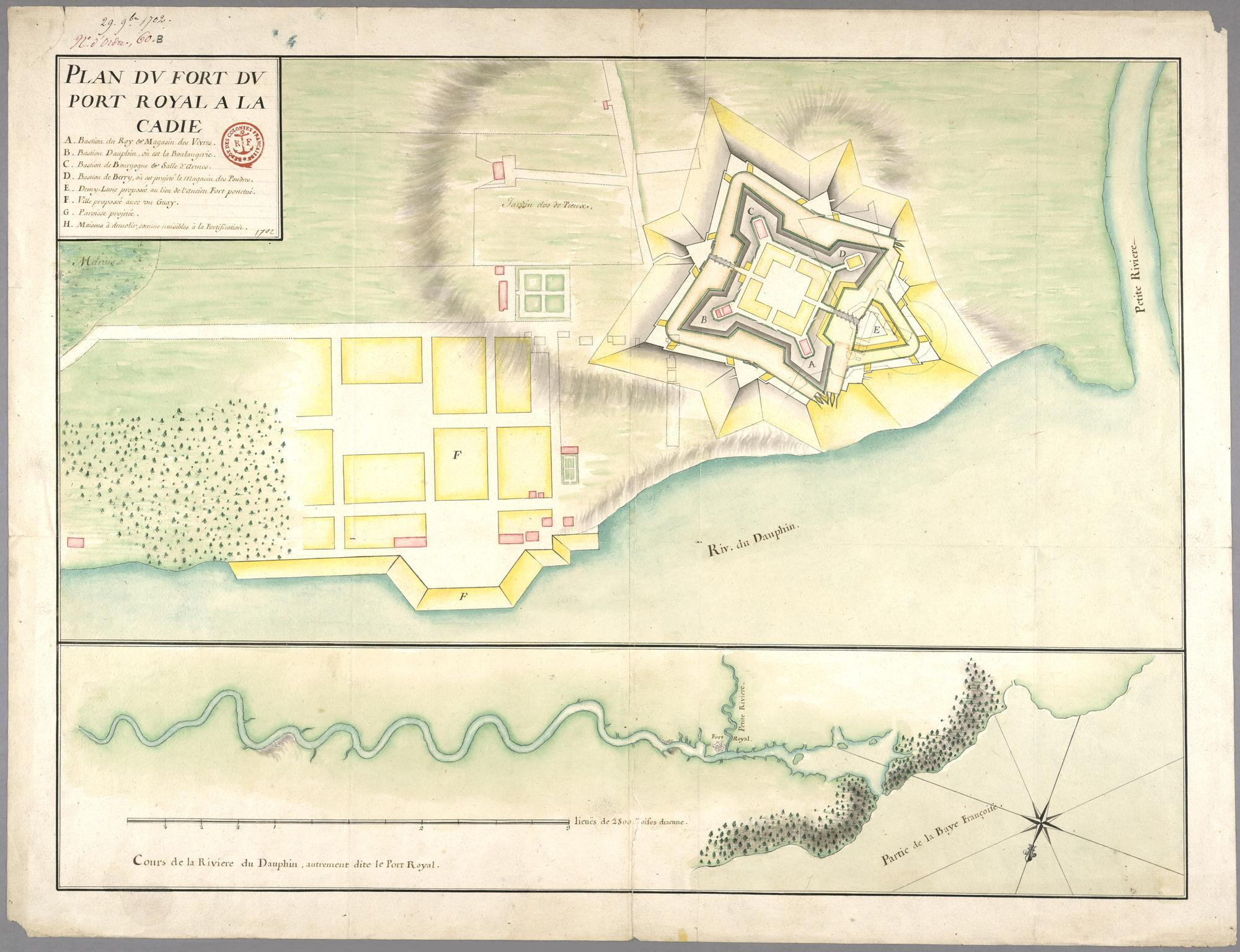
- 1702 map of Port Royal
Date	First siege: 6–17 June 1707; Second siege: 22 August – 1 September 1707
Location	Port Royal, Acadia
Result	French-Wabanaki Confederacy victory

Belligerents
France; New France; Wabanaki Confederacy	Great Britain; Massachusetts; Rhode Island; New Hampshire

Commanders and leaders
Daniel d'Auger de Subercase; Bernard-Anselme d'Abbadie de Saint-Castin; Pierre Morpain	John March; Francis Wainwright; Charles Stuckley; Winthrop Hilton; Cyprian Southack

Strength
160 regulars 60 militia 100 Indian warriors	1,150 regulars (first siege); 850 regulars (second siege)

Casualties and losses
5+ killed 20 wounded	16 killed 16 wounded

The siege of Port Royal consisted of two separate attempts in 1707 by the British New England Colonies to conquer the French colony of Acadia by capturing its capital of Port-Royal during Queen Anne's War. Both attempts were made by colonial troops and were led by officers inexperienced in siege warfare. Led by governor of Acadia Daniel d'Auger de Subercase, the French garrison at Port-Royal easily withstood both attempts, assisted by Acadian militia and the Wabanaki Confederacy outside the fort.

The first siege began on June 6, 1707, and lasted 11 days. Provincial troops led by Colonel John March were able to establish positions near Port-Royal's fort, but March's engineer claimed the necessary cannons could not be landed, and the British force withdrew amid disagreements in their war council. The second siege began August 22, and was never able to establish secure camps, owing to spirited defensive sorties organized by Subercase.

Both siege attempts were viewed as a debacle in Boston, and the expedition's leaders were jeered upon their return. Subercase, concerned that the British might return the following year, strengthened the fortifications at Port-Royal and incited attacks on New England merchant shipping. Port-Royal was captured in 1710 by a larger force that included British Army troops, which marked the end of French rule in Acadia.

== Background ==
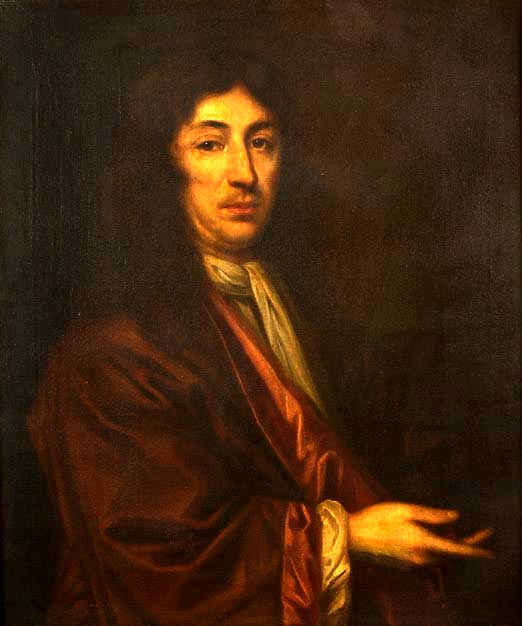
Governor of Massachusetts Joseph Dudley, who organized the expedition against Port-Royal.

Port-Royal was the capital of the French colony of Acadia almost since France first began settling the area in 1604. It consequently became a focal point for conflict between English and French colonists in the next century. It was destroyed in 1613 by English raiders led by Samuel Argall, but eventually rebuilt. In 1690 it was captured by forces from the Province of Massachusetts Bay, although it was restored to France by the Treaty of Ryswick.

=== French preparations ===
With the outbreak of the War of the Spanish Succession in 1702, English and French colonists once again prepared for conflict. Acadia's governor, Jacques-François de Monbeton de Brouillan, had, in anticipation of war, already begun construction of a stone and earth fort in 1701, which was largely completed by 1704. Following a French raid on Deerfield on the Massachusetts frontier in February 1704, English colonists in Boston organized a raid against Acadia the following May. Led by Benjamin Church, they raided Grand Pré and other Acadian communities. English and French accounts differ on whether Church's expedition mounted an attack on Port-Royal. Church's account indicates that they anchored in the harbour and considered making an attack, but ultimately decided against the idea; French accounts claim that a minor attack was made.

When Daniel d'Auger de Subercase became governor of Acadia in 1706, he went on the offensive, encouraging Indian raids against the English New England Colonies. He also encouraged privateering from Port-Royal against English colonial shipping. The privateers were highly effective; the English fishing fleet on the Grand Banks was reduced by 80 percent between 1702 and 1707, and some New England coastal communities were raided.

=== New England preparations ===
English merchants in Boston had long traded with Port-Royal, and some of this activity had continued even after the war began. Some of these merchants, notably Samuel Vetch, were closely associated with governor of Massachusetts Joseph Dudley, and by 1706 outrage began growing in the colonial assembly over the matter. Vetch chose to deal with these allegations by going to London to press a case for a military expedition against New France, while Dudley, who had previously requested such support without response, chose to demonstrate his anti-French sentiment by organizing an expedition against Port-Royal using mostly colonial resources. In March 1707 he revived an idea he had first developed in 1702 that called for New England troops to launch an expedition supported by Royal Navy elements that were locally available. His proposal was approved by the assembly on 21 March. Colonial popular opinion was divided on the need for the expedition: some ministers argued in its favour from the pulpit, while Cotton Mather "Pray'd God not to carry his people hence."

Massachusetts raised nearly 1,000 men; New Hampshire provided 60 men, Rhode Island sent 80, and a company of Indians from Cape Cod was also recruited. These men were formed into two provincial infantry regiments; the First Regiment consisted of twelve companies in red coats led by Colonel Francis Wainwright, while the Second Regiment consisted of eleven companies in blue coats under the command of Colonel Winthrop Hilton. Recruiting was difficult in Massachusetts due to the lack of enthusiasm for the endeavour, and authorities were forced to draft men to fill the ranks.

The authorities in Connecticut was also asked to contribute to the expedition, but declined, citing bad feeling over the return of Port-Royal by treaty after its capture in 1690. The force, which was placed under the command of Colonel John March, totalled 1,150 soldiers and 450 sailors, and was carried by a fleet of 24 ships, including the 50-gun Royal Navy warship Deptford under the command of Captain Charles Stuckley, and the 24-gun New England ketch Province Galley led by Cyprian Southack. (March took a former prisoner of the Maliseet, John Gyles, as his translator.)

== First siege ==
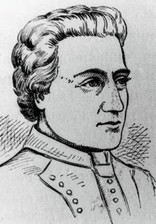
Daniel d'Auger de Subercase led the defense of Port-Royal.

The British fleet arrived outside the channel of the Port-Royal harbour on June 6, and troops were landed the next day. Governor Subercase's defence force at the time consisted of 100 Troupes de la Marine that had fortuitously been reinforced by the recent arrival of another 60 who were due to take command of a recently built frigate. Just hours before the British arrival, he had also welcomed about 100 Abenaki Indians led by the young Bernard-Anselme d'Abbadie de Saint-Castin. As soon as the British ships were spotted, Subercase also called out the local militia, mustering about 60 men.

March landed with about 700 men to the north of the fort, and another 300 to its south under the command of Colonel Samuel Appleton, with the goal of establishing a siege line around the fort. Both forces were landed too far from the fort and spent the rest of the day marching toward it. Subercase sent a small force to the south on the morning of the 8th, who were driven back toward the fort by Appleton. Subercase himself led a larger contingent to the north, where he established an ambush at a river March's force would have to cross. After a sharp battle in which Subercase's horse was shot out from under him, the defenders were pushed back into the fort.

The New Englanders established camps about 1.5 miles (2.4 km) from the fort. Subercase sent parties out of the fort to harass their foraging parties, giving rise to rumors that additional militia forces were en route from northern Acadia. The invaders managed to advance their lines closer to the fort, but their chief engineer, Colonel John Redknap, did not believe the expedition's heavy cannons could be landed safely, because they "must pass within command of the fort". This led to disagreements between March, Redknap, and Stuckley which spelled the end of the expedition. After a final assault on June 16, which French accounts describe as a failed attempt to take the fort, and British accounts say was merely an attempt to destroy some buildings outside the fort, the expedition embarked on its ships and sailed off on the 17th. March directed the fleet to sail for Casco Bay (near present-day Portland, Maine).

== Interlude ==
From Casco Bay, March sent a letter to Boston, in which he laid the blame for the expedition's failure on Stuckley and Redknap. News of the failure preceded his messengers, and they were met upon their arrival by a jeering crowd of women and children. Redknap, one of the messengers, was able to convince Dudley that he had acted within his orders, and blame was generally attached to March for the failure. Dudley issued orders to March that the fleet should stay put, with all men remaining aboard under penalty of death, while his council considered the next step. Dudley eventually sent reinforcements and a three-man commission (including two colonels and John Leverett, a lawyer with no military experience) to oversee affairs, and ordered the expedition to make a second attack.

Despite the orders, desertion from the British fleet was high, and the force was reduced to about 850 when it sailed for Port-Royal in late August. March resigned the expedition command and was replaced by Wainwright. Subercase was forewarned of the second attempt, and had erected additional defenses to impede the attackers' approaches. He was also reinforced by the fortuitous arrival of the Intrepide, a French frigate under the command of Pierre Morpain. His crew was added to the defences, and captured prize ships he brought with him provided needed provisions for the fort.

== Second siege ==
The British fleet arrived near Port-Royal on August 21, and Wainwright landed his troops about 2 miles (3.2 km) below (south of) the fort the next day and marched them to a position about 1 mile (1.6 km) north of the fort. This area, where March had previously camped, was one of the areas near which Subercase had thrown up additional defensive earthworks. On August 23 Wainwright sent a detachment of 300 to clear a path for the heavy cannon; this attempt was repulsed by forces sent out by Subercase to harass them. Using guerrilla-style tactics and fire from the fort's cannons, they forced the New Englanders to retreat to their camp.

This defeat apparently had a significant effect on the invaders' morale; Wainwright wrote that his camp was "surrounded with enemies and judging it unsafe to proceed on any service without a company of at least one hundred men." In what was probably the most serious clash, a foraging party cutting brush was ambushed by a French and Indian force, and nine of its members were killed. The situation got so bad in the British camp that on the 27th they withdrew to another camp protected by their ships' guns. The camp was not properly fortified, and soldiers there were constantly subjected to sniping and other attacks from French forces and their Indian allies.

When Wainwright made a second landing at another point on August 31, Subercase himself led 120 soldiers out of the fort. About 70 men engaged the New Englanders in hand-to-hand combat, which was fought with axes and musket butts. Saint-Castin and almost 20 of his men were wounded while five others were killed. The next day, September 1, the British reembarked on their ships, and sailed back to Boston. The French in their reports claimed to have killed as many as 200 men, but British sources claim only about 16 killed and 16 wounded in the siege.

== Aftermath ==
The expedition's return to Boston was also met with jeers. Dudley's commissioners were sarcastically called "the three Port Royal worthies" and "the three champions". Dudley's reports of the affair minimized its failings, pointing out that many plantations around Port-Royal had been destroyed during the two sieges. Dudley also refused to make inquiries into the expedition's failure, fearing the blame would be placed on him. Subercase, concerned that the British might return the following year, worked to strengthen the fortifications at Port-Royal. He also built a small warship to assist in the colony's defenses, and convinced Morpain to raid New England shipping. The privateer was so successful that by the end of 1708 Port-Royal was overcrowded with prisoners from the captured prizes.

None of this helped save Port-Royal from the next attack, since France failed to send any significant support, while the British mobilized larger and better-organized forces. Vetch, with support from Dudley, Boston merchants, and the New England fishing community, successfully lobbied Queen Anne for military support for an expedition to conquer all of New France in 1709. This prompted the colonists to mobilize in the expectation that troops would arrive from England; their efforts were aborted when the promised military support failed to materialize. Vetch and Francis Nicholson returned to England in its aftermath, and again secured promises of military support for an attempt on Port-Royal in 1710. In the summer of 1710, a fleet arrived in Boston carrying 400 marines. Augmented by colonial regiments, this force captured Port-Royal after a third siege in 1710.

== See also ==
- Military history of Nova Scotia
