= Timeline of Port-Royal - Annapolis Royal history =

This is a timeline of the history of Port Royal, Acadia – later Annapolis Royal, Nova Scotia

== Pre-17th century ==
- 1497 – John Cabot, under English flag, explores waters off present-day Nova Scotia
- 1541 – Jacques Cartier attempts a French colony near Quebec City (Charlesbourg-Royal), which fails
- 1598 – Marquis de La Roche attempts a French colony on Sable Island, Nova Scotia
- 1600 – Pierre Chauvin, a French naval and military captain, attempts a colony at Tadoussac

== 17th century ==
- 1604 – Pierre Dugua de Mons arrives in Annapolis Basin and grants Seigneury of Port Royal to Jean de Poutrincourt
- 1605 – L'Habitation (Port Royal) built by de Mons, with Samuel de Champlain and Poutrincourt
- 1606 – Poutrincourt, with Louis Hebert, plants first wheat fields in North America
- 1606 – Poutrincourt builds first grist mill in North America
- 1607 – Settlement temporarily abandoned when de Mons’ monopoly is revoked
- 1610 – Jean de Poutrincourt returns as governor, expanding settlement
- 1613 – English attack led by Samuel Argall destroys L'Habitation
- 1623 – Charles De La Tour moves from Port Royal to Cap de Sable
- 1629 – Scots under Sir William Alexander establish Charles Fort at Port Royal
- 1632 – Treaty of Saint-Germain-en-Laye (1632) causes ejection of Scots
- 1634 – Charles de Menou d’Aulnay moves from Cap de Sable to Port Royal
- 1640 – Charles De La Tour attacks Port Royal during the Acadian Civil War
- 1643 – Fort rebuilt by d'Aulnay
- 1643 – Charles De La Tour attempts to capture Port Royal again
- 1650 – D’Aulnay's death causes succession crisis, Jeanne Motin assumes rights
- 1653 – Governor Charles De La Tour and Seigeuresse Jeanne Motin wed
- 1654 – English forces under Major Robert Sedgwick capture Port Royal
- 1667 – Treaty of Breda restores Acadia to France, but delayed until 1670
- 1671 – First Port Royal census (392 inhabitants)
- 1673 – Inhabitants meet to build Eglise Saint Jean Baptiste
- 1686 – Visit of Intendant Jacques de Meulles and Bishop Saint-Vallier
- 1689 – Construction begins on new fort, which is not finished
- 1690 – Sir William Phips of Massachusetts captures Port Royal for the English
- 1690 – English return and destroy the town
- 1697 – Treaty of Ryswick restores French sovereignty over Acadia

== 18th century ==
- 1702 – Construction of the new Fort Anne fortifications begins
- 1707 – Port Royal besieged twice, town largely destroyed
- 1710 – British capture Port Royal; renamed Annapolis Royal, capital of Nova Scotia
- 1711 – French and native allies attempt to retake Port Royal
- 1712 – Peace of Utrecht formalizes British dominion of peninsular Nova Scotia
- 1724 – During Father Rale's War, Mi'kmaq and Maliseets kill a soldier and raid the town
- 1744 – During King George's War, French and native allies make two attempts to re-capture
- 1745 – Town and fort besieged again
- 1746 – Final attempt by French to retake the fort and town
- 1755 – Acadians at Port Royal deported
- 1760 – Arrival of New England Planters reshapes agriculture and landholdings
- 1781 – American privateer raid, last time Annapolis Royal is attacked
- 1783 – Mass arrival of Loyalists from New York

== 19th century ==
- 1812 – Town is used as privateer base during War of 1812
- 1854 – British Garrison leaves Fort Anne for Halifax
- 1869 – Arrival of railway to Annapolis Royal
- 1871 – Commercial tourism begins in Nova Scotia at Annapolis Royal
- 1880 – Much of commercial district destroyed by fire
- 1889 – Annapolis Royal lighthouse built
- 1893 – Incorporation of Town

== 20th century ==
- 1917 – Fort Anne designated a National Historic Site
- 1921 – Commercial district destroyed by fire, again
- 1941 – Port Royal Habitation opens
- 1984 – Tidal power station opens
- 1994 – Creation of National Historic District

== 21st century ==
- 2019 – Tidal power station closes

== See also ==
- List of years in Canada
