= Seigneur =

French title of nobility

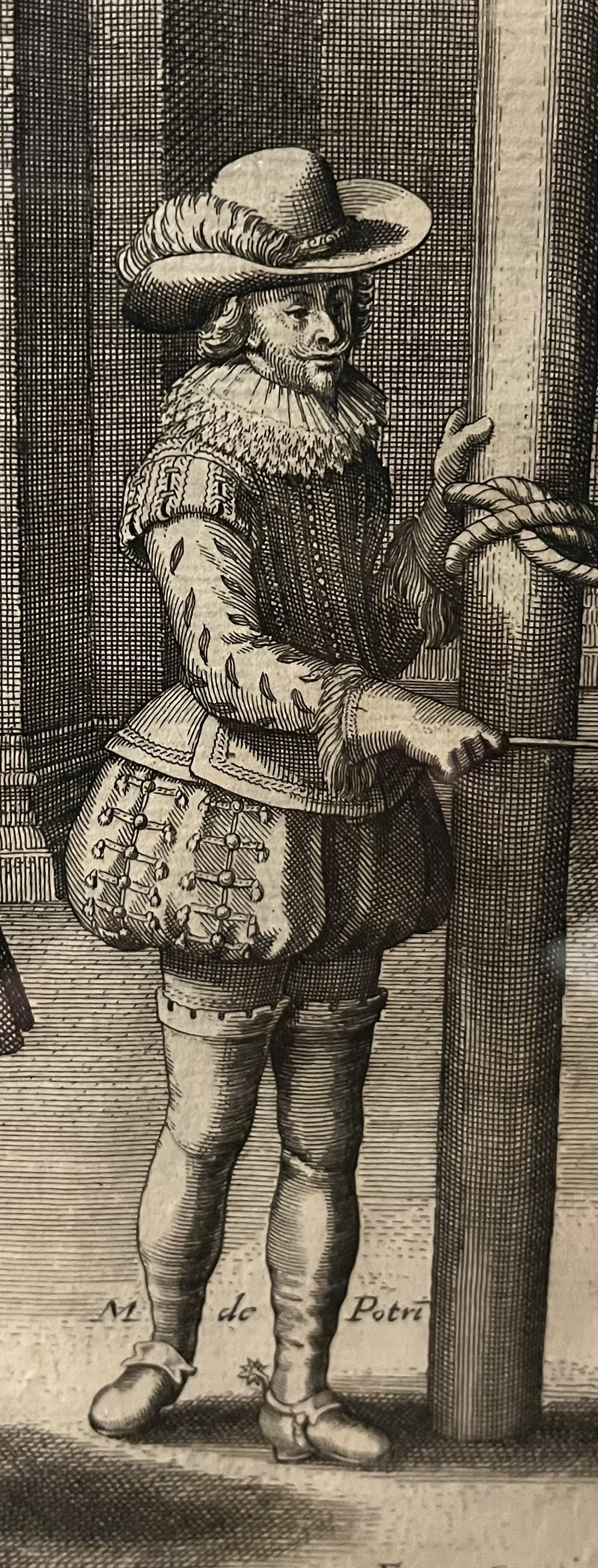
Jean de Poutrincourt of Port Royal, first seigneur in North America

A seigneur (French pronunciation: [sɛɲœʁ]) or lord is an originally feudal title in France before the Revolution, in New France and British North America until 1854, and in the Channel Islands to this day. The seigneur owned a seigneurie, seigneury, or lordship—a form of title or land tenure—as a fief, with its associated obligations and rights over person and property. In this sense, a seigneur could be an individual—male or female, high or low-born—or a collective entity, typically a religious community such as a monastery, seminary, college, or parish. Seigneurialism was repealed in Acadia in 1733, France in 1789 and the Province of Canada in 1854. Since then, the feudal title has only been applicable in the Channel Islands and for sovereign princes by their families. A seigneur could collect money from a tenant that grows crops on their seigneurie. The tenant is required to use the seigneur's gristmill to grind grains and pay a fee. Seigneurs could also take a share of the fish caught in the rivers or lakes next to their land. Seigneurs could also give privileges to use water, build businesses, and solve small arguments between neighbours.

== Terms ==
The English seigneur is borrowed from the French seigneur, which descends from Middle French seigneur, from Old French seignor (oblique form of sire), from Latin seniōrem, the accusative singular of senior ("elder"), the comparative form of senex ("old, elderly"). It is a doublet of the English words senior, sir, sire, seignior, sieur, and monsieur and shares the same provenance as the Italian signore, Portuguese senhor, and Spanish señor, which—like mister—referred to feudal lords before becoming general words of respectful address towards men.

The noble title and land title of a seigneur is a seigneurie or lordship, the rights that the seigneur was entitled to is called seigneuriage, and the jurisdiction exercised over the fief was seigneur justicier. The bearers of these titles, rights, and jurisdiction were generally but not exclusively male. A female seigneur was generally known as a seigneuresse or lady. The seigneur could be a noble or a roturier (commoner) as well as a corporation such as religious order, a monastery, a parish.

In English, seigneur is used in historical scholarship to discuss the French seigneurial system. It is also frequently calqued as "lord", the analogous term in the English feudal system.

The term grand seigneur has survived in English and French. Today this usually means an elegant, urbane gentleman. Some even use it in a stricter sense to refer to a man whose manners and way of life reflect his noble ancestry and great wealth. In addition, Le Grand Seigneur had long been the name given by the French to the Ottoman sultan. Notre Seigneur Jésus-Christ is the French equivalent of the English Our Lord Jesus Christ.

The English word seignorage is also derived from seigneur.

=== Current use in the Channel Islands ===
The title is still used in the Channel Islands, self-governing territories that swear fealty to the British Crown as the successor to the Duke of Normandy. In these jurisdictions, a Seigneur is not merely a titular noble but the holder of a vested territorial office rooted in Norman customary law. While the feudal system was abolished in most of Europe, it remains a functional part of the islands' constitutional and legal identity, precisely because it underpins the distinct relationship between the Crown and its Channel Island dependencies.

==== Guernsey ====
In the Bailiwick of Guernsey, these noble fiefs and their Seigneurs represent a direct continuation of the ancient Duchy of Normandy, predating the establishment of British baronies. Recognized as a unique form of tenure in capite, they remain extant under modern law, whereas comparable noble tenures were abolished in France and Germany. Historically, Seigneurs considered themselves part of la Noblesse: as N.V.L. Rybot observed, in the Channel Islands "Nobility was considered to begin with the Ecuyer and not as in England with the Baron." The preservation of this tradition in Guernsey reflects a deliberate constitutional choice: the Seigneurs and their fiefs are recognized not merely as survivals of a medieval system, but as the living institutional expression of the Bailiwick's Norman identity and of its autonomous status under the Crown.

The modern legal status of this office is upheld by two statutes. The Feudal Dues (Guernsey) Law, 1980 preserves, under Section 4, the right of fief-holders to bear the legal style of Seigneur or Dame. The Court of Chief Pleas (Guernsey) Law, 2004 codifies the statutory obligation of certain Seigneurs — including those of the Fiefs of Anneville, Blanchelande and Mauxmarquis — to perform Suit of Court (Secta Curiae), reflecting the principle of the Grand Coutumier de Normandie that the Sovereign's court is not fully constituted without the attendance of the chief tenants, who form a vital part of the island's constitutional framework.

Seigneurs thus perform a public constitutional function, serving as the living link between the Sovereign — in the capacity of Duke of Normandy — and the island's autonomous land system. Their attendance at the Court of Chief Pleas is a prerequisite for the formal opening of the judicial year, anchoring the island's legal processes in its distinct Norman constitutional identity. It is this dual role — as legal officers and as custodians of the Bailiwick's identity heritage — that explains the deliberate retention of the seigneurial system within Guernsey's modern constitutional framework.

Several private fiefs are registered directly with the Crown and maintained in the official State Cadastre. Some Seigneurs hold more than one fief within their primary territory, each defined by official tenure under the Sovereign.

==== Jersey and Sark ====
In the Bailiwick of Jersey, the Seigneur of Saint Ouen and the Seigneur of Samarès are among the titles that survive, with their holders attending the Assize d'Héritage. In Sark, the Seigneur holds the island as a Royal fief directly from the Crown, a constitutional arrangement reformed but not abolished by the Reform (Sark) Law, 2008.

== See also ==
- Lordship of Lac-des-Deux-Montagnes
- Lordship of Port Royal
- Seigneurial system of New France
