= Church of Saint John the Baptist (Port-Royal) =

- Église Saint-Jean-Baptiste de Port-Royal
- Location: Port-Royal
- Country: New France (Acadia)
- Denomination: Roman Catholic Church

History
- Status: Parish church
- Founded: c. 1670s
- Dedication: Saint John the Baptist

Architecture
- Functional status: Destroyed
- Years built: 1670s

Administration
- Diocese: Diocese of Quebec
- Parish: Saint John the Baptist of Port Royal

The Church of Saint John the Baptist was a historic Roman Catholic church located in Port Royal, Acadia, part of New France (present-day Annapolis Royal, Nova Scotia). Although its exact construction date is unknown, it is generally believed to have been built between 1673 and 1678, replacing an earlier church in the settlement. The church was destroyed in 1690 during military conflict. The site where it once stood later became known as the Garrison Cemetery, which served successively as the British Garrison Cemetery and, subsequently, as the Parish Cemetery for Saint Luke's Anglican Church.

Before 1710, Acadian parishes included not only Saint John the Baptist in Port-Royal, but also Saint-Charles-des-Mines in Grand Pré, Sainte-Famille in Pisiguit, and Saint-Joseph at Rivière-aux-Canards, though only some parish registers survive. By 1750, additional parishes emerged, such as Notre-Dame de l’Assomption in Pisiguit and Saint-Pierre et Saint-Paul in Cobeguit. This doesn't include known missionary churches.

== Pre-establishment history ==
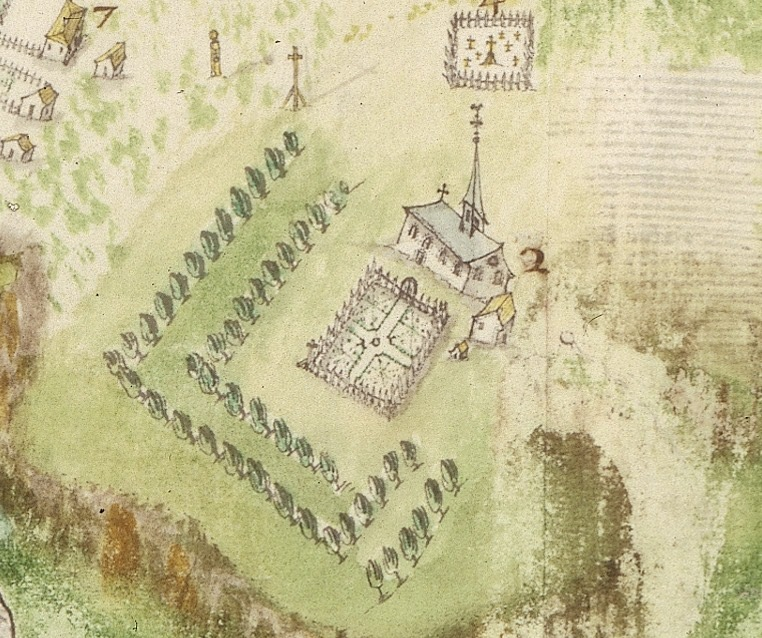
A representation of the Church of Saint John the Baptist in Port Royal created around 1686.

The first mass in the New France settlement of Port Royal occurred in 1605 by Father Nicholas Aubry, who accompanied Pierre Dugua, Sieur de Mons, on his original expedition. The first baptism in New France was that of Chief Membertou in Port Royal on the Feast of Saint John the Baptist, June 24, 1610. The baptism was done by Father Jesse Fleché, a secular priest brought from France by Seigneur Jean de Poutrincourt.

In 1611, the first Jesuits arrived in Port Royal, Father Pierre Biard (1567–1622) and Father Énemond Massé (1575–1646), who were sent by the authorities in France to spread Christianity.

In 1649, Father Léonard de Chartres, a Capuchin monk, consecrated a newly built church in Port-Royal and by 1653 he officiated the Jeanne Motin-Charles de la Tour marriage. Father Léonard remained in the town after the 1654 English conquest but died shortly thereafter.

The earliest surviving church record from Port Royal is the baptism of Marie de Menou, daughter of Governor Charles de Menou d'Aulnay and Jeanne Motin de Reux, on September 21, 1639. This event followed the relocation of settlers from La Hève to Port Royal under d'Aulnay's leadership. While the exact location of the baptism is undocumented, historian André-Carl Vachon suggests it likely occurred in a church within the settlement. The Capuchins were active in Acadia during the 1640s, with the main monastery at Port Royal. They were expelled when the settlement fell to the English in 1654.

== Parish establishment ==
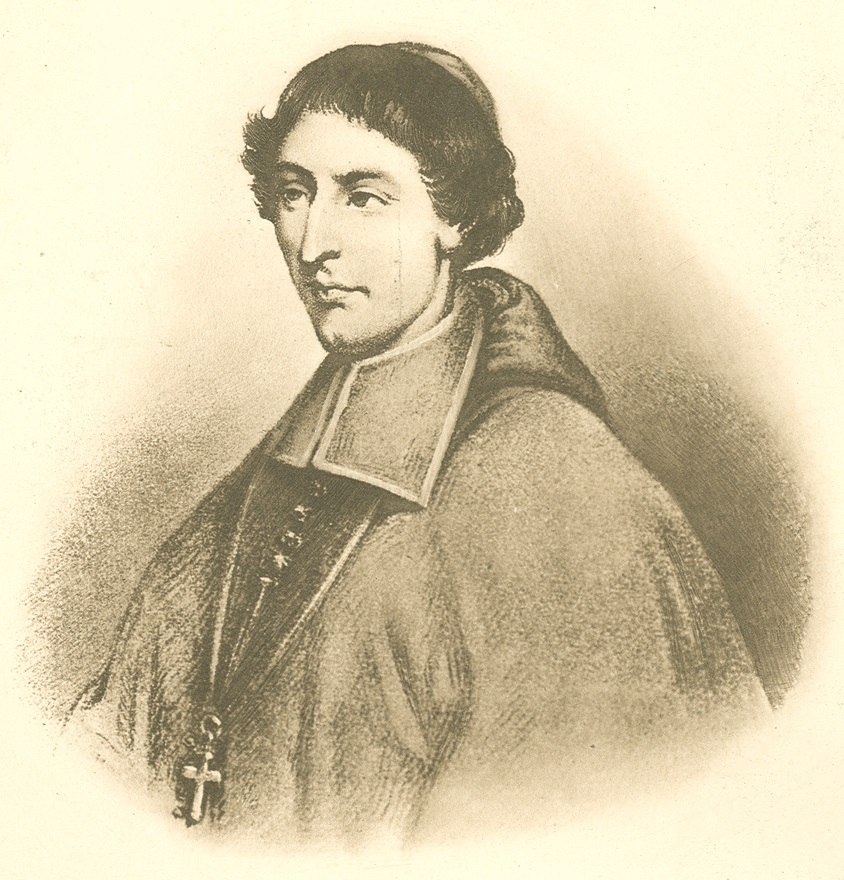
Bishop La Croix of Quebec visited the church in 1686.

Soon after Port Royal was returned to the French after 14 years of English rule from 1654 to 1670, parishioners gathered on June 18, 1673 to plan the financing of a church. The Parish of Saint John the Baptist was officially established on October 30, 1678, by François de Laval, Bishop of Quebec. The Diocese of Quebec had only been created a few years before in 1674, and Laval was its first Bishop.

The first recorded parish priest, Father Moulins, a Franciscan friar, was appointed around 1664 according to one account, though another suggests Port Royal lacked a priest during English rule (1654–1670), implying his arrival around 1670. He was succeeded by Father Louis Petit (1629–1709) in 1676. In the 1680s, Father Claude Trouvé (1644–1704) joined as an assistant to Petit. In a letter dated October 2, 1685, Trouvé described Port Royal as a community of "at least 600 souls," noting that despite being spread over five leagues along the river, residents attended church in large numbers on Sundays and holidays.

In the summer of 1686, Bishop Jean-Baptiste de La Croix visited Port Royal as part of a broader tour of the settlement, accompanying Jacques de Meulles, Intendant of New France. During the visit, La Croix participated in sacraments for the Feast of Saint Anne on July 26 and praised the congregation's sincere piety.

== Church destruction in 1690 ==
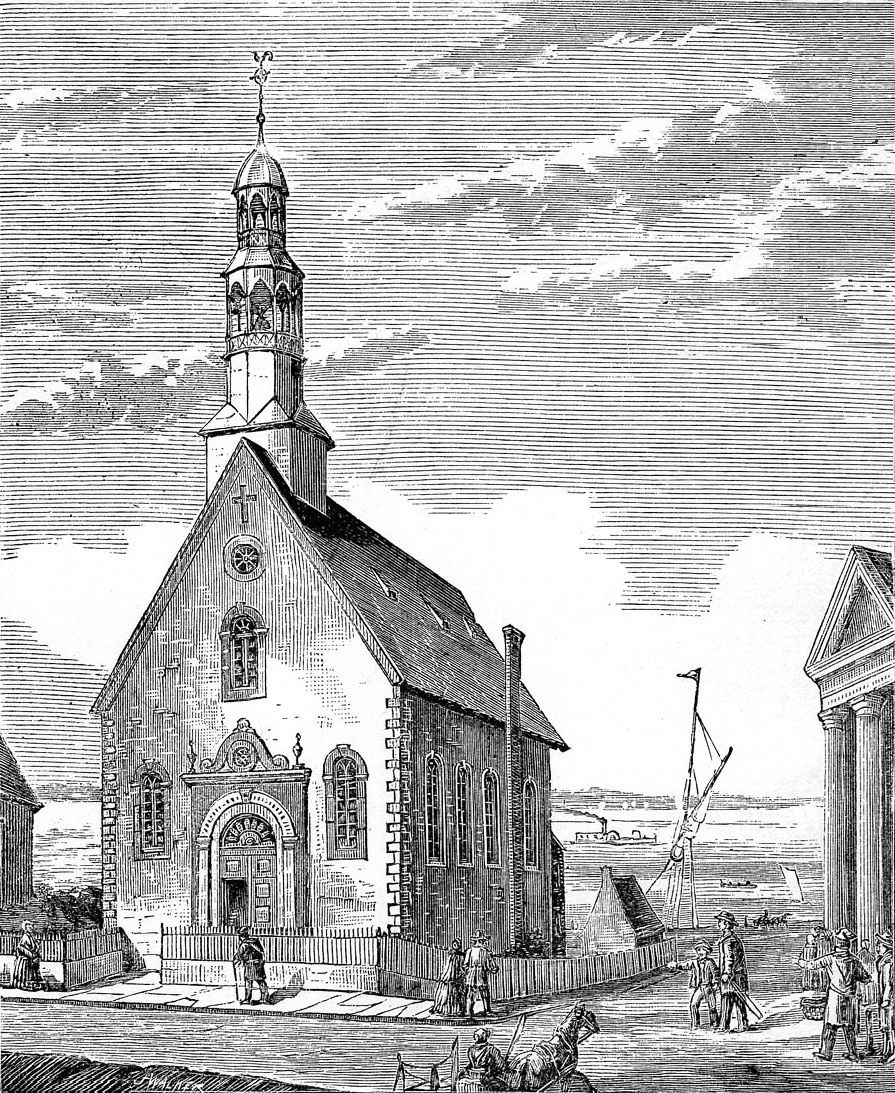
The original Chapel of Notre-Dame-de-Bon-Secours in Montreal, founded in 1675, dates to the same period as the Church of Saint John the Baptist in Port Royal, Acadia. Though no images of the 1675 chapel exist, the replacement chapel in the image above, was built after a 1754 fire, supposedly to the original 1675 design and offers a glimpse of the era's ecclesiastical architecture.

In May 1690, the settlement came under the threat of attack by forces led by William Phips from Boston. Father Petit assisted in the negotiations for the surrender of Port Royal to the New Englanders under favourable terms for the French garrison. However, upon the arrival of Phips in the town, the terms were reneged and the French garrison of 58 soldiers was imprisoned in the church. The church was later looted by the New Englanders. They took the tabernacle, the sacred vessels and everything else, including the clerical gowns. After looting the church, Phips imprisoned the residents of Port Royal within it and administered an Oath of Allegiance to King William and Queen Mary.

Father Petit, Father Trouvé, Governor Meneval, and the 58 French soldiers were taken to Boston as prisoners. In October of 1690, Petit was taken with Phips in a failed expedition against Quebec but was exchanged for English prisoners before leaving in the fall.

Later in the summer of 1690, two ships set sail from Boston to ensure that the inhabitants of Port Royal were maintaining their loyalty to England. They learned this was not the case and returned to loot and burn the town, including the church.

== Post-destruction Catholic worship ==
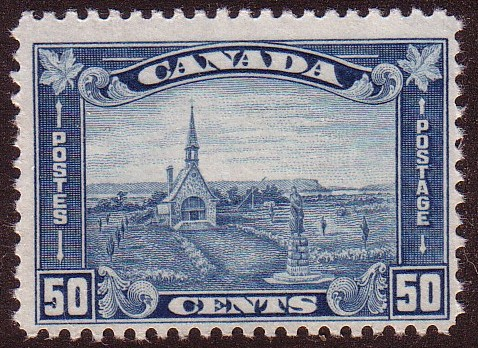
The Acadian Memorial Church in Grand Pré, Nova Scotia shares many design characteristics of the 1686 image of Saint John the Baptist.

By 1693, there was a new parish priest, Abel Madoux. He was noted in 1701 as being upset by the fact that the stones from the ruined church were being used for the new fort being constructed by Governor Brouillan.

The congregation had no means to build another church and gathered in a dwelling house until they obtained a building sold by a Claude-Sébastien De Villieu for 4,000 écus and converted it into a church. In 1699, a visitor named Diereville noted that the makeshift church resembled a barn more than a church.

In 1701, a nun noted that the impromptu church had a straw-covered roof, log walls, and paper windows. There was no bell and the people were called to mass with the beating of a drum.

At Port Royal, children were often baptised at birth by laypeople and later formalised by a priest, as seen in Charles Amiraut’s baptism by the seigneur, Monsieur de Pobomcoup, and solemnized five years later by Father Felix Pain.

In 1704, Father Justinien Durand became the parish priest. He lived at the monastery, adjacent to the former church, that also functioned as a rectory. The monastery was destroyed during an attack on the town in 1708.

The French government provided compensation to rebuild the monastery, but a two-year dispute arose over whether to rebuild the monastery or the church. The dispute ended with the capture of the town by the British in 1710. After the occupation, local parishioners were allowed to participate in mass at the nearby Mohawk fort, as the British had permitted a parish priest to reside there.

A new church was built on the other side of the river in Granville Ferry at an undetermined location that served the local population until the expulsions started in 1755. It was initially overseen by Father Justinien Durand who went to Isle Royale in 1720 to seek advice regarding the oath of loyalty being required of the Acadian population, but he never returned. Jean-Baptiste de Gay Desenclaves served as one of the final parish priests before the Acadian Expulsion of 1755. In contrast to his predecessors since the British took control of the town in 1710, he earned the respect of British authorities for his genuine efforts to foster peace.

The first priests to visit the town after the expulsion were Father Bailey and Father Jones, the Vicar General from Halifax, in about 1780. At that time were 68 Catholics, of whom 67 were of Acadian descent. The first recorded return of a French priest was that of Father Jean-Mandé Sigongne who was based at Church Point, but often visited Annapolis Royal. The first recorded visit of a Catholic bishop to the town since that of La Croix in 1686 was Bishop Joseph-Octave Plessis, who visited in July 1815.

List of Capuchin and Parish Priests
Priest	From
Father Pascal de Troyes	?
Father Léonard de Chartres	1649
Father Laurent Moulins	1664 or 1670
Father Louis Petit	1676
Father Abel Madoux	1693
Father Félix Pain	1702
Father Justinien Durand	1704
Father Charlemagne Cuvier	1720
Father René-Charles de Breslay	1724
Father Claude de La Vernède de Saint-Poncy	1729
Father Jean-Baptiste de Gay Desenclaves	1742

A Catholic church would not return to the town until May 1832 when land, which now consists of Saint Louis Cemetery, was purchased to build a chapel. There were no Acadians that were part of the committee to finance the building of the chapel, but rather Irish families. A larger church, named Saint Thomas', was built in 1910 on Upper Saint George Street. When the old chapel was demolished in 1931, Saint Thomas' was renamed as Saint Louis. It serves today as the town of Annapolis Royal's Catholic Church.

== The church in Port Royal life ==
The Catholic Church profoundly shaped Port Royal society, with priests providing spiritual guidance and mediating community disputes. Its influence was reflected in low premarital conception rates and the absence of marriages during Lent and Advent. Heads of household participated in assemblies to address parish concerns and appoint a syndic to represent interests to the seigneur and state. A vestry (fabrique) managed church property and the sacristy, with an elected churchwarden (marguillier) overseeing accounts, a practice documented since d’Aulnay’s era in the 1630s.

The church reinforced social hierarchies, supporting deference to seigneurs. Mathieu Goutin reported an incident from around 1690 where a man, Allein, disrespected Seigneuresse Marie de La Tour by walking ahead of her after mass. Her son, the young Sieur de Belleisle, defended her honour but was slapped by Allein, prompting intervention by Father Petit who had Allein removed from the church. The Seigneur also ensured tithe collection, and were often named as godparents for baptisms, underscoring their role in parish life.

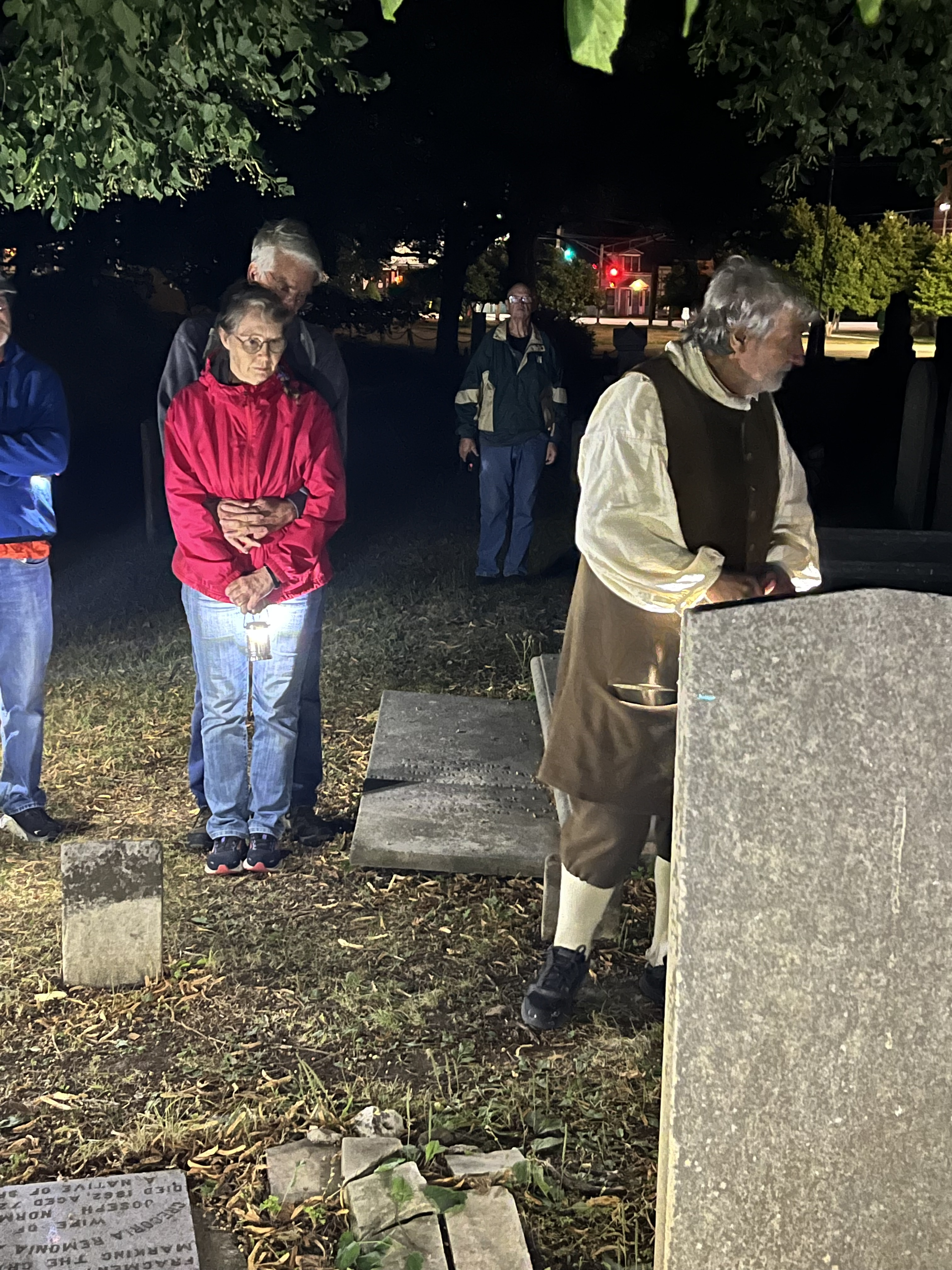
The cemetery in the former church's grounds is a draw for visitors to Annapolis Royal.

== Legacy ==
Although the first known church on the site of Saint John the Baptist dates from the 1670s, the history of the land which is known today as the Garrison Cemetery is not fully understood. Ground penetrating radar has been used in recent years to understand the full extent and nature of the cemetery. The cemetery and former church site are a focal point of visitors to the town, particularly those of Acadian heritage wishing to see the location of the first Acadian Church and oldest known Acadian cemetery.
