= Garrison Cemetery (Annapolis Royal, Nova Scotia) =

Cemetery in Canada

Garrison Cemetery Le cimetière de la garnison
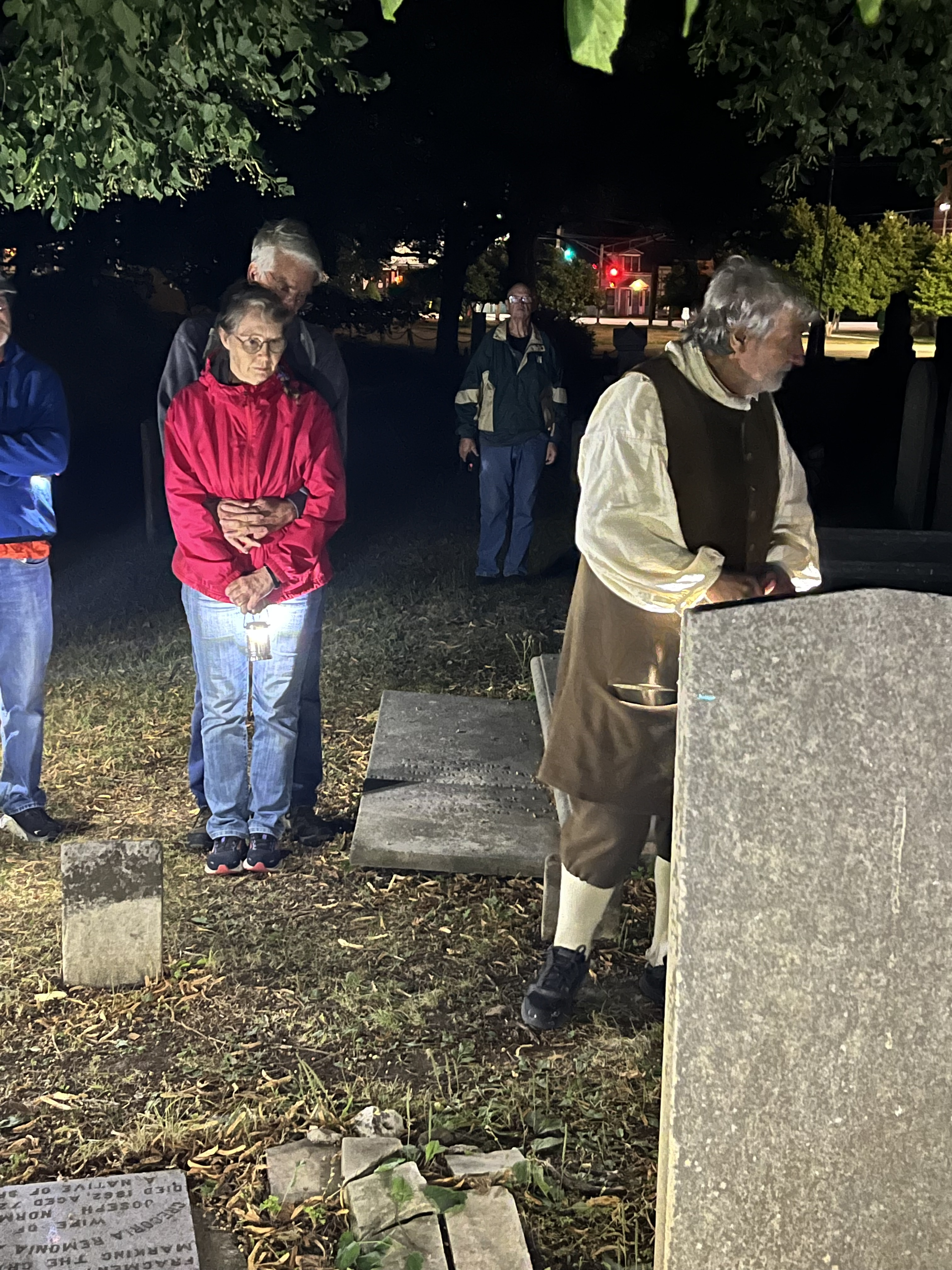
- Garrison Cemetery Tour
- Interactive map of Garrison Cemetery; Le cimetière de la garnison

Details
- Established: by 1636 (possibly earlier)
- Closed: 1940
- Location: Annapolis Royal
- Country: Canada
- Coordinates: 44.7420°N 65.5170°W
- Owned by: Parks Canada
- No. of graves: 2,000+
- Website: https://parks.canada.ca/lhn-nhs/ns/fortanne/visit/carte-map/guidedevisiteur-visitorguide#garrisongraveyard
- Find a Grave: Garrison Cemetery; Le cimetière de la garnison

National Historic Site of Canada
- Official name: Fort Anne National Historic Site
- Designated: 1917

Garrison Cemetery is a historic cemetery located on the grounds of Fort Anne National Historic Site in Annapolis Royal, Nova Scotia, Canada. Although the area was settled by the French since 1605, the earliest recorded burial dates from 1636. The cemetery has associations with Fort Anne itself, the 17th century Acadian Church of Saint John the Baptist and later with the early 19th century Saint Luke's Anglican Church. The last burial occurred in 1940.

== History ==
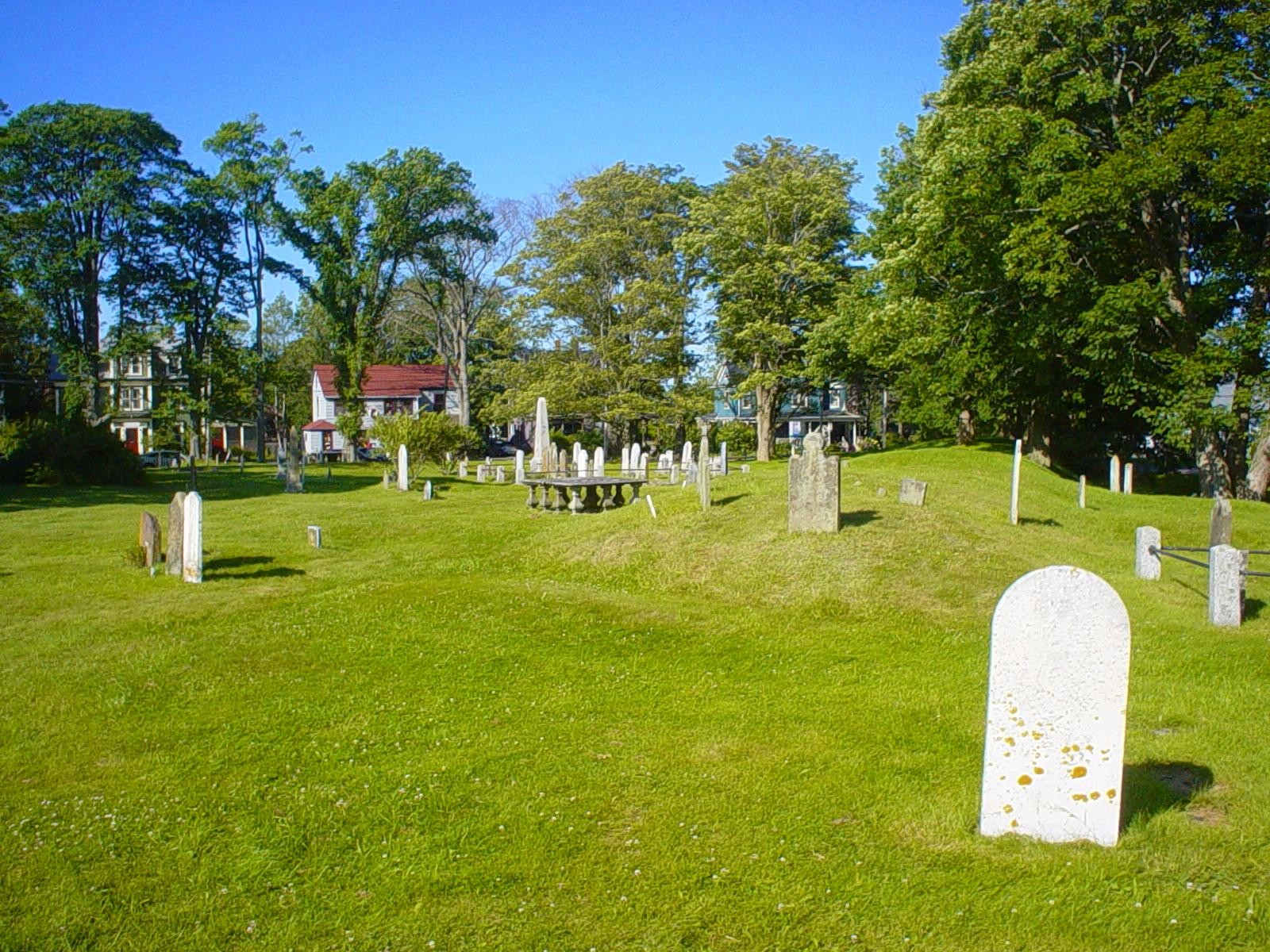
The Garrison Cemetery is on the grounds of Fort Anne, Canada's oldest National Historic Site

There are no definitive surviving records of when the Garrison Cemetery was first used for Christian burial. For over 400 years, it has been the location of several layers of settlement activity. In 1606, the immediate area was first used for agriculture by the French. The first Christian burial of a Mi'kmaw, that of Grand Chief Henri Membertou, occurred in 1611 at an unknown location in the Port Royal area. During the winter of 1629/1630, 30 Scottish settlers perished at the adjacent Charles Fort. There are no records of the location of their remains. From the mid 1600s, two Catholic religious orders, the Capuchins, and later the Recollects, operated monasteries in the vicinity.

The earliest record of a burial is from 1636, the same year that Governor D'Aulnay re-established Port-Royal as the capital of the New France territory of Acadia. At that time, the small plateau of land, now comprising the Fort Anne NHS, was the centre of the settlement's activity. It contained numerous dwellings and gardens, the church, the governor's residence and the original fort. The area was completely reshaped with the construction of the current star-fort, which began in 1702.

Although it is believed that over 2,000 people may be buried in the cemetery, only 234 tombstones remain. The earliest remaining tombstone is from 1720, that of Bethiah Douglass who died October 1, 1720, in her 37th year. The Douglass marker is the oldest English gravestone in situ in Canada.

Rose Fortune (1774–1864), a Black Loyalist and the first female police officer in what is now Canada is buried here. The pioneering educator Andrew Henderson (1797–1869) was also buried there.

From plaque at cemetery:

Two cemeteries are located in this burial ground: the earlier Acadian parish cemetery and the later Church of England cemetery. The wooden markers once placed on most of the graves have long since decayed. The gravestones that remain represent only a small portion of the burials here. Starting in the middle section, the Roman Catholic parish of St. Jean Baptiste located its cemetery in the area. Acadians from the Port-Royal French soldiers and administrators along with their families were buried here. There are no original signs of this cemetery visible. When the British took the fort in 1710, they established a cemetery. This burial ground served the garrison and the Town of Annapolis Royal from 1710 until 1940.

== Notable interments ==
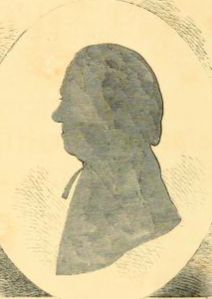
Rev. Jacob Bailey

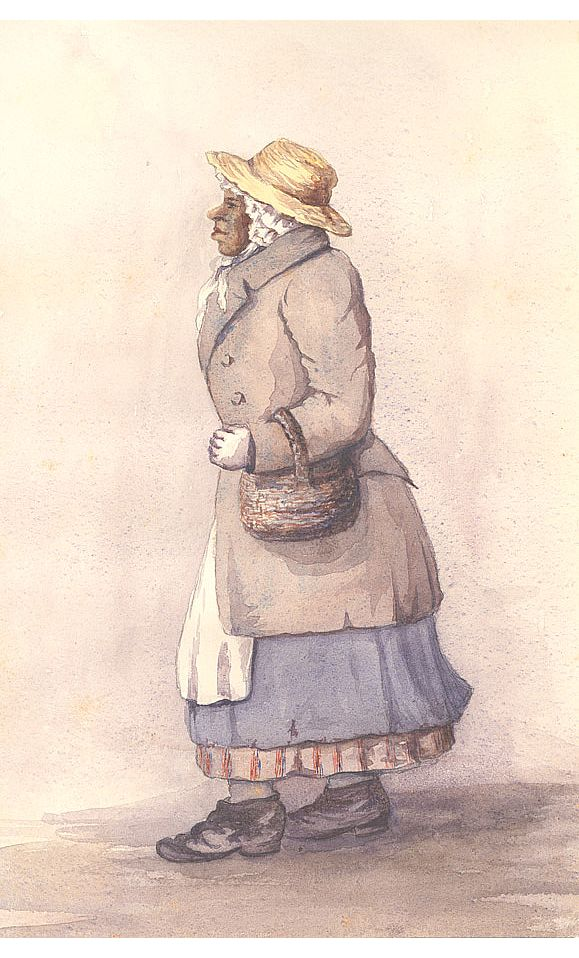
Rose Fortune

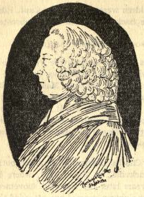
Rev. Thomas Wood 1st Church of England Minister at Annapolis Royal
- Rev. Thomas Wood died 1778, Church of England minister
- John Ritchie died 1790, member of Nova Scotia House of Assembly
- Rev. Jacob Bailey died 1808, Church of England minister
- William Robertson died 1811, member of Nova Scotia House of Assembly
- Peleg Wiswall died 1836, member of Nova Scotia House of Assembly
- Thomas Ritchie died 1852, member of Nova Scotia House of Assembly
- Andrew Henderson died 1869, local schoolmaster
- Rose Fortune died 1864, Canadian businesswoman
- John Robertson died 1872, member of Nova Scotia House of Assembly

== See also ==
- Old Burying Ground (Halifax, Nova Scotia)
- Royal Navy Burying Ground (Halifax, Nova Scotia)
- Fort Moncton – oldest British military gravestones in region
- Church of Saint John the Baptist (Port Royal)
- Saint Luke's Church (Annapolis Royal)
