= List of Seigneuries of New France =

List of Seigneuries of New France by order of the first concession. Seigneuries were an area that was used at the time of New France

== 1604 to 1625: First Concessions ==
- Port-Royal (1604)
- Acadie (1611)
- Sault-au-Matelot (1623)
- Cap de Tourmente (1624)
- Notre-Dame-des-Anges (1626)

== 1625 to 1644 : Concessions under de Lévis ==
Starting in 1627, it was the New France Company "Compagnie de la Nouvelle-France" who administered New France.

- Saint-Joseph (1626)
- Godefroy (1633)
- Hertel (1633)
- de Beauport (1634)
- des Jésuites (1634)
- La Clousterie (1634)
- Du Buisson (1634)
- La Citière (1635)
- de la Côte-de-Beaupré (1636)
- de l'Île de Montréal (1636)
- Île-Jésus (1636)
- de La Madeleine (1636) (not to be confused with the seigneurie of Cap-de-la-Madeleine of 1651)
- de Lauzon (1636)
- de la Rivière-au-Griffon (1636)
- de Sainte-Croix (1637)
- Sainte-Foy (1637)
- de Bellechasse (1637)
- des Grondines (1637)
- d'Autray (1637)
- Lintot (1637)
- Dutort (1637)
- Île-au-Ruau (1638)
- Pinguet (1638)
- de Batiscan (1639)
- Deschambault (1640)
- Saint-Sulpice (1640)
- Arbre-à-la-Croix (1644)
- Marsolet (1644)

== 1644 to 1660 : concessions under François-Christophe de Levy ==
- Rivière-du-Sud (1646)
- Du Hérisson (1646)
- Préville (1646)
- Saint-Ignace (1647)
- Saint-Gabriel (1647)
- Repentigny (1647)
- Portneuf (1647)
- Cournoyer (1647)
- Marsolet (1647)
- Cap-Rouge (1647)
- Rivière-Puante (1647)
- La Prairie de la Madeleine (1647)
- Maur (1647)
- Vieuxpont (1649)
- Jacques-Cartier (1649)
- Beaulieu (1649)
- Monceaux (1649)
- Saint-Augustin (1650)
- Cap-de-la-Madeleine (1651)
- Sillery (1651)
- Le Chesnay (1651)
- La ferté (1651)
- Beaumarchais (1651)
- Gaspésie (1652)
- Gaudarville (1652)
- L'Assomption (1652)
- Roche-brûlée (1652)
- Lothainville (1652)
- Argentenay (1652)
- Charny-Lirec (1652)
- Les Écureuils (1653)
- Grosbois (1653)
- Mille-Vaches (1653)
- Dombourg (1653)
- La Malbaie (1653)
- Île Saint-Christophe (1654)
- Sainte-Ursule (1654)
- Nazareth (1654)
- Île Saint-Joseph (1655)
- Lafond (1655)
- Saint-François (1655)
- Cinquième-Rivière (1656)
- Grande-Anse (1656)
- Normanville (1656)
- Notre-Dame de Québec (1656)
- Sainte-Marie (1656)
- Bécancour (1657)
- Coulonge (1657)
- Îles Bourdon (1657)
- Île Marie (1657)
- Longueuil (1657)
- Closse (1658)
- Saint-Vilmé (1658)
- Sainte-Anne (1658)
- Grandpré de la Redoute (1659)
- Saint-Joseph (no 2) (1659)

== 1660 to 1661 : concessions under Isaac Pas ==
- Saint-Michel (1660)
- Île-aux-Cochons (1660)
- Niverville (1660)
- Saint-Jean (1661)
- La Chevalerie (1661)
- La Grossardière (1661)
- Mesnu (1661)
- Miville (1661)
- Morel (1661)

== 1662 to 1686 : concessions under d'Estrades ==
=== Jusqu'en 1665 : concessions by the Compagnie de la Nouvelle-France ===
- Poirier (1662)
- Lotbinière (1662)
- Crevier (1662)
- Cap-de-Chaste (1662)
- Bon-Port et Bonne-Pêche (1662)
- Île-au-Canot (1662)
- Île Patience (1662)
- Repentigny-Villiers (1662)
- Repentigny (no 2) (1662)
- Lafresnaye (1662)
- Saint-François-des-Prés (1662)
- Villeray (1663)
- Rivière-du-Saumon (1663)

=== 1665 to 1672 : concessions by the intendant Talon ===
- La Gauchetière (1665)
- Des Islets (1671)
- Dorvilliers (1672)
- Matane (1672)
- Tilly (Villieu) (1672)
- L'île Perrot (1672)

=== 1672 to 1682 : concessions by the governor Frontenac ===
- Saint-Germain (Bellevue) (1672)
- La Durantaye (1672)
- Châteauguay (1673)
- Pointe-à-l'Orignal (1674)
- Petite-Nation (1674)
- Kamouraska (1674)
- Mitis (1675)
- Bic (1675)
- Port-Joly (1677)
- Argenteuil (1680)

=== 1682 to 1686 : concessions by the governor Meulles ===
- Mille-Îles (1683)
- Île-Verte (1684)

== 1686 to 1707 : concessions under Jean d'Estrée ==
=== 1686 to 1705 : concessions by Jean Bochart de Champigny ===
- Rimouski (1688)
- Pachot (1689)
- Lac-Mitis (1693)
- Lac-Matapédia (1694)
- Lepage-et-Thibierge (1696)
- Lessard (1696)
- Grand-Pabos (1696)
- Hubert (1698)
- Soulanges (1702)
- Vaudreuil (1702)

=== 1701 à 1705 : concessions by Jacques-François de Monbeton de Brouillan ===
- Koessanouskek (1703)

== 1707 to 1737 : concessions under Victor Marie d'Estrées ==
- Cloridan (1707)
- Montarville (1710)
- Mille-Îles (1714) (Reconcession)
- Lac-des-Deux-Montagnes (1717)
- Villechauve ou Beauharnois (1729)
- Rigaud (1732)
- Nouvelle-Longueuil (1734)
- Rigaud-De Vaudreuil (1736)
- Saint-Joseph-de-Beauce (1736)
- Aubert Gallion(Gayon) (1736)
- Aubin de L’Isle (1736)

== Final concessions ==
- Maska (1748)
- Nicolas-Rioux (1751)
- Bellefeuille (1752)
- Shoolbred (1788)
- Senneville (?)

== See also ==
=== Related articles ===
- List of seignories of Quebec

=== Bibliography ===
- Marcel Trudel, Les Débuts du régime seigneurial au Canada, Fides, Montréal, 1974, 313 p.

=== Sources ===
- Commission de toponymie du Québec
