= Daurene Lewis =

Canadian politician and educator

Mayor of Annapolis Royal
- In office 1984–1988

Personal details
- Born: Daurene Elaine Lewis; September 9, 1943 Annapolis Royal, Nova Scotia
- Died: January 26, 2013 (aged 69) Halifax, Nova Scotia
- Party: Liberal

Daurene Elaine Lewis, CM (September 9, 1943 – January 26, 2013), was a Canadian politician and educator. She was the first Black female mayor in Canada.

== Early life and education ==
Born in Annapolis Royal, Nova Scotia in 1943, Lewis was a descendant of freed Loyalist African Americans who settled in Annapolis Royal in 1783. She was a descendant of Rose Fortune, a Virginian who became the first female police officer in North America.

Trained as a registered nurse, Lewis held a diploma in teaching in schools of nursing from Dalhousie University, a Master of Business Administration from Saint Mary's University, and in 1993 was awarded an honorary doctorate in humane letters from Mount Saint Vincent University.

== Political career ==
Lewis first formal political involvement was in 1979, running for town council in Annapolis Royal. Her issues included increasing awareness of the area's history, and attempts at community revitalization. She was appointed as deputy mayor in 1982 working alongside Mayor George Richardson.

In 1984, Lewis was elected mayor of Annapolis Royal, making her the first female black mayor in Canada.

Lewis attempted to enter provincial politics in the 1988 election, making an unsuccessful bid to represent Annapolis West in the Nova Scotia House of Assembly for the Liberal Party. She was the first black woman in Nova Scotia to run in a provincial election.

== After politics ==
Lewis was the former executive director of the Centre for Women in Business at Mount Saint Vincent University. She was principal of both the Institute of Technology and Akerley Campuses of the Nova Scotia Community College. In 2001 she became the first African Canadian senior administrator in the history of the college. She completed an extended terms on the board of directors of Canada Post and the Governor General's Order of Canada Advisory Council. She was on the executive of the Vanier Institute of the Family and the Maritime Conservatory of Performing Arts. She was a member of the International Women's Foundation.

She died in a Halifax hospital in 2013.

== Honours, decorations, awards and distinctions ==
In 1994 Lewis was added to the Black Cultural Centre Wall of Honour. In 1995, she was recipient of the United Nations Global Citizenship Award. In 1998 she received the Progress Club of Halifax Woman of Excellence award for Public Affairs and Communication. In 2002, she was made a Member of the Order of Canada and received the YWCA volunteer award. She received both the Queen's Jubilee Medal and the Queen Elizabeth II Diamond Jubilee Medal.

In 2018, the Annapolis Royal town hall plaza was named after Lewis in a ceremony in which a bronze bust by sculptor Ruth Abernethy was unveiled.

== See also ==
- Black Canadian
