= Lordship of Lac-des-Deux-Montagnes =

Seigneury in New France

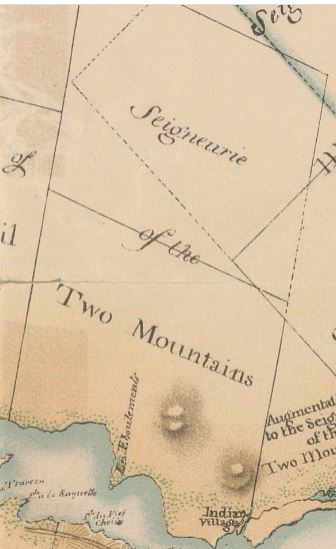
Detail of 1796 map by surveyor Duberger.

The lordship of Lac-des-Deux-Montagnes was a seigneury in New France. It was located in the current regional county municipality of Deux-Montagnes Regional County Municipality in the administrative region of Laurentides in Quebec (Canada).

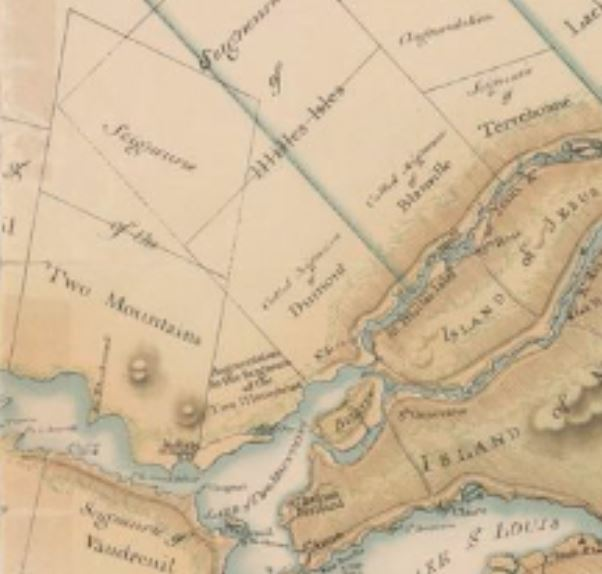
Map of 1793&94 by surveyors Gage & Duberger of the seigneuries of Lac-des-Deux-Montagnes and surroundings.

== Geography ==
The seigneury of Lac-des-Deux-Montagnes was located northwest of lac des Deux Montagnes, hence its name. The seigneury covered an area of 6.5 of front on 3 of depth. The area of the seigneury was 630 kilometres (391.46 mi). It was bounded on the west by the seigneury of Argenteuil, on the north and north-east by the seigneuries of Mille-Isles, Bellefeuille and Rivière-du-Chêne.

== History ==
The governor Philippe de Rigaud de Vaudreuil granted the seigneury to the "Compagnie de Saint-Sulpice de Paris" in 1717. The act of ratification was issued some 16 years later, in 1733, by Governor Beauharnois, however with an enlargement of the area of 40%. The act was ratified in 1735. The seigneury is part of the seigneurial administrative division of Montreal. After the War of the Conquest, in 1764, the Compagnie de Saint-Sulpice de Paris sold the seigneury to the Sulpicians of Montreal. More than 80% of the territory of the seigneury was granted before 1840.

The territory of the seigneury is the subject of claims by the Mohawk Council of Kanesatake, this claim having led to the Oka crisis in 1990. In 2008, the Federal Ministry of Crown-Indigenous Relations and Northern Development Canada agreed that the file relating to the seigneury of Lac-des-Deux-Montagnes or a specific claim. However, the band council indicates that it was agreed that this file should be considered third-rate, that is to say, not the subject of a comprehensive claim or a specific claim. The Mohawks dispute the ministry's claim that the Sulpicians are the "full owners and in perpetuity" of the entire seigneury "and the rights of the natives are limited to the lands they occupy, excluding the hunting grounds. They argue that the Treaty of Paris, the Treaty of Oswesgatchie and the Royal Proclamation recognize their rights over the entire seigneury and that their rights were not protected by Canada, the Mohawks never having been informed of the land transactions relating to the seigneury.

== Posterity ==
The name of the seigneury has been perpetuated throughout history to several geographical entities located on its territory, in particular the city of Deux-Montagnes, the county of Deux-Montagnes, the provincial electoral district of Deux-Montagnes, the federal district of Deux-Montagnes, the Deux-Montagnes line of the banlieue train, the Deux-Montagnes station. A cheese produced by the Fromagerie of Oka bears the name the Seigneurie du Lac-des-Deux-Montagnes.

== See also ==
- List of seignories of Quebec
- Seigneurial system of New France
- List of Seigneuries of New France
- Deux-Montagnes Regional County Municipality
- Kanesatake
- Oka crisis
