= Rose Fortune =

Canadian businesswoman (1774–1864)

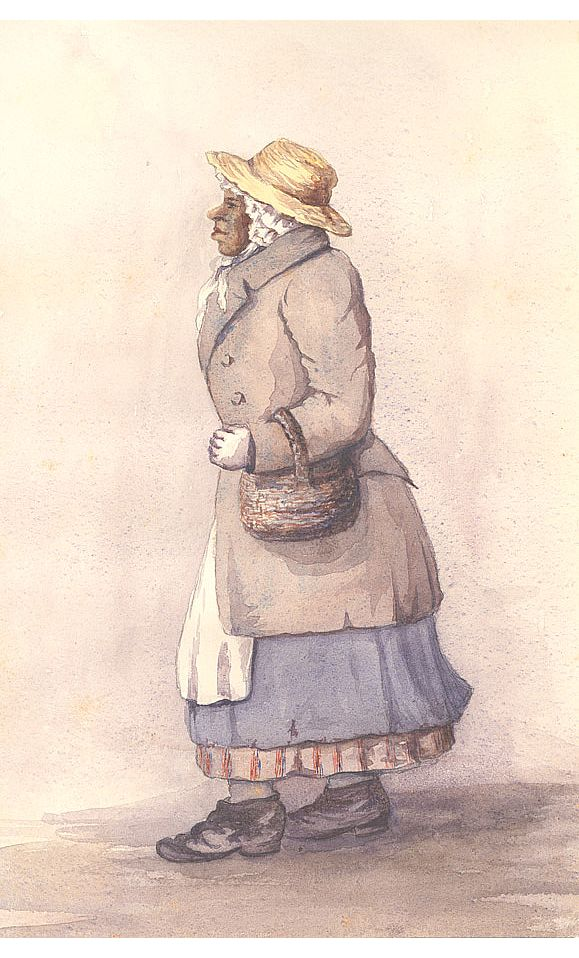
- Born: March 13, 1774; Philadelphia, Province of Pennsylvania
- Died: February 20, 1864 (aged 89); Annapolis Royal, Nova Scotia

Rose Fortune (March 13, 1774 – February 20, 1864) was a child born in or around Philadelphia of runaway slaves. Her parents became Black Loyalists during the American Revolutionary War when they pledged to be loyal to the British Army in exchange for their freedom. At around the age of 10, Rose was among the approximately 3,000 Black Loyalists who sailed from New York City to Nova Scotia in 1783. She had at least three children and is thought to have been married twice. At about 50 years of age she began a business transporting luggage in a wheelbarrow from the Annapolis ferry docks to hotels and houses. By the early 1840s, she was using horse-drawn carriages to convey the luggage. She acted as the first female police officer in North America when she chose to institute and enforce curfews to keep the streets safe at night. Fortune is remembered for her business sense, strength, and courage.

== Early life ==
Rose Fortune was born in Philadelphia, Pennsylvania (Note: Rose Fortune is also said to have been born in Virginia, but her parents ran away from Virginia in 1773.) about March 13, 1774, to her parents Fortune and Aminta, of African, Madagascarian, and South American descent. (Note: As the result of DNA tests of three of Rose Fortune's descendants and as a result of the runaway slave advertisement of Fortune and Aminta placed in the Virginia Gazette Newspaper of April 21, 1773, we now know that Rose Fortune had ancestors that came from not only Africa but also South America and Madagascar. Brenda J. Thompson, author from Annapolis Royal, had DNA tests performed on three of Rose Fortune's descendants.)

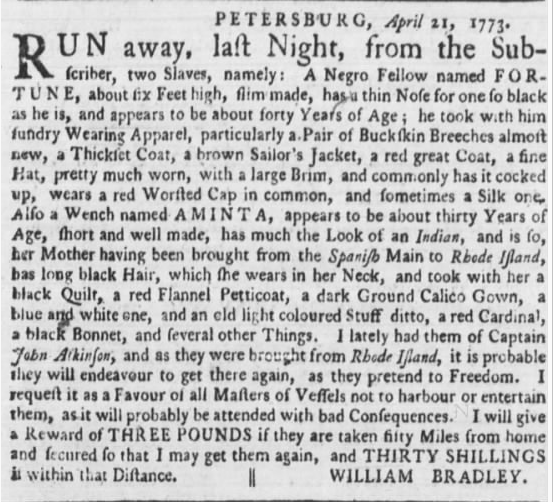
Run Away notice, April 29, 1773, Virginia Gazette regarding Fortune and Aminta

A year before her birth, her parents were identified in a runaway slave advertisement in Virginia. Written in Petersburg, Virginia by William Bradley, the ad was published in the Virginia Gazette on April 29, 1773. Fortune and Aminta ran away on April 20. Fortune was thought to have been about 40 years of age (born about 1733), of a slim build, and about six feet tall. He left with warm clothing. Aminta appeared to be Native American with long black hair and around 30 years of age (born about 1743). Besides the clothes she was wearing, she ran away with a quilt. Bradley offered an award of three pounds. Fortune and Aminta were brought to Virginia from Rhode Island by Captain John Atkinson. Aminta's mother was said to have come to Rhode Island from the Spanish Main. It was thought that they might have returned to Rhode Island. They were believed to have been owned by members of the Devone family of Virginia.

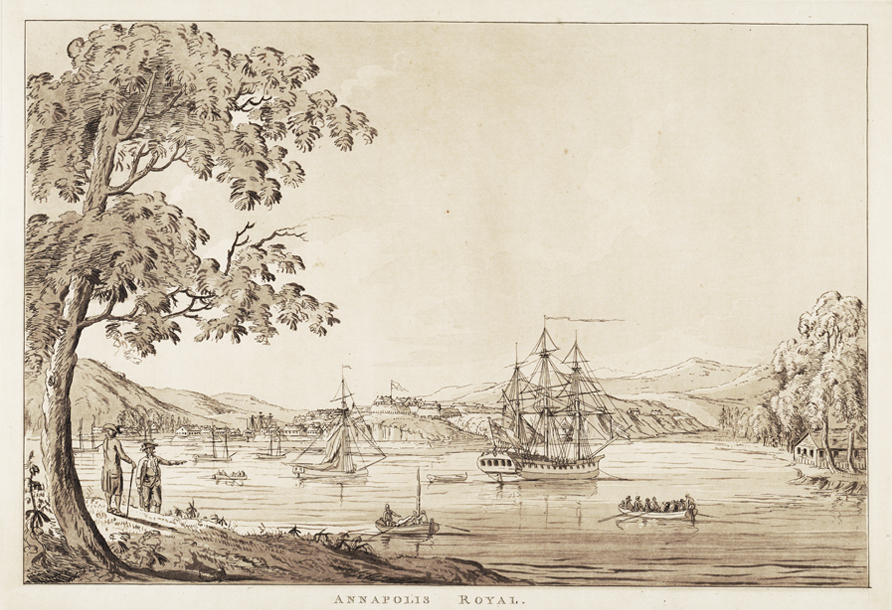
Joseph Frederick Wallet DesBarres, Annapolis Royal, Nova Scotia, 1781

During the American Revolutionary War, the British offered freedom to runaway slaves and free blacks if they provided their loyalty. Fortune's family were among the 3,000 Black Loyalists who supported the British during the war and at the end of the war were transported from New York to Nova Scotia, a British territory. In 1783, they relocated to Annapolis Royal, when she was 10 or more years old. (Note: She was not on any of the lists of ships that carried Black Loyalists to Nova Scotia.) She was enumerated under the column "child above ten" on the Annapolis County muster roll for her father Fortune in June 1784. Baptismal records of Rev. Roger Veits seem to indicate that Rose was living in Freeport, Long Island, Nova Scotia in the year 1795.

== Career ==
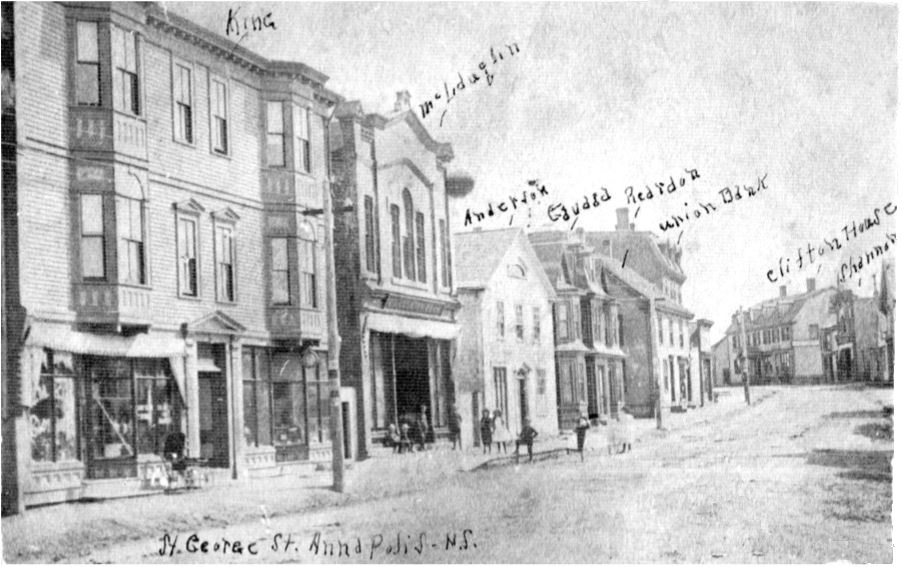
St. George Street, Annapolis

She started her own business when Black Canadians and especially women were not encouraged to do so. Around 1825, Rose began carting passengers’ luggage between the Saint John-Digby-Annapolis ferry docks and nearby homes and hotels. She also met ferries from Boston. She became a trusted figure for travellers, helping them find accommodation and ensuring they made their connections to schooners and steamships.

In 1841, her business became known as Lewis Transfer and that year, or three years later, she used horse-drawn wagons to transport luggage. She woke up guests at inns so that they could meet their ferries on time. One of her regular customers was Thomas Chandler Haliburton, judge of the Supreme Court from 1841 to 1856, whom she woke so that he could travel to Digby in time for court.

I was aided in my hasty efforts to quit the abominable inn by a curious old Negro woman, rather stunted in growth ... and dressed in a man’s coat and felt hat; she had a small stick in her hand which she applied lustily to the backs of all who did not jump instantly out of the way. Poor old dame! She was evidently a privileged character.

— Lieutenant-Colonel Sleigh of the 77th Regiment, 1852

She was well known by the town's leaders and she had limited competition due to her reputation. Her strength, trustworthiness, honesty and constant presence on the waterfront led her to become entrusted with safeguarding property and maintaining order on the wharves and warehouses of Annapolis Royal, choosing to act as the town's waterfront police officer. For instance, she created and imposed curfews at the wharves to keep boys' behavior in order. She was the only person responsible for law and order in Annapolis for a time and is said to be the first female police officer on the American continent. She worked into her 70s.

== Personal life and death ==
Fortune was married several times, as noted in the St. Luke's Church of England record books. She had two daughters and at least three children. One was Jane Fortune, who married Isaac Godfrey. (Note: Jane's husband, Isaac Godfrey was the son of Edward Godfrey, a Black Loyalist. They were married on December 21, 1830, but had no children. They are buried near the Court House in the Garrison cemetery.) Her son, John, married the sister of Isaac, Hester Godfrey, on January 13, 1838. (Note: John and Hester Fortune had two children, George who died during childbirth and a daughter Joanna Fortune who married George Moses. John and Hester lived in the Annapolis Royal area. John was dead by 1871. Hester lived to at least 1901.) Her daughter Margaret Fortune married John Francis of Digby by 1842. (Note: Between 1842 and 1856, Margaret and John Francis had six children who were baptised in Digby at the Trinity Church of England.)

Fortune helped other blacks escape slavery on the Underground Railroad by leading runaways to locations that were safe.

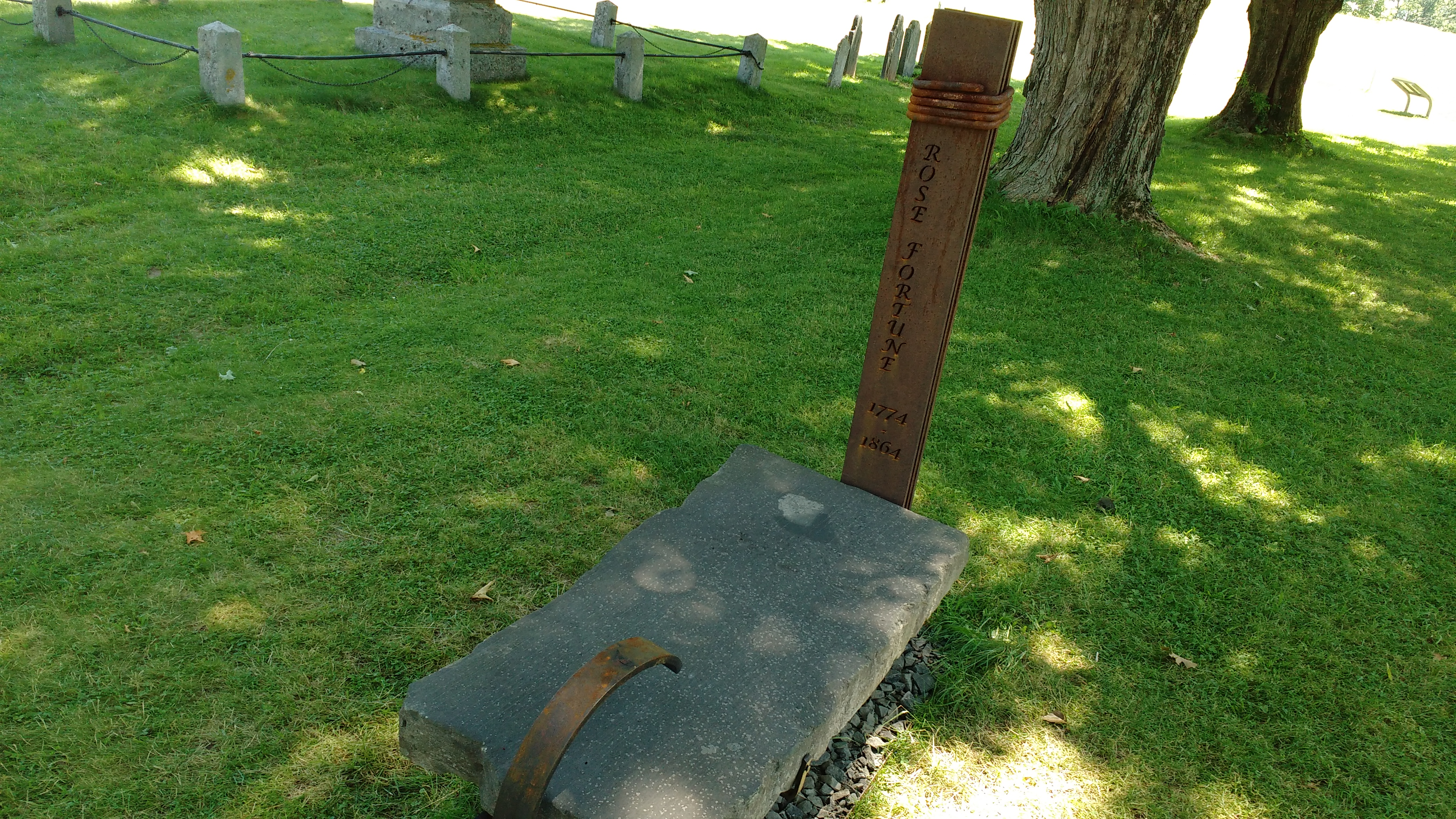
Rose Fortune's memorial marker in Garrison Cemetery

In her later years, she had severe rheumatism and lived near the Union Bank. Rose Fortune died in Nova Scotia on February 20, 1864 (Note: She is also said to have died of February 20, 1867) at around the age of 90. Her funeral was held at St. Luke's, Church of England, Annapolis Royal. She was buried at Garrison Cemetery in Fort Anne in an unmarked location. (Note: She is in St. Luke's records, but perhaps that was because her memorial service was held there.) A monument was created to commemorate her and installed in the cemetery on Canada Day in 2017. Created by sculptor Brad Hall, it uses a stylized wheelbarrow made of iron and stone to evoke her work and the business she founded on the waterfront. The wheelbarrow forms a memorial bench.

== Descendants ==
The business she founded was continued by family for several generations as a stevedore and cartage company, later led by her grandson-in-law Albert Lewis as the Lewis Transfer Company, remaining in business until 1960 or 1980. Albert was married to Fortune's granddaughter Amberzene Lewis. Her direct descendant, Daurene Lewis, was elected Mayor of Annapolis Royal in 1984, being the first African-Canadian woman in Canada to attain that position.

== Legacy ==
When Black Loyalists, like Fortune, came to Nova Scotia they were subject to racial prejudice, barriers to opportunities, and economic marginalization, in which they did not receive pay commensurate with white people. She was also subject to physical threats as a woman. Fortune became a "respected and prominent member of the community" by making her own opportunities. Now she is known among the African-Canadian community for her strength and pride.

The Rose Fortune Gate in Bedford, Nova Scotia, is named after her. In 1999, a plaque in her honour was installed near the location of her house in the Petit Parc on the Annapolis Royal waterfront, part of the Mathieu Da Costa African Heritage Trail. In May 2015, Rose Fortune's first name was bestowed upon the new ferry, the MV Fundy Rose to operate between Digby, Nova Scotia, and Saint John, New Brunswick.

Fortune was named a National Historic Person on January 12, 2018. The plaque was installed by the Historic Sites and Monuments Board of Canada on July 20, 2019, at the waterfront of Annapolis Royal where Rose once worked. It is mounted on a granite boulder donated by Fred Bailey, one of Fortune's descendants, which came from the family's land in Lequille, just outside of Annapolis Royal.

A scholarship, Peter Butler III–Rose Fortune Scholarship Program, was established by the Association of Black Law Enforcers in memory of the initial black police officers in Canada.

== In popular culture ==
- Fortune, a play inspired by the life of Rose Fortune, written by playwright George Cameron Grant, has been performed through the United States and the Maritimes. Grant was inspired by a Candlelight Graveyard tour in 2013, led by Annapolis Royal historian Alan Melanson which featured the unmarked resting place of Rose Fortune. Grant resolved to write the play and start the campaign for the grave monument.
- The film Rhythm Stick to Freedom is the story of her life.
