= Charnizay =

- Commune
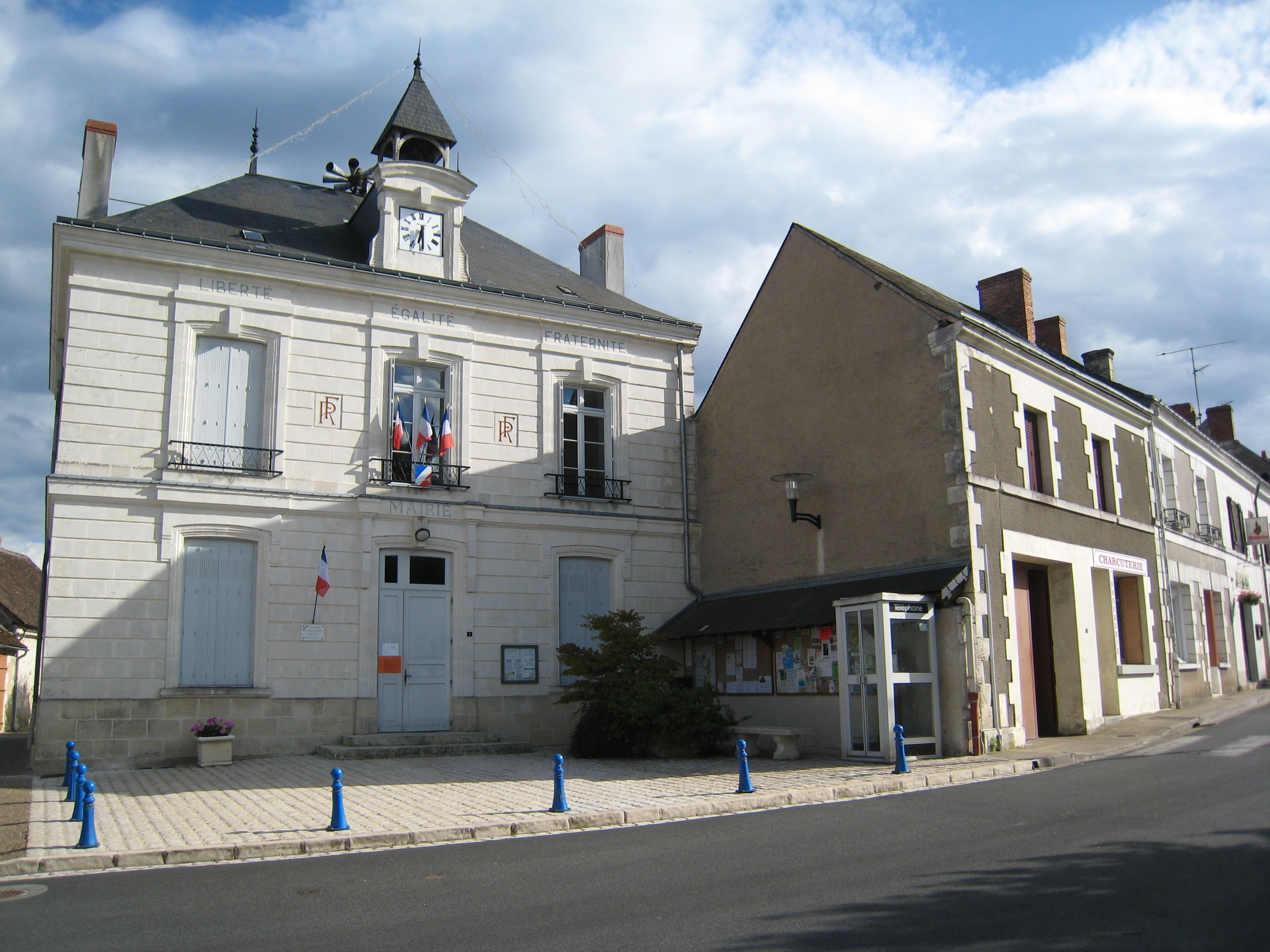
- Town hall
- Location of Charnizay
- Location within France Location within Centre-Val de Loire
- Coordinates: 46°54′51″N 0°59′13″E
- Country: France
- Region: Centre-Val de Loire
- Department: Indre-et-Loire
- Arrondissement: Loches
- Canton: Descartes
- Intercommunality: CC Loches Sud Touraine

Government
  - Mayor (2020–2026): Serge Gervais
- Area^{1}: 51.71 km^{2} (19.97 sq mi)
- Highest elevation: 147 m (482 ft)
- Lowest elevation: 84 m (276 ft)
- Population (2023): 461
  - Density: 8.92/km^{2} (23.1/sq mi)
- Time zone: UTC+01:00 (CET)
  - Summer (DST): UTC+02:00 (CEST)
- INSEE/Postal code: 37061 /37290
- ^{1} French Land Register data, which excludes lakes, ponds, glaciers > 1 km^{2} (0.386 sq mi or 247 acres) and river estuaries.

Charnizay (French pronunciation: [ʃaʁnizɛ]) is a commune in the Indre-et-Loire department in central France.

== History ==
In 1794, Charnizay annexed the commune of Saint Michel des Landes.

== Population ==
Historical population
Year	Pop.	±% p.a.
1968	876	—
1975	738	−2.42%
1982	615	−2.57%
1990	557	−1.23%
1999	523	−0.70%
2007	484	−0.96%
2012	512	+1.13%
2017	502	−0.39%
2023	461	−1.41%
Source: INSEE

== Sights ==
- Dolmen le Palet de Gargantua, near the hamlet of Les Champs de l'Ormeau

== Personalities ==
- Charles de Menou d'Aulnay (1604–1650), named governor of Acadia in 1638.

== See also ==
- Communes of the Indre-et-Loire department
