= Andrew Henderson (schoolmaster) =

Canadian educator (1797–1869)

Andrew Henderson (1797 – April 25, 1869) was a pioneering schoolmaster in Nova Scotia, Canada. He immigrated from Ireland into New Brunswick in 1818 with his wife and two small children. In 1820 he moved to Wilmot, Nova Scotia, where he became a school teacher.

In 1832, he moved to nearby Annapolis Royal and opened a boarding and day school with a grant from the Nova Scotia legislature. In 1837, on a farm outside the town, he set up Albion Vale Academy. This school operated until 1847 when he sold the farm and school. He returned to Annapolis Royal, where he became postmaster, a storekeeper, and a magistrate. Much of what is known about Henderson comes from a letter. He also kept a diary. His remains lie buried in Garrison Cemetery, Annapolis Royal.
