= Françoise-Marie Jacquelin =

Acadian woman (1621–1645)

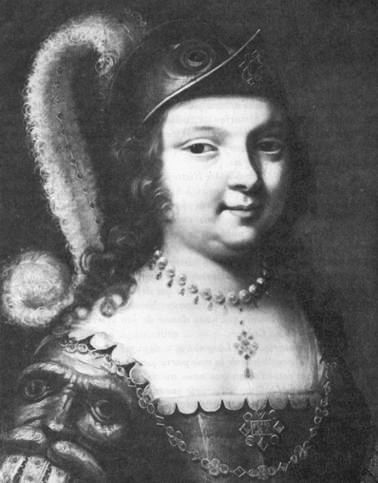
- Born: 1621; Nogent-le-Rotrou, France
- Died: 1645 (aged 23–24); Fort La Tour
- Military career
- Nickname: Heroine of Acadia
- Conflicts: Acadian Civil War

Françoise-Marie Jacquelin (1621–1645) was an Acadian woman, wife of Charles de Saint-Étienne de la Tour, who is famous for her defense of Fort la Tour during the Acadian Civil War.

== Biography ==
Françoise-Marie Jacquelin was born and baptized on 18 July 1621 in Nogent-le-Rotrou. According to Charles de Menou d'Aulnay, Jacquelin was the daughter of an actress in Paris. According to others, she was the daughter of a doctor, or of a businesswoman.

In 1640 she sailed from France to Port Royal to marry de la Tour. They settled at Fort la Tour at the mouth of the St. John River.

Jacquelin quickly became involved in the Acadian Civil War, her husband's struggle with Charles de Menou d'Aulnay for control of Acadia. She evaded a blockade d'Aulnay had established and returned to France to plead her husband's case to the king. She returned to Acadia with a warship laden with supplies for Fort la Tour.

In 1645, while la Tour was in Boston, d'Aulnay attacked the fort. Jacquelin assumed command of the garrison there, refused to surrender, and led a pitched three-day battle to defend the fort. On the fourth day, with the walls of the fort breached and having taken heavy casualties, Jacquelin surrendered. D'Aulnay executed the surviving soldiers. Madame de La Tour was forced to watch the hangings. She died three weeks later.

== Gallery ==
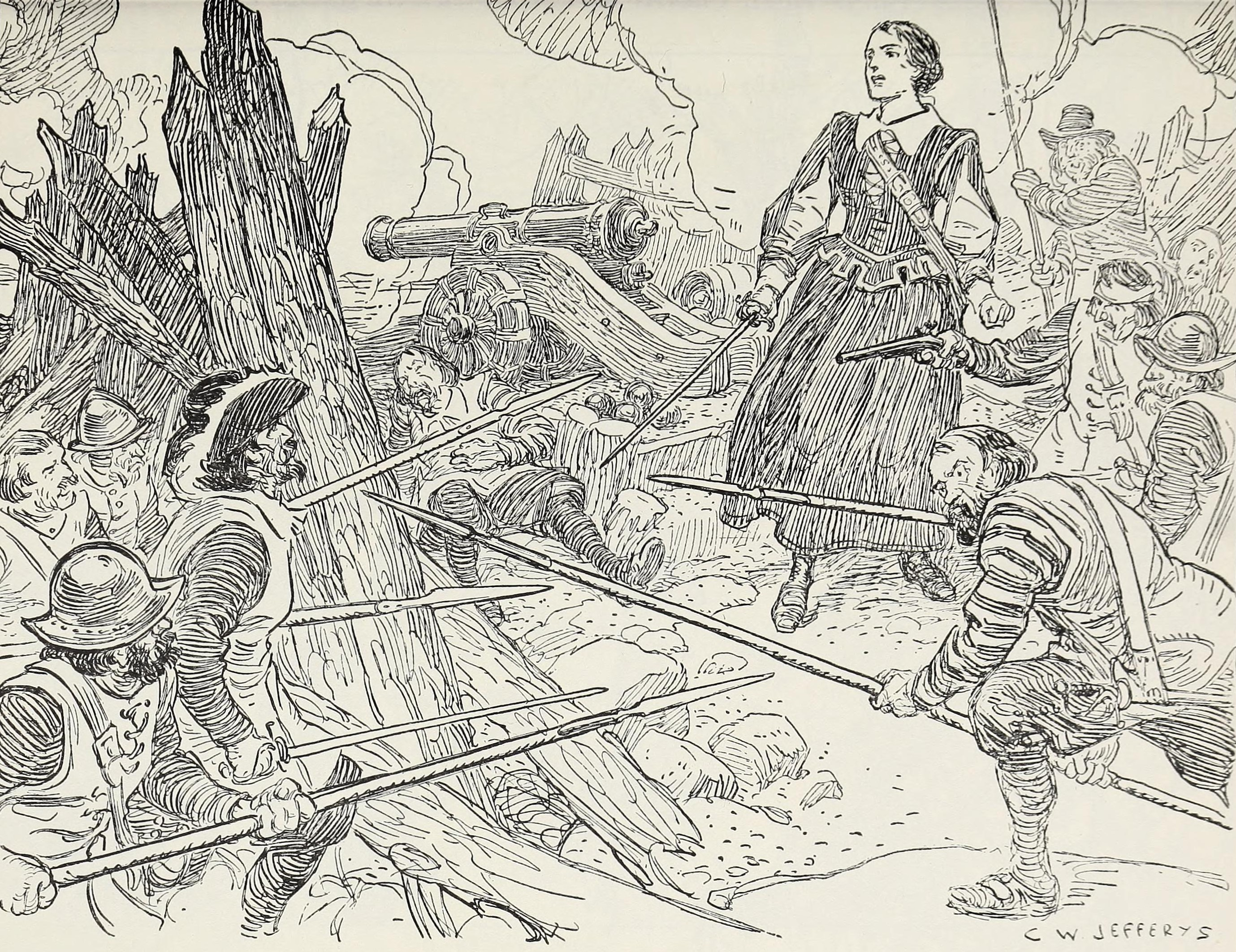
Madame La Tour Defending Fort St. Jean

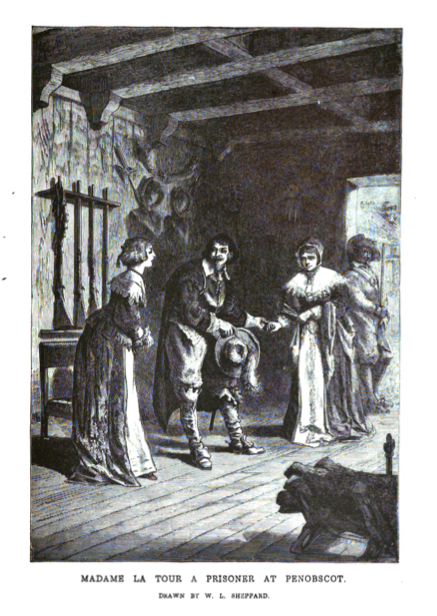
"Madame La Tour a Prisoner at Penobscot", by W L Sheppard

== See also ==
- Military history of Nova Scotia
