= Lordship of Port-Royal =

Seigneury in New France

- Seigneury de Port-Royal
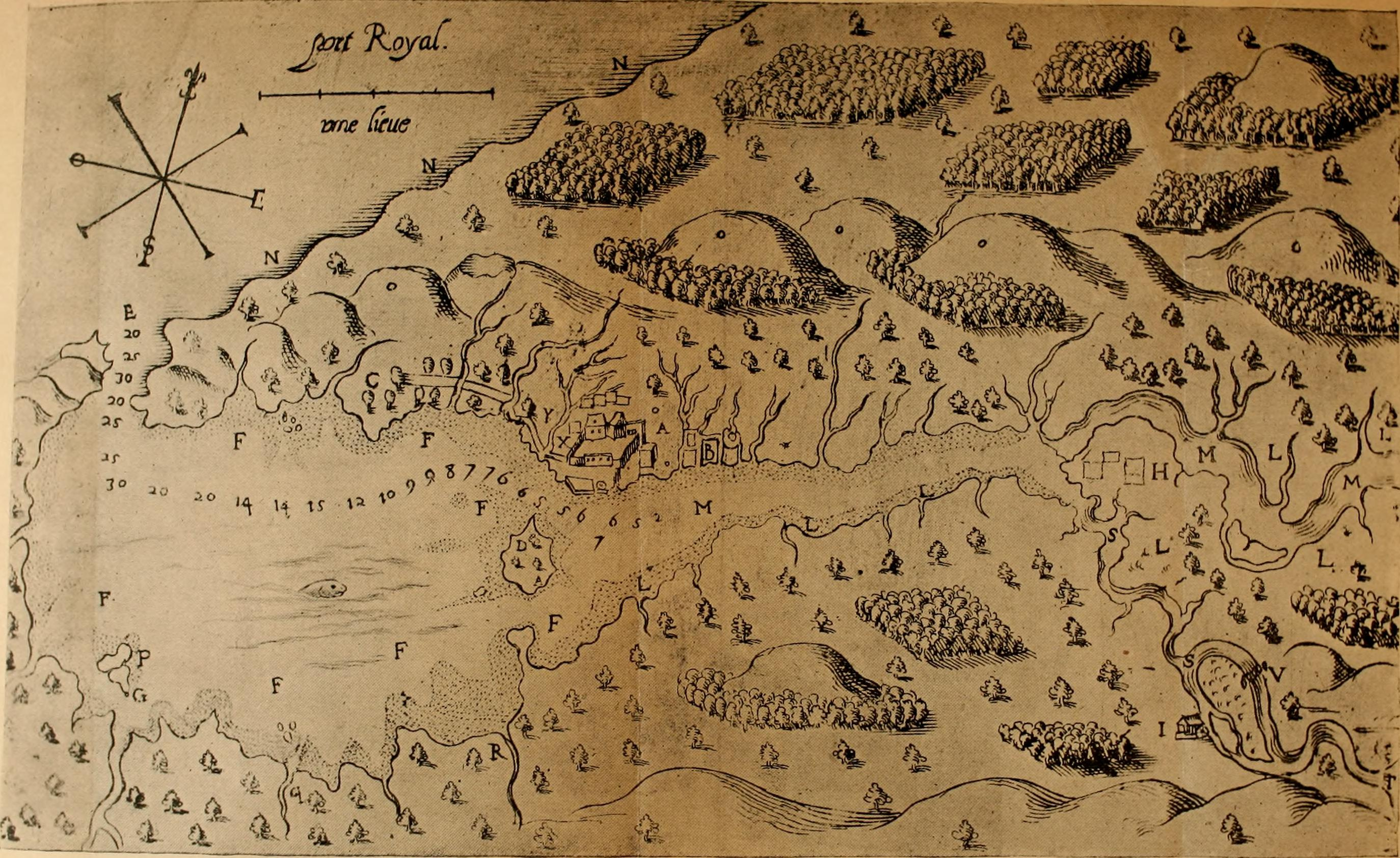
- Lordship in 1607

- Location within Nova Scotia
- Coordinates: 44°44′29″N 65°30′48″W

The lordship of Port-Royal was a seigneury in New France. It was located within the present-day counties of Annapolis and Digby and was centred around the historic town of Port-Royal, Acadia, now Annapolis Royal, Nova Scotia (Canada) - it was established in 1604 for Jean de Poutrincourt. As the earliest land grant in New France, the seigneury holds particular historical significance in the development of French colonial presence in North America.

== Geographic area ==
The lordship covered the watershed of the modern Annapolis Basin and Annapolis River. In the 1600s, these two bodies of water were known respectively as "Port-Royal" and the "Rivière du Dauphin". The lordship was bordered on the north by the lordship of Les Mines, which began at the Cornwallis River, and ended in the south at Saint Mary's River. By 1686, the seigneurial manor was located in Port-Royal (renamed Annapolis Royal in 1710) between present-day Saint Anthony Street and the Annapolis River

== History ==
The lordship was first granted to Jean de Poutrincourt in 1604 by Pierre Dugua, Sieur de Mons, Lieutenant General of New France, and was reaffirmed by King Henry IV of France on February 25, 1606. Poutrincourt expanded the habitation, built a grist mill, and cleared the land of what would later become the present-day town of Annapolis Royal.

Poutrincourt granted the lordship to his son, Charles de Biencourt de Saint-Just in 1613. There are limited records of the activity at the lordship after 1613, but Charles de Biencourt was still petitioning for further settlers to arrive in 1618. After Charles de Biencourt's death in 1623, the ownership of the lordship was disputed, as Charles De La Tour claimed that Charles de Biencourt passed all rights to himself, while in France, all inheritances were deemed to have passed to Charles de Biencourt's younger brother, Jacques.

In 1632, under the Treaty of Saint-Germain-en-Laye, France regained control of Acadia, and Isaac de Razilly was appointed lieutenant-general of the region by Cardinal Richelieu. Razilly chose La Hève as his administrative base but took formal possession of the lordship of Port-Royal. He encouraged migration from France, dispatched settlers and supplies to Port-Royal, and re-established agriculture, fisheries, and trade. Razilly's administration sought to stabilize relations with the Mi’kmaq and strengthen the colony's economy, laying the groundwork for renewed French presence in Acadia. His death in 1635 led his brother, Claude de Launay-Rasilly, to assume ownership of the lordship. Charles de Menou d’Aulnay was Claude's lieutenant in Acadia and administered the colony. D'Aulnay re-established Port-Royal as the main base of operations in Acadia and, by 1636, ownership of the lordship of Port-Royal officially passed to d'Aulnay.

In 1649, the first known reference to the seigniorial manor is recorded. D'Aulnay and his wife were noted as living in “their chateau and seigneurial manor of the said Port-Royal...[where one of their habitants was to deliver each year]...on the eve of the Feast of Kings...a round cake made of a quarter of bushel of the finest white wheat flour kneaded and half a dozen eggs, a half pound of butter of the very freshest kind, in the edge of which cake they will place a black bean.”

Upon d'Aulnay's death in 1650, the ownership of the lordship was again in dispute - this time between Jeanne Motin, d'Aulnay's widow, and Emmanuel Le Borgne, a major creditor of the d'Aulnay estate. Jeanne Motin appeared as the most legitimate claimant, although she was in a weak financial and political position.

In 1653 Jeanne Motin, married Acadian Governor, Charles De La Tour, an act which strengthened her claim. Disturbances in the lordship occurred again in 1654 with the armed arrival of Emmanuel Le Borgne from France, and followed later that year by the English invasion of Acadia.

When French control was re-established in 1670, Alexandre Le Borgne, son of Emmanuel, successfully asserted his claim on the lordship. Around 1675, he married Marie de Saint-Étienne De La Tour, eldest daughter of Charles De La Tour and Jean Motin.

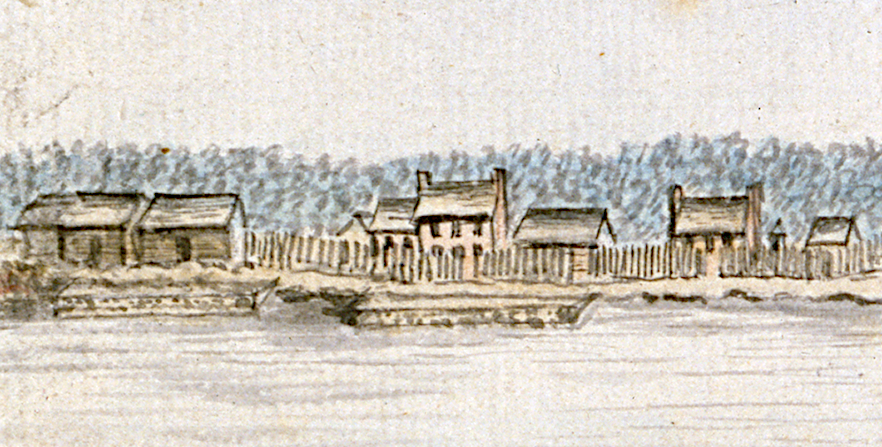
Waterfront of Annapolis Royal (formerly Port-Royal) in 1753

On the death of Alexandre around 1694, his wife, Marie, became the seigneuresse or lady of Port-Royal in her own right. By this time, Marie was not only the lady of Port-Royal, but also of Les Mines, to the north, which included Grand Pré.

The heirs of Charles De La Tour's and Jean Motin's other four children never ceased their legal fight for their rights and were successful in achieving a royal ruling in 1703, which divided the lordship into seven parts - two for the heirs of Emmanuel Le Borgne and five for the heirs of Charles De La Tour and Jeanne Motin. Marie found herself owning only three of the seven parts, but still maintained the social status as lady of Port-Royal. Not only did she lose four sevenths of the lordship, but more significantly, the ruling dissolved her monopoly on fur trading and commercial fishing. The ruling also forbade the lord or any inhabitants from trading alcohol with the Mi'kmaq. Finally, the ruling froze the rents of the habitants, leaving Marie with little more than a landowner's role.

== End of the lordship ==
By 1733, after years of continued disputes between the various claimants to the lordship, the Board of Trade in London settled all claims by paying one of the heirs, Agathe Saint Etienne De La Tour, the sum of £2,000 for the rights to revert to the British Crown. She claimed to represent the interests of all heirs.

Later in 1733, the eldest son of Alexandre Le Borgne and Marie De La Tour took the full oath of allegiance to British Crown and petitioned to have his rights restored, but was refused. His case was based on the fact that the settlement of Agathe De La Tour only applied to the five-sevenths of the La Tour / Motin heirs and not the two-sevenths of the Le Borgne heirs. He received some support member of the Nova Scotia Council, John Adams, but it was not sufficient to sustain his claims.

All habitants of what was now called Annapolis Royal, kept their existing holdings under the pre-agreed rents, but any amount due were to be paid to the Crown.

== Manorial records of Port-Royal ==
The records relating to the lordship were managed by the notary of Port-Royal. The first recorded notary was Domauchin, who wrote up at least one surviving land grant from d'Aulnay. In 1680, Claude Petipas is recorded as serving as a notary during a baptism involving a Native American. He was succeeded by Jacques Couraud, who held the roles of notary and procureur fiscal for Alexandre Le Borgne. After Couraud's departure, Antoine de la Mothe Cadillac, was appointed as notary but never fulfilled the role. As a result, Port-Royal lacked a functioning notary until Jean-Chrysostome Loppinot’s arrival in 1699. In periods where there was no standing notary, other officials or even members of religious orders provided some of the functions.

Notarial and court clerk records were usually stored in private homes, making them vulnerable to destruction by fire or enemy attacks. Most surviving notarial documents from the French period were written by Loppinot and were only preserved because they were in the possession of Mathieu De Goutin on the night a fire destroyed the rest of Loppinot’s records in 1707.

The Lord of Port-Royal would also have maintained a maintained livres terriers and plans terriers—records that detailed and mapped the lands they granted, along with the conditions of tenure. Although no original terriers have survived, early 18th-century correspondence and reports confirm that these records were indeed kept.

== See also ==
- Annapolis Royal
- List of Seigneuries in New France
- Port Royal (Acadia)
- Seigneurial System of New France
