= Seigneurial system of New France =

Semi-feudal manor system of French Canada

A typical layout for a feudal manor in New France

The manorial system of New France, known as the seigneurial system (French: Régime seigneurial, pronounced [ʁeʒim sɛɲœʁjal]), was the semi-feudal system of land tenure used in the North American French colonial empire. Economic historians have attributed the wealth gap between Quebec and other parts of Canada in the 19th and early 20th century to the persistent adverse impact of the seigneurial system.

Both in nominal and legal terms, all French territorial claims in North America belonged to the French king. French monarchs did not impose feudal land tenure on New France, and the king's actual attachment to these lands was virtually non-existent. Instead, landlords were allotted land holdings known as manors and presided over the French colonial agricultural system in North America.

The first grant of manorial land tenure in New France was awarded to Jean de Biencourt de Poutrincourt et de Saint-Just in 1604, with the Seigneury of Port-Royal in Acadia. This grant was reaffirmed by King Henry IV of France on February 25, 1606.

== Expansion of seigneurial system ==
In 1628, Cardinal Richelieu expanded the Seigneurial system through the newly formed Company of One Hundred Associates which included all lands between the Arctic Circle to the north, Florida to the south, Lake Superior in the west, and the Atlantic Ocean in the east. In exchange for this vast land grant and the exclusive trading rights tied to it, the company was expected to bring two to three hundred settlers to New France in 1628, and a subsequent four thousand during the next fifteen years. To achieve this, the Company subinfeudated almost all of the land awarded to it by Cardinal Richelieu – that is, parceled it out into smaller units that were then run on a feudal-like basis and worked by habitants.

The lands were arranged in long narrow strips called seigneuries or fiefs along the banks of the St. Lawrence River, its estuaries, and other key transit features. This physical layout of manorial property developed as a means of maximizing ease of transit, commerce, and communication by using natural waterways (most notably, the St. Lawrence river) and the relatively few roads. A desirable plot had to be directly bordering or in very close proximity to a river system, which limited plot-expansion to one of two directions—either left or right.

Despite the official arrangement reached between Cardinal Richelieu and the Company of One Hundred Associates, levels of migration to French colonies in North America remained extremely low. The resulting scarcity of labour had a profound effect on the system of land distribution and the habitant-seigneurial relationship that emerged in New France.

King Louis XIV instituted a condition on the land, stating that it could be forfeited unless it was cleared within a certain period of time. This condition kept the land from being sold by the seigneur, leading instead to its being sub-granted to peasant farmers, the habitants.

When a habitant was granted the title deed to a lot, he had to agree to accept a variety of annual charges and restrictions. Rent was the most important of these and could be set in money, produce or labour. Once this rent was set, it could not be altered, neither due to inflation nor time. A habitant was essentially free to develop his land as he wished, with only a few obligations to his seigneur. Likewise, a seigneur did not have many responsibilities towards his habitants. The seigneur was obligated to build a gristmill for his tenants, and they in turn were required to grind their grain there and provide the seigneur with one sack of flour out of every 14. The seigneur also had the right to a specific number of days of forced labour by the habitants and could claim rights over fishing, timber and common pastures.

Though the demands of the seigneurs became more significant at the end of French rule, they could never obtain enough resources from the rents and fees imposed on the habitants alone to become truly wealthy, nor leave their tenants in poverty. Habitants were free individuals; seigneurs simply owned a "bundle of specific and limited rights over productive activity within that territory". The seigneur–habitant relationship was one where both parties were owners of the land, who split the attributes of ownership between them.

== Geographic characteristics ==
Estates in free socage were the most macro-level of land division in New France but, within them, there existed several tenurial subdivisions. Immediately below the level of free socage was that of the villeinage (roture). Throughout New France, several thousand estates in villeinage were developed. Furthermore, these villein tenancies were remarkably uniform in terms of size. Barring extreme cases, it is estimated that around 95% of all villein estates were between 40 and 200 arpents (14 and 68 ha; 34 and 169 acres) in size, though most were likely 120 arpents or less. Estates of less than 40 square arpents were considered to be of little value by villein socagers.

To maximize simplicity when surveying, estates in villein socage were almost invariably distributed in rectangular plots following a rowed system, wherein the first row bordered the river, and was the first to be filled, followed by the second behind it and so on. Typically, the proportions of such rectangles coincided with the ratio of 1:10 for width and length, respectively. However, extremes all the way up to 1:100 are known to have occurred. This method of land division confers obvious advantages in terms of easy access to transportation and cheap surveying, but also allowed socagers to live remarkably close to families on neighboring plots—often within a few hundred yards—creating something of a proto-neighborhood.

Although legislation and enforcement varied depending on the period and administration, a socager's rights of entitlement to their villeinage could not be revoked as long as they paid their duties and fees to the lord of the manor and satisfied the requirements of tenir feu et lieu. This stipulated that they were obliged to improve their landholdings or these would be confiscated. By ordinance of the Intendant in 1682, a socager could not hold more than two villeinages.

== Types of tenure ==
The lord of the manor rented most of the land to tenants, known as censitaires or habitants, who cleared the land, built houses and other buildings, and farmed the land. A smaller portion of the land was kept as a demesne (land owned by the manorial lord and farmed by his family or by hired labour) which was economically significant in the early days of settlement, though less thereafter. Manorial land tenure in New France differed somewhat from its counterpart in France; the manorial lords of New France were not always nobles, though many were. Fiefs in North America were granted to military officers and – as in France – many were owned by the Catholic clergy. However, the system was feudal in the sense that there was a clear displacement of wealth happening from tenants to their landlords, which was not at all based on market forces (as land was plentiful and labor was not), but rather a system institutionalized by the crown.

Forms of feudal tenure
Type	Description
noble allod en franc aleu noble	A type of freehold estate in land which, if held by an individual, conferred the status of nobility. Such lands were given without any consideration other than rendering fealty and homage. Only two allodial grants were made in New France, both to the Jesuit Order.
allod en franc aleu roturier	Similar to en franc aleu noble, without conferring nobility. This freehold estate was exempt from all burdens and subject to no feudal rights or incidents of any kind.
frankalmoin en franche aumône	Granted to religious, educational or charitable institutions. In addition to rendering fealty and homage, tenants were bound to perform specified services in return for the grant.
fief, free socage en fief (also called en seigneurie)	The form under which fiefs were created. It was subject to certain conditions: 1. The free socager, as a crown vassal, must render fealty and homage to the King through his representative.; 2. Within 40 days of taking possession of the fief, the socager must deposit an aveu et dénombrement (i.e., a map and detailed description).; 3. For those fiefs created after 1711, the obligation to subinfeudate, which effectively forced the socager to bring settlers into New France.; 4. The obligation to pay the quint (i.e., a conveyance fee based on the property's value) to the Crown.; 5. The obligation of military service.
sub-fief en arrière-fief	Where a vassal chose to subdivide his fief into smaller units (= subinfeudation). A subtenant (or subinfeudatory) owed his obligations to a vassal instead of directly to the Crown.
villeinage, villein socage en censive or en roture	The type of tenancy held by a socager in return for paying certain duties to the lord. Villein socagers were referred to as censitaires. The dues were of various natures: 1. Cens et rentes (feu-duties): annual duties paid to the lord of the manor on St. Martin's Day (November 11). Cens were nominal amounts, while rentes were specified at the time of feoffment, and could be in either produce or money.; 2. Lods et ventes (entry fine): payable to the lord upon the sale of the land, being set at one-twelfth of its value.; 3. Droits de banalité (astrictions): various obligations for censitaires to use the manor mill and oven, where such were provided.; 4. Corvée: days of free labour that the villein socager was obliged to perform for the lord.

Villein socagers were able to divide their land for their children according to the Custom of Paris once they had families of their own, meaning that in the event of the death of a spouse, half the estate went to the surviving spouse, with the other half divided among the children (both male and female). This could lead to an unusual (for the time period) number of women, generally widows, who were in charge of large amounts of property. However, it is also worth noting that most widows remarried within a short time of their spouse's death and often the meticulous splitting of estates demanded by the Custom of Paris was disregarded in favor of quickly solidifying the new union.

In order to preserve each of the heirs' access to the river or road, the land would be divided lengthwise, resulting in narrower and narrower lots. In response to these increasingly subdivided farm plots and the issues of diminishing agricultural productivity associated with them, the Governor and the Intendant of New France petitioned the King in 1744 to issue a new ordinance rectifying the matter. The King responded by requiring the minimum plot size which a villein socager might cultivate or reside to be one arpent and a half of frontage by 30–40 arpents in depth. A final characteristic of villeinage is that the size of the fief typically varied in direct proportion with its distance from the nearest town, while its population density varied inversely.

Elsewhere this kind of property inheritance law often led to fragmentation of estates. However, the subsistence level farming of many of the villein socagers in New France made fragmentation impossible and so it was common practice for one heir to buy out the others' land, keeping estates in more or less one piece. It is also worth noting that anything but direct inheritance meant the property might be subject to the entry fine of 1/12th of the value of the property due to the lord.

=== Economic impact on New France ===
Some historians suggest that the structure of feudal land tenure itself might have caused delays in economic growth for New France. Morris Altman, for example, argued that by shifting disposable wealth and therefore spending power from the villein socagers to the manorial lords (crown vassals), the system deeply altered the economy of New France. Furthermore, since the manorial lords rarely had their estates as their chief source of income, the relatively insignificant sums of money from the feu-duties were used largely in the purchase of luxury items which were almost always imported from France. Altman theorizes that since the villein socagers would have either re-invested this money or bought goods produced locally, this limited growth and was damaging to the economy of New France. Though Altman later altered the precise estimates he made (based on annual outputs) of how much disposable income the socagers might have been deprived of (and therefore the amount of local investment lost), he confirmed his original thesis that the feudal fees reduced growth through wealth transfer. Other historians such as Allan Greer have also argued that the wealth transfer limited the growth of the villein socagers' farms as well as other local enterprises, which in the long run might limit general economic growth.

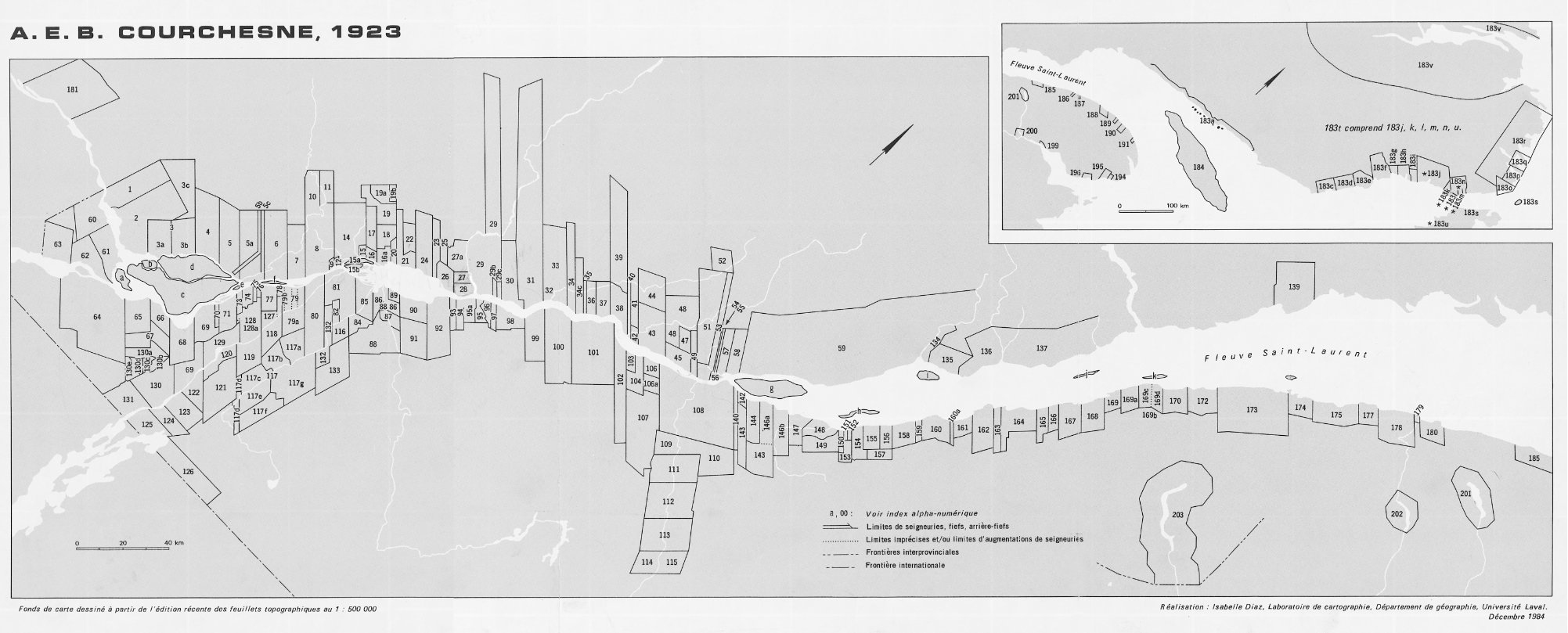
Boundaries of fiefs, including sub-fiefs, in Lower Canada (as charted in 1923)

== After the British conquest ==
After the Battle of the Plains of Abraham and the conquest of Quebec by the British during the Seven Years' War, the system became an obstacle to colonization by British settlers, not least because England had already abolished feudal land tenure under the Tenures Abolition Act 1660. Nevertheless, the Quebec Act of 1774 retained French civil law and therefore the manorial system.

Manorial land tenure remained relatively intact for almost a century. This was the prime land; also many Englishmen and Scotsmen purchased manorial estates; others were divided equally between male and female offspring; some were run by the widows of manorial lords as their children grew to adulthood. Over time land became subdivided among the owners' offspring and descendants, resulting in increasingly narrow plots of land.

When Quebec was divided in December 1791 between Lower Canada (today's Quebec) and Upper Canada (today's Ontario), a 45.7 km (28.4 mi) segment of the colonial boundary was drawn at the west edge of the westernmost contiguous manorial estates along the St. Lawrence and Ottawa rivers, accounting for the small triangle of land at Vaudreuil-Soulanges that belongs to Quebec rather than Ontario. Only two outlying feudal manors were ever established in the area that became Upper Canada, being located at L'Orignal on the Ottawa River and Cataraqui at the eastern end of Lake Ontario at what is now Kingston and Wolfe Island. Tenure in the Upper Canada manors was converted into fee simple (freehold) under the Constitutional Act 1791.

== Abolition ==
The British Parliament passed legislation in 1825 that provided for the commutation of manorial land tenure, upon the agreement of the lord of the manor and the tenants concerned. As no incentives were given, few such conversions took place. The Province of Canada also attempted to facilitate the process through passage of a further Act in 1845.

The manorial system was formally abolished through the passage of the Feudal Abolition Act 1854 by the Parliament of the Province of Canada, which received royal assent on December 18, 1854. It provided for:

- the conversion of all feudal tenure into that of allodial title
- the abolition of all feu-duties and feudal incidents, to be replaced by a rentcharge (rente constituée) calculated under a specified formula
- the determination of rights held by manorial lords and tenants through referral to a special Seigniorial Court
- the redemption of rentcharges in certain circumstances, upon payment of a determined amount to the lord

After the required schedules for each manorial estate were published in 1859, the Parliament passed The Seigniorial Amendment Act of 1859, which provided for the commutation of all feu-duties and rents (other than those relating to cens et rentes) through payments to the lords from a fund appropriated for that purpose.

=== Delay into the 20th century for commutation of rents ===
Some of the vestiges of this system of landowning continued into the 20th century as some of the rentcharges continued to be collected as before on the traditional date of St. Martin's Day.

The final steps towards actual abolition of the system of rentcharges took place under the government of Louis-Alexandre Taschereau, when the cause was promoted by Télesphore-Damien Bouchard, the Liberal deputy and mayor of Saint-Hyacinthe. He declared that "a very large number of villein socagers have not yet redeemed for over the seventy years that they have been able to do so [since the passage of the 1854 law]" and they must "make an annual pilgrimage to pay [the dues], very often, to a stranger who has acquired rights originally belonging to our ancestral families".

In 1928, the Seigniories Act was amended to require the compilation of all information relating to dues and related capital by municipality. In 1935, the Legislature of Quebec passed the Seigniorial Rent Abolition Act, which aimed to "facilitate the freeing of all lands or lots of land from rentcharges." It provided for:

- the incorporation of all county municipalities and independent city and town municipalities in which manorial estates were located, as the Syndicat national du rachat des rentes seigneuriales (SNRRS) (English: National Syndicate for the Redemption of Rentcharges).
- the borrowing of money by the Syndicate, under provincial guarantee, in order to redeem all rentcharges.
- the preparation of land registers (terriers) in each municipality showing the lands, owners, rents and capital amounts concerned.
- the commutation of such rentcharges, upon the approval of the land registers by the municipal councils and their subsequent ratification by an Act of the Legislature, after which the funds borrowed by the Syndicate would be repaid through a special tax to be collected from the owners, which could be paid in a lump sum or over a period of up to 41 years.

=== Final steps (1936–1970) ===
It was contemplated that the manorial lords would receive their commutation payments by November 11, 1936, in consideration of the capital represented by the feu-duties to be collected. However, the work of the SNRRS was briefly on hiatus from 1936 to 1940 during the government of the Union Nationale. It was resumed by the new provincial Liberal government in 1940, after which the final feu-duties were paid in November 1940.

Compared to the situation of the short cadastre (survey) of 1854, it was determined that annuities owed amount to no more than 25% of the original amount owed by the villein socagers overall. Some had not been paid since the 19th century. To rectify the situation for once and all, the SNRRS issued an edict dated September 15, 1940, stating that whatever was due no later than November 11 of that year was to be paid directly to the manorial lord as before. Any amount owing after that date would be paid to the municipality.

The amounts paid to the various municipalities were unequal as they did not directly correspond with the boundaries of the former manors. Many municipalities allowed a lump sum payment of the amount owing, rather than impose a small annual tax over the 41 years as permitted. The final installment paid to the SNRRS by the municipalities was made eleven years earlier than planned, on November 11, 1970, instead of November 11, 1981, due to an apparently effective management of the system.

== Historical evidence ==
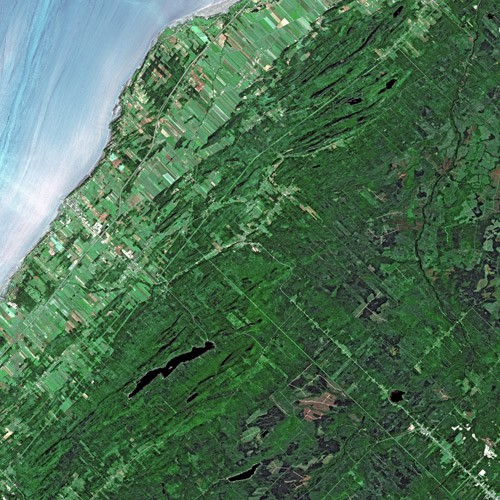
St. Lawrence River by SPOT Satellite. "Long lots" can be discerned at the riverside.

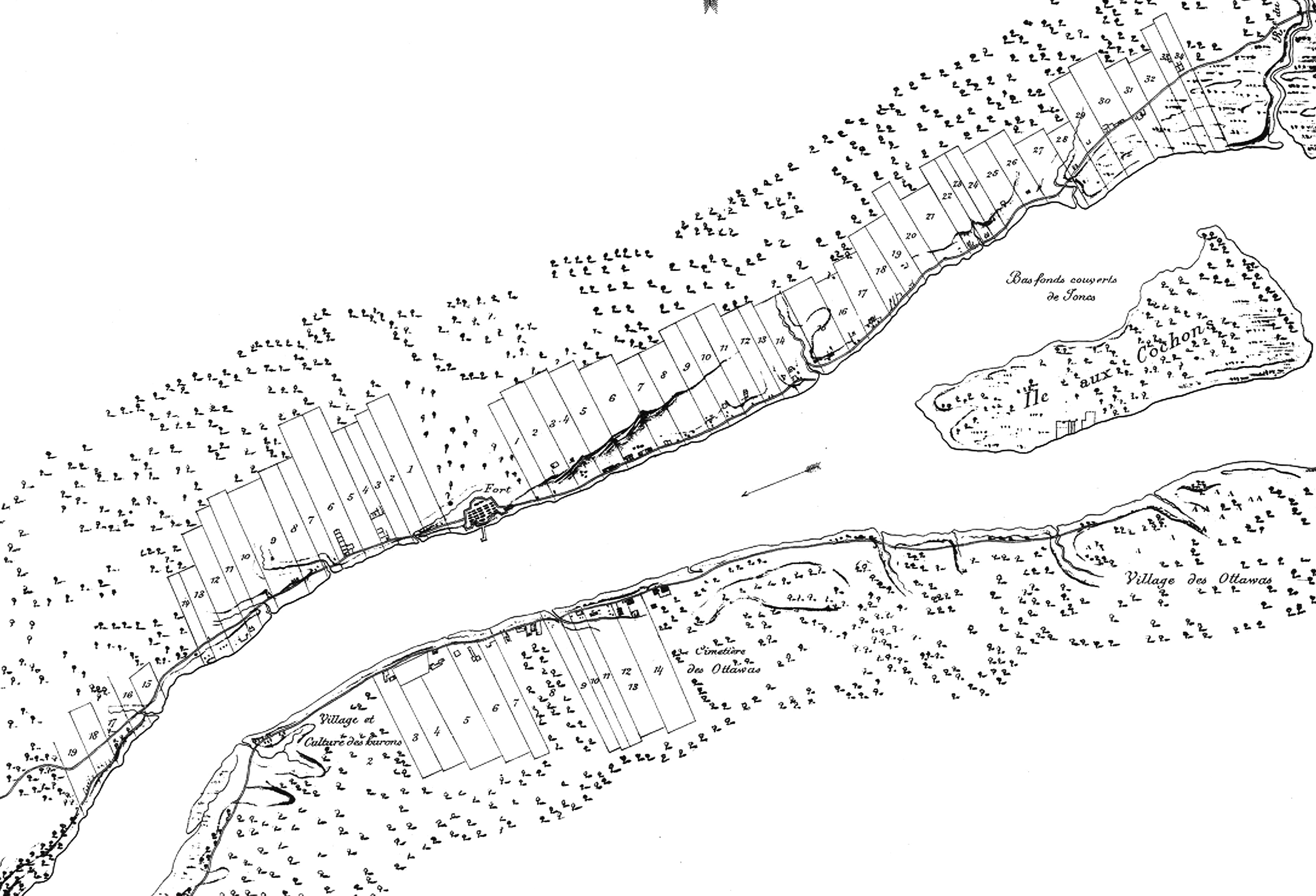
Ribbon farms along the Detroit River in 1796, where modern Detroit and Windsor, Ontario now stand. Fort Detroit is on the north side of the river at center left, and Belle Isle is to the right.

Ribbon farms along the River Raisin in Michigan can be seen in this 1859 map, with one township boundary is perpendicular to the river.

Remnants of the manorial system can be seen today in maps and satellite imagery of Quebec, with the characteristic "long lot" or "river lot" land system still forming the basic shape of current farm fields and clearings, as well as being reflected in the historic county boundaries along the St. Lawrence River. This form of land use can also be seen in images of Louisiana, which also was founded as a French colony with somewhat similar agricultural patterns. Also, this form of land use can be seen along the Red River in southern Manitoba and along certain portions of the South Saskatchewan River in Saskatchewan near Batoche, where significant Metis and French-Canadian settlement occurred. It was also the pattern in the Illinois Country developed by the French east of the Mississippi River, as in Prairie du Rocher, Illinois.

This system is also visible in the streets of Detroit, Michigan. The earliest streets were named after the owners of each farm, such as Livernois being named after the Livernois Family ribbon farm. In Monroe County, Michigan, land on the River Raisin just west of Monroe, 35 mi (56.33 km) southwest of Detroit, also clearly shows the seigneurial system of land tenure. Three townships, Monroe. Frenchtown, and Raisinville, are unique in Michigan, as having a boundary that does not align with a longitude, but instead is perpendicular to the River Raisin, and aligns with the, still existent, seigneurial system land boundaries. Vestiges of this system are seen in the payment of land tax. The seigneurial system landowners pay on December 31 for the year just over, while the rest of Michigan pays on January 1 for the year to come.

Vestiges of the former system still emerge from time to time. In February 2005, the Superior Court of Quebec issued an order cancelling mortgages that could still exist for feu-duties on a property that was once part of Beauport Manor, Four years later there was an announcement that a wind farm, consisting of 131 wind turbines, was to be developed there. In September 2014, the Quebec Court of Appeal upheld a Superior Court ruling that private ownership of the bed of a lake and related fishing rights were not conferred by the terms of a 1674 deed of feoffment creating the Manor of La Petite-Nation.

The work of the SNRRS can be evaluated by reviewing the fonds given in 1975 by the Ministry of Municipal Affairs (which looked after the SNRRS) to the Bibliothèque et Archives nationales du Québec. These documents constitute an amount equal to 20.5 meters of textual records.

A comparable manorial system was the patroon system of heritable land established by the Dutch West India Company. The company granted feudal powers to the "patroons", who paid for the transport of settlers in New Netherland. The system was not abolished by the British when they took possession of the Dutch holdings.

== See also ==
- Fee (feudal tenure)
- French nobility
- List of Seigneuries of New France
- List of seignories of Quebec
- Ribbon farm
- Seignory
- History of agriculture in Canada
- New France
