= Acadian Civil War =

Civil war in New France

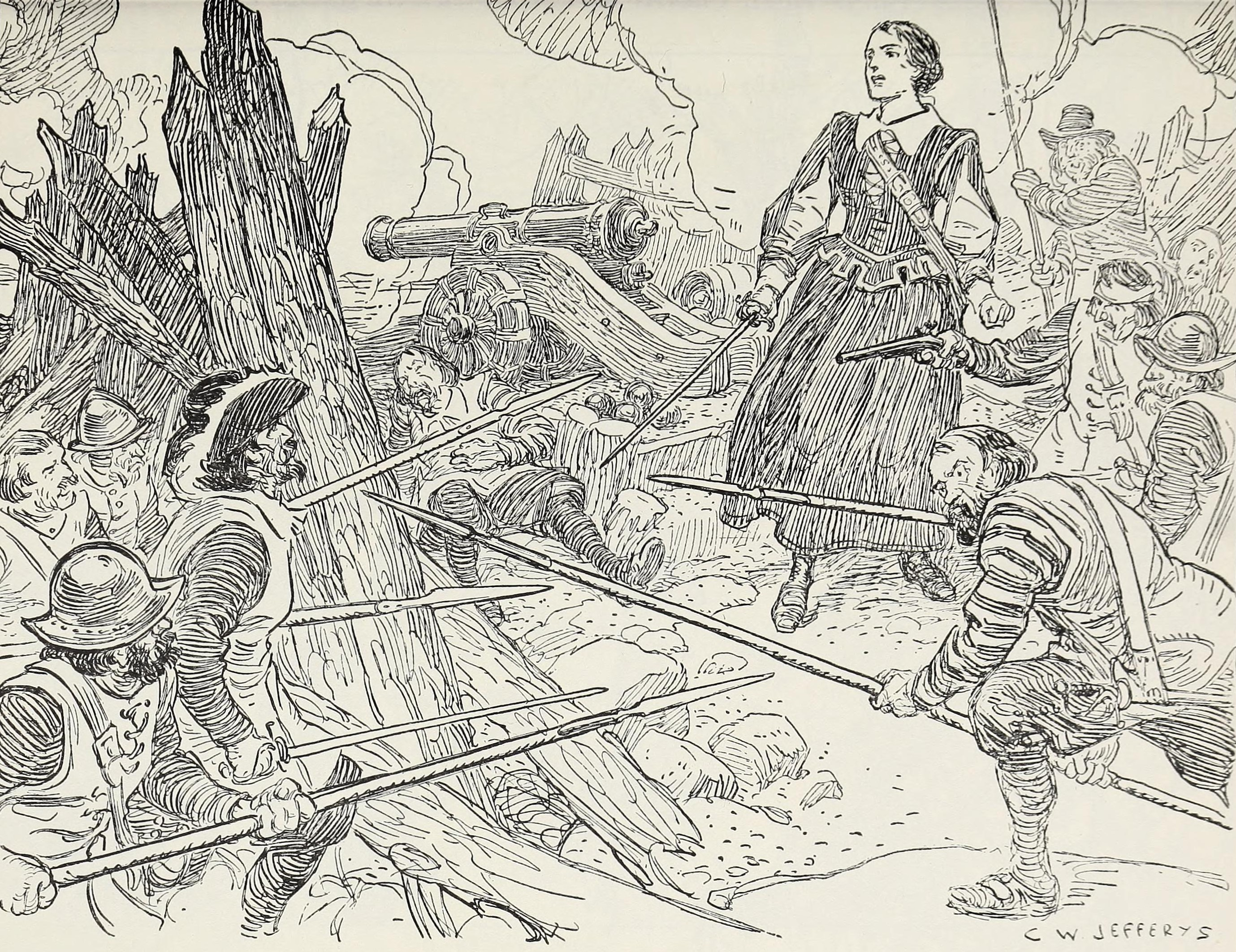
- Siege of Saint John (1645) – d'Aulnay defeats La Tour in Acadia
Date	1635–1654
Location	Acadia
Result	Port Royal temporary victory: La Tour expelled by d'Aulnay; La Tour later marries d'Aulnay's widow Jeanne Motin & resumes Governorship

Belligerents
St. John Administration; Supported by: Massachusetts Bay Colony	Port Royal Administration; Supported by: Catholic Church

Commanders and leaders
Charles de Saint-Étienne de la Tour; Françoise-Marie Jacquelin	Charles de Menou d'Aulnay

Strength
Several hundred	Several hundred

Casualties and losses
Execution of St. Johns garrison	

The Acadian Civil War (1635–1654) was fought between competing governors of the French province of Acadia. Governor Charles de Saint-Étienne de la Tour (a Protestant) had been granted one area of territory by King Louis XIV, and Charles de Menou d'Aulnay (a Catholic) had been granted another area. The divisions made by the king were geographically uninformed, and the two territories and their administrative centres overlapped. The conflict was intensified by personal animosity between the two governors, and came to an end when d'Aulnay successfully expelled la Tour from his holdings. D'Aulnay's success was effectively overturned after his death when la Tour married d'Aulnay's widow in 1653.

== Historical context ==
In 1635, Governor of Acadia Charles de Menou d'Aulnay de Charnisay moved settlers from present-day LaHave, Nova Scotia to Port-Royal, and the Acadian people began to establish their roots. Under d'Aulnay, the Acadians built the first dykes in North America and cultivated the reclaimed salt marshes.

During this time, Acadia was plunged into what some historians have described as a civil war; the two main centres were Port-Royal (present day Annapolis Royal), where d'Aulnay was stationed, and present-day Saint John, New Brunswick, where Charles de Saint-Étienne de la Tour was stationed.

In an effort to defend Acadia, Castine was founded in the winter of 1613, when Claude de Saint-Etienne de la Tour established a small trading post. In 1625, Charles de Saint-Étienne de la Tour erected a fort named Fort Pentagouët. After the English had captured the fort, in 1635, Governor Isaac de Razilly of Acadia sent Charles de Menou d'Aulnay de Charnisay to retake the village. In 1638, d'Aulnay built a more substantial fort named Fort Saint-Pierre. While he had other ventures in Acadia, Fort Pentagoet was his major outpost on the frontier with New England.

The strategic location at the mouth of the Saint John River was fortified by Charles de la Tour in 1631. The fort was named Fort Sainte-Marie (AKA Fort La Tour) and was located on the east side of the river. Both La Tour and d'Aulnay had claims of some legitimacy to the governorship of Acadia because the French Imperial officials made their appointments with an incomplete understanding of the geography of the area. La Tour had a fortified settlement at the mouth of the Saint John River while d'Aulnay's base was at Port Royal some 45 miles across the Bay of Fundy. In adjoining New England, the people supported La Tour's claim since he allowed them to fish and lumber in and along the Bay of Fundy without let or hindrance while d'Aulnay aggressively sought payment for that right. Word came to La Tour that d'Aulnay was concentrating men and materials for an attack on La Tour's fort and fur-trading operation at the mouth of the Saint John River. La Tour went to Boston to ask John Winthrop, the governor of Massachusetts Bay colony, for help. Winthrop arranged for several merchants to advance loans unofficially to La Tour for his purchase of men and material to defend the Saint John River fort from d'Aulnay's attack.

== War ==
=== Battle of Port Royal (1640) ===
La Tour arrived from present-day Saint John and attacked Port-Royal (Annapolis Royal) with two armed ships. D'Aulnay's captain was killed, while La Tour and his men were forced to surrender. In response to the attack, d'Aulnay sailed out of Port-Royal to establish a blockade of La Tour's fort at present-day Saint John.

=== Blockade of St. John (1642) ===
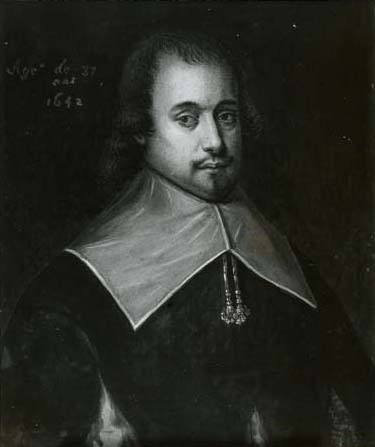
Charles de Menou d'Aulnay (19th century portrait, probably a copy of a 1642 portrait)

For five months, the Governor of Acadia d'Aulnay, who was stationed at Port Royal, created a blockade of the river to defeat La Tour at his fort. On 14 July 1643, La Tour arrived from Boston with four ships and a complement of 270 men to repossess Fort Sainte-Marie. After this victory, La Tour went on to attack d'Aulnay at Port Royal, Nova Scotia. LaTour was unsuccessful then in catching d'Aulnay and the rivalry continued for several more years.

=== Battle of Penobscot (1643) ===
After the blockade of St. John, d'Aulney was pursued by la Tour to Penobscot Bay, where d'Aulney ran two of his ships and another smaller vessel aground in order to form an improvised blockade. A small engagement followed at a nearby mill, with both sides suffering three casualties. La Tour's company proceeded to Boston, with a small vessel containing an abundance of moose and beaver skins.

=== Battle of Port-Royal (1643) ===
In 1643 La Tour tried to capture Port-Royal again. La Tour arrived at Saint John from Boston with a fleet of five armed vessels and 270 men and broke the blockade. La Tour then chased d'Aulnay's vessels back across the Bay of Fundy to Port-Royal (Annapolis Royal). D'Aulnay resisted the attack, and seven of his men were wounded and three killed. La Tour did not attack the fort, which was defended by twenty soldiers. La Tour burned the mill, killed the livestock and seized furs, gunpowder and other supplies.

=== St.Nick (1645) ===
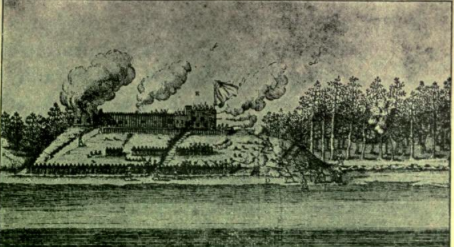
Siege of St. John (1645), "Attacking the fort'

While La Tour was in Boston, on Easter Sunday 13 April 1645, d'Aulnay sailed across the Bay of Fundy and arrived at La Tour's fort with a force of two hundred men. La Tour's soldiers were led by his wife, Françoise-Marie Jacquelin, who became known as the Lioness of LaTour for her valiant defence of the fort. After a five-day battle, on 18 April, d'Aulnay offered quarter to all if Françoise-Marie would surrender the fort. On that basis, knowing she was badly outnumbered, she capitulated, and d'Aulnay had captured La Tour's Fort Sainte-Marie. D'Aulnay then reneged on his pledge of safety for the defenders and hanged the La Tour garrison, forcing Madame de la Tour to watch with a rope around her neck. Three weeks later, while still in d'Aulnay's hands, she died. With the death of his wife and the loss of his fort, La Tour took refuge in Quebec and did not return to Acadia for the next four years, until after d'Aulnay had died in 1650.

== Afterward ==
After defeating La Tour at Saint John, from the capital Port-Royal (Annapolis Royal), d'Aulnay administered posts at LaHave, Nova Scotia; Pentagouet (Castine, Maine); Canso, Nova Scotia; Cap Sable (Port La Tour, Nova Scotia); the Saint John River (Bay of Fundy) and Miscou Island. He died in 1650, opening the governorship of Acadia, and prompting La Tour to return. He married d'Aulnay's widow Jeanne Motin 1653, ending the rivalry. The couple would have five children, and hundreds of their descendants live in the Canadian Maritimes today.

However, during the English Invasion of Acadia (1654), Colonel Robert Sedgwick, led hundreds of New England Confederation volunteers and two hundred of Oliver Cromwell's soldiers, captured and plundered La Tour's fort on the Saint John River and took him prisoner. This was preparatory to the capture of Port Royal, Acadia.

== Legacy ==
- John Greenleaf Whittier "St. John, 1647"
- Francis Joseph Sherman An Acadian Easter. Atlantic Monthly. April 1900.
