= Jeanne Motin =

Jeanne Motin (also spelled Mottin; c. 1615 – c. 1666) was an Acadian settler. Born in France, Motin arrived in Acadia in 1636 and married governor Charles de Menou d'Aulnay. The couple lived at Port-Royal and had eight children.

d'Aulnay had a contentious political rivalry with Charles La Tour, against whom he waged the Acadian Civil War. Although d'Aulnay was eventually successful in ousting La Tour from the colony, the hostilities and the expenses of governing resulted in significant debt. When d'Aulnay died in a canoe accident in 1650, his children were placed in the guardianship of his father, but Motin was pursued by creditors against his estate. Port-Royal was raided and looted. La Tour returned to Acadia after d'Aulnay's death and became governor. Motin married him on 24 February 1653; they had five children.
