= Charles de Menou d'Aulnay =

Governor of Acadia and Seigneur of Port Royal

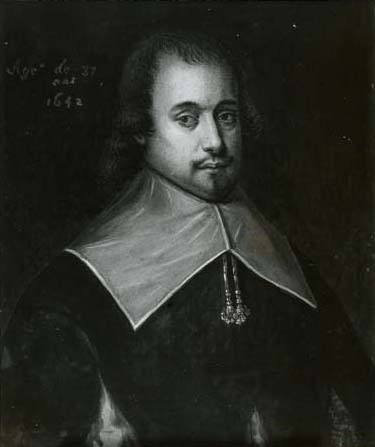

Governor of Acadia
- In office 1635–1650

Personal details
- Born: c. 1604 Château de Charnizay, Indre-et-Loire, France
- Died: 1650
- Spouse: Jeanne Motin

Military service
- Branch/service: French Navy

Charles de Menou d'Aulnay (de Charnisay) (c. 1604–1650) was a French pioneer of European settlement in North America and Governor of Acadia (1635–1650).

D'Aulnay was a member of the French nobility who was at various times a sea captain, a lieutenant in the French navy (under leadership of his cousin Isaac de Razilly), and Governor of Acadia (now primarily Nova Scotia and New Brunswick, Canada).

== Biography ==
D'Aulnay was born at Château de Charnizay, Touraine, France. His father was a high-ranking official for Louis XIII.

He came to serve as assistant to the governors and eventually lieutenant governor of Acadia.

== Acadia under Razilly ==
In 1632, Isaac de Razilly became governor of Acadia, having been selected by the government to restore to France her Acadian possessions. D'Aulnay, serving as one of the governor's able assistants, helped to borrow funds, hire ships, and recruit men for the regular ocean crossings to and from France for the Compagnie des Cent-Associés and a private company, Razilly-Condonnier.

These companies had divergent interests at times which resulted in costly competition. Razilly brought with him forty families and settled at La Hève (near present-day Lunenburg, Nova Scotia) on the southern coast of the island, dispossessing a Scotsman.

In 1635, Razilly re-established French control of Fort Pentagouet at Majabigwaduce on the Penobscot Bay, which had been given to France in an earlier Treaty with the English. He gave the Plymouth men that had charge of the fort their liberty, but bade them tell their people at the English plantations that he would come the next year and displace them as far south as the 40th degree of north latitude. He then took full possession of the place, and strengthened the defences. Plymouth people manned a vessel and went to Penobscot to drive out the French, whom they found only 18 in number, but strongly intrenched. D'Aulnay permitted them to expend all their ammunition, and then go home.

== Lieutenant of Acadia ==
Isaac de Razilly died in 1635 and the King appointed his brother, Claude de Launay-Razilly as the new governor. Claude did not come to Acadia but appointed d'Aulnay as his lieutenant to govern on his behalf and run the company, Razilly-Condonnier, in Acadia while he ran the operation in France. D'Aulnay went immediately to Port Royal, erected a new fort, moved the La Hève colonists, and sent to France for 20 additional families, making Port Royal the principal settlement in Acadia.

=== Battles against La Tour ===
At the mouth of the Saint John River was a fort commanded by Charles La Tour who held a commission precisely similar to d'Aulnay's. Accusations and complaints were proffered, and d'Aulnay, by reason of superior advantages at court, obtained an order from the king, 13 February 1641, for arresting La Tour and sending him to France. Because the military forces of the two rivals were almost equal, d'Aulnay could not dispossess La Tour, and was obliged to send back the ship that brought the order with La Tour's refusal instead of his body.

In the early winter of 1641, d'Aulnay returned to France to obtain additional power, and meanwhile La Tour sought the aid of his New England neighbours. As a result of negotiations with the New England governor, a body of Boston merchants made a visit to Fort La Tour for purposes of trade, and while at sea, on their return, met d'Aulnay himself, who informed them that La Tour was a rebel, and showed them a confirmation of the order issued the year before for his arrest. With 500 men in armed ships, d'Aulnay laid siege to Fort La Tour; but aid came from New England, and he was driven away.

In 1645, learning that La Tour had taken a journey to Quebec, d'Aulnay again laid siege to the fort; but Madame La Tour directed from the bastions the cannonade on the enemy's ships, and compelled d'Aulnay to retire. By the aid of a treacherous sentry, he was enabled, on his third attack, to enter the fort, but the resistance led by Madame La Tour was so fierce that he proposed terms of capitulation, pledging life and liberty to all in the garrison. His terms being accepted, he broke his agreement, hanged every member of the garrison, and compelled Madame La Tour to witness the execution with a rope around her own neck. She died a few weeks later, while her husband took refuge in Quebec.

=== Acadia Leadership ===
D'Aulnay now had the whole of Acadia to himself, and improvements were made, marshes were diked, mills erected, and ship building begun. In 1645 he went to France, and received honours from the king. In 1647 a commission was issued making him governor and lieutenant-general in Acadia. However, he would not have a long time to enjoy his triumph, as in 1650 he died following a boating accident, throwing the title of Acadia again into question.

== Legacy ==
La Tour, upon d'Aulnay's death, sailed for France, laid the facts before the court, and not only secured a restoration of his title and privileges, but was made d'Aulnay's successor of Acadia.

D'Aulnay's widow Jeanne Motin, with her children, was still living in Acadia, and was alarmed at the turn affairs had taken, but with time hostility settled. D'Aulnay's widow and La Tour concluded to end their troubles, and were married on 24 February 1653.

Because of his commitment to colonization, d'Aulnay's death left a thriving colony in Acadia. He is recognized as an important pioneer of European settlement in North America.

== See also ==
- History of the Acadians
- Military history of Nova Scotia
- English Invasion of Acadia (1654)
