= History of Maine =

The history of the area comprising the U.S. state of Maine spans thousands of years, measured from the earliest human settlement, or approximately two hundred, measured from the advent of U.S. statehood in 1820. The present article will concentrate on the period of European contact and after.

== Etymology ==
The origin of the name Maine is unclear. One theory is that it was named after the French province of Maine. Another is that it derives from a practical nautical term, "the main" or "Main Land", "Meyne" or "Mainland", which served to distinguish the bulk of the state from its numerous islands. Whatever the origin, the name was fixed for English settlers in 1665 when the English King's Commissioners ordered that the "Province of Maine" be entered from then on in official records. The state legislature in 2001 adopted a resolution establishing Franco-American Day, which stated that the state was named after the former French province of Maine.

Other theories mention earlier places with similar names or claim it is a nautical reference to the mainland. Captain John Smith, in his "Description of New England" (1614) laments the lack of exploration: "Thus you may see, of this 2000. miles more then halfe is yet vnknowne to any purpose: no not so much as the borders of the Sea are yet certainly discouered. As for the goodnes and true substances of the Land, wee are for most part yet altogether ignorant of them, vnlesse it bee those parts about the Bay of Chisapeack and Sagadahock: but onely here and there wee touched or haue seene a little the edges of those large dominions, which doe stretch themselues into the Maine, God doth know how many thousand miles;" Note that his description of the mainland of North America is "the Maine". The word "main" was a frequent shorthand for the word "mainland" (as in "The Spanish Main").

The first known record of the name appears in an August 10, 1622, land charter to Sir Ferdinando Gorges and Captain John Mason, English Royal Navy veterans, who were granted a large tract in present-day Maine that Mason and Gorges "intend to name the Province of Maine". Mason had served with the Royal Navy in the Orkney Islands, where the chief island is called Mainland, a possible name derivation for these English sailors. In 1623, the English naval captain Christopher Levett, exploring the New England coast, wrote: "The first place I set my foote upon in New England was the Isle of Shoals, being Ilands [sic] in the sea, above two Leagues from the Mayne." Initially, several tracts along the coast of New England were referred to as Main or Maine (cf. the Spanish Main). A reconfirmed and enhanced April 3, 1639, charter, from England's King Charles I, gave Sir Ferdinando Gorges increased powers over his new province and stated that it "shall forever hereafter, be called and named the PROVINCE OR COUNTIE OF MAINE, and not by any other name or names whatsoever ..." Maine is the only U.S. state whose name has only one syllable.

Attempts to uncover the history of the name of Maine began with James Sullivan's 1795 "History of the District of Maine." He made the unsubstantiated claim that the Province of Maine was a compliment to the queen of Charles I, Henrietta Maria, who once "owned" the Province of Maine in France. Maine historians quoted this until the 1845 biography of that queen by Agnes Strickland established that she had no connection to the province; further, King Charles I married Henrietta Maria in 1625, three years after the name Maine first appeared on the charter. A new theory put forward by Carol B. Smith Fisher in 2002 postulated that Sir Ferdinando Gorges chose the name in 1622 to honor the village where his ancestors first lived in England, rather than the province in France. "MAINE" appears in the Domesday Book of 1086 in reference to the county of Dorset, which is today Broadmayne, just southeast of Dorchester.

The view generally held among British place name scholars is that Mayne in Dorset is Brythonic, corresponding to modern Welsh "maen", plural "main" or "meini". Some early spellings are: MAINE 1086, MEINE 1200, MEINES 1204, MAYNE 1236. Today the village is known as Broadmayne, which is primitive Welsh or Brythonic, "main" meaning rock or stone, considered a reference to the many large sarsen stones still present around Little Mayne farm, half a mile northeast of Broadmayne village.

== Pre-European history ==
The earliest culture known to have inhabited Maine, from roughly 3000 BC to 1000 BC, were the Red Paint People, a maritime group known for elaborate burials using red ochre. They were followed by the Susquehanna culture, the first to use pottery.

By the time of European discovery, the inhabitants of Maine were the Algonquian-speaking Wabanaki peoples, including the Abenaki, Mi'kmaq, Maliseet, Passamaquoddy, and Penobscots.

== Colonial period ==
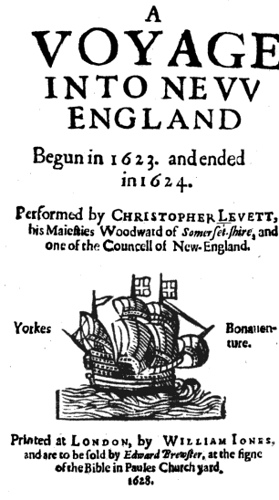
A Voyage into New England, written by Capt. Christopher Levett to spur interest in his Maine colony

There are many stories of Norsemen exploring as far south as Maine, but there is currently no documented evidence for that. In 1497 John Cabot made the first of two documented voyages to explore the New World on behalf of Henry VII of England and it's very likely one of the voyages reached as far south as the coast of Maine. Cabot's expeditions were based out of the port of Bristol, England, and Bristol merchant William Weston followed up on Cabot's efforts in 1499. Cabot's crews reported (as written in a letter to the Duke of Milan in 1497): "The Sea there is swarming with fish which can be taken not only with the net but in baskets with a stone, so that it sinks in the water." In fact, English fishermen had already been sailing to Iceland for cod fishing, and after Weston's return there is anecdotal evidence that Europeans from England to Portugal regularly fished the northeast waters, including the Gulf of Maine, immediately afterwards.

Following disputed rights over the northeast coasts between Spain and England the next documented Europeans to explore the coast of Maine were by Giovanni da Verrazzano under the French flag in 1524, and then the Portuguese explorer Estêvão Gomes, in service of the Spanish Empire, in 1525. They mapped the coastline (including the Penobscot River) but did not settle, though Verrazzano's efforts added a French claim to the area. The first European settlement in the area was made on St. Croix Island in 1604 by a French party that included Samuel de Champlain and Mathieu da Costa. The French named the area Acadia. French and English settlers would contest central Maine until the 1750s (when the French were defeated in the French and Indian War). The French developed and maintained strong relations with the local Indian tribes through Catholic missionaries.

English colonists sponsored by the Plymouth Company founded a settlement in Maine in 1607 (the Popham Colony at Phippsburg), but it was abandoned the following year. A French trading post was established at present-day Castine in 1613 by Claude de Saint-Étienne de la Tour, and may represent the first permanent European settlement in New England. The Plymouth Colony, established on the shores of Cape Cod Bay in 1620, set up a competing trading post at Penobscot Bay in the 1620s.

The territory between the Merrimack and Kennebec rivers was first called the Province of Maine in a 1622 land patent granted to Sir Ferdinando Gorges and John Mason. The two split the territory along the Piscataqua River in a 1629 pact that resulted in the Province of New Hampshire being formed by Mason in the south and New Somersetshire being created by Gorges to the north, in what is now southwestern Maine. The present Somerset County in Maine preserves this early nomenclature.

One of the first English attempts to settle the Maine coast was by Christopher Levett, an agent for Gorges and a member of the Plymouth Council for New England. After securing a royal grant for 6,000 acres (24 km^{2}) of land on the site of present-day Portland, Maine, Levett built a stone house and left a group of settlers behind when he returned to England in 1623 to drum up support for his settlement, which he called "York" after the city in England of his birth. Originally called Machigonne by the local Abenaki, later settlers named it Falmouth and it is known today as Portland. Levett's settlement, like the Popham Colony also failed, and the settlers Levett left behind were never heard from again. Levett did sail back across the Atlantic to meet with Massachusetts Bay Colony Governor John Winthrop at Salem in 1630, but died on the return voyage without ever returning to his settlement.

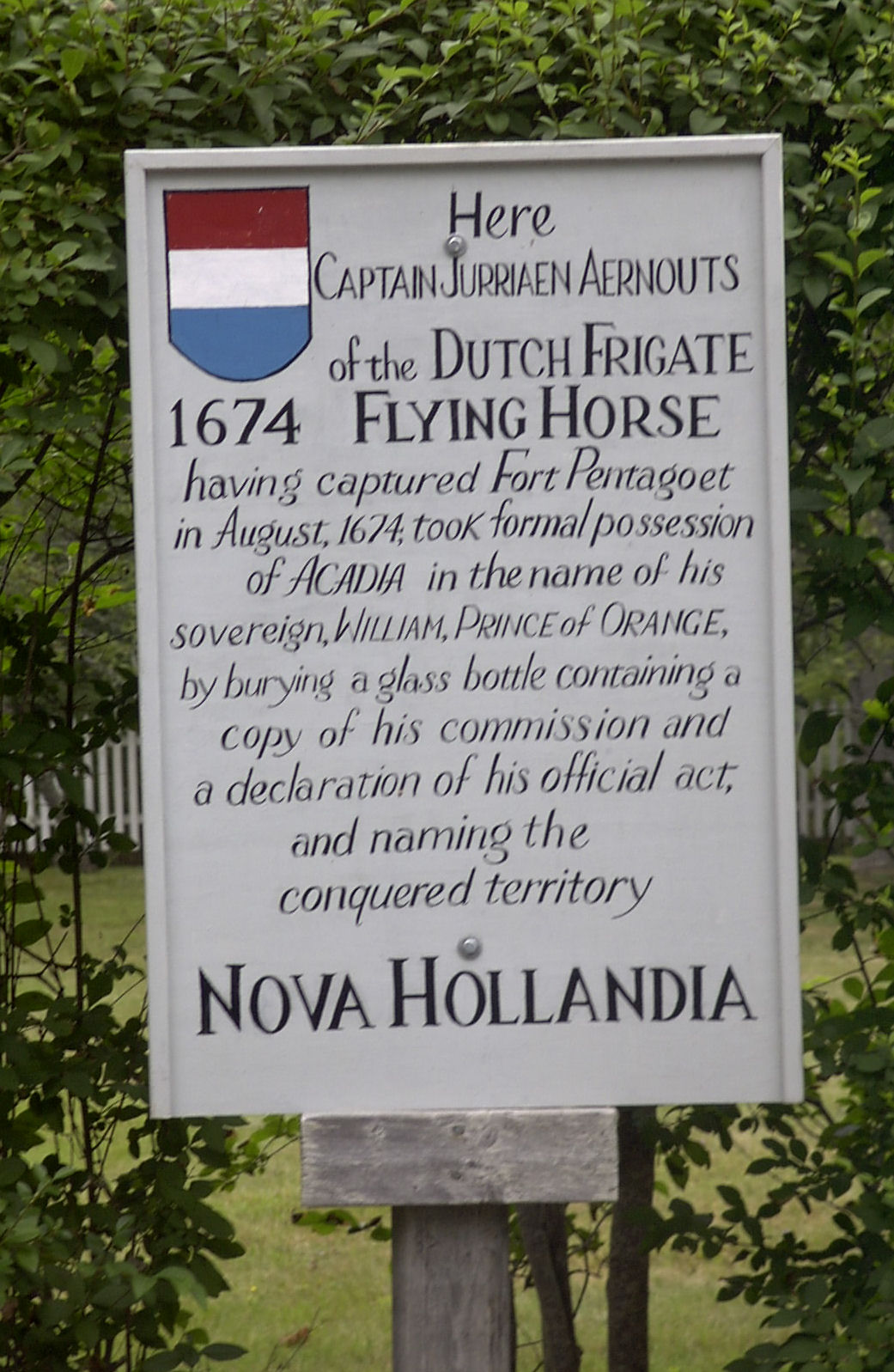
Marker commemorating the Dutch conquest of Acadia (1674), which they renamed New Holland. This is the spot where Jurriaen Aernoutsz buried a bottle at the capital of Acadia, Fort Pentagouet, Castine, Maine

The New Somersetshire colony was small, and in 1639 Gorges received a second patent, from Charles I, covering the same territory as Gorges' 1629 settlement with Mason. Gorges' second effort resulted in the establishment of more settlements along the coast of southern Maine, and along the Piscataqua River, with a formal government under his distant relation, Thomas Gorges. A dispute about the bounds of a 1630 land grant led in 1643 to the short-lived formation of Lygonia on territory that encompassed a large area of the Gorges grant (modern Portland, Scarborough and Saco).

The 1629 Charter of Massachusetts Bay set the northern sea-to-sea boundary three miles north of the northernmost part of the Merrimack River. After the parliamentary victory in the Wars of the Three Kingdoms and installation of the Puritan Oliver Cromwell, a 1652 survey by the Massachusetts reported the source of the Merrimack as Lake Winnipesaukee, and marked Endicott Rock as the boundary at three miles north of 43°40′12″N (which would put it at 43°43′12″N). Surveyors reckoned on the Maine coast this corresponded to Upper Clapboard Island in Casco Bay, just north of modern-day Portland, Maine. This meant Massachusetts' patent encompassed all the English colonial settlements in the Mason's lands (New Hampshire), and both Lygonia and Gorges' lands (western Maine, which ended around modern-day Bath, Maine). The Parliamentarian, Puritan colony of Massachusetts sent commissioners to the Anglican, Royalist colonies to enforce jurisdiction. Opponents were arrested and jailed until the leader of the resistance, Edward Godfrey, capitulated.

Both Gorges' Province of Maine and Lygonia had been absorbed into the Massachusetts Bay Colony by 1658. After the Stuart Restoration, the Royal Commission of 1664 established an independent Maine province. In 1668, Massachusetts sent a small military force led by John Leverett and Richard Waldron to reassert Boston control. Massachusetts claim would be overturned in 1676, but Massachusetts again asserted control by purchasing the territorial claims of the Gorges' heirs.

In 1669, the Territory of Sagadahock, between the Kennebec and St. Croix rivers (what is now eastern Maine) was granted by Charles II to his brother James, Duke of York. Under the terms of this grant, all the territory from the Saint Lawrence River to the Atlantic Ocean was constituted as Cornwall County, and was governed as part of the duke's proprietary Province of New York. At times, this territory was claimed by New France as part of Acadia.

In 1674, the Dutch briefly conquered Acadia, renaming the colony New Holland.

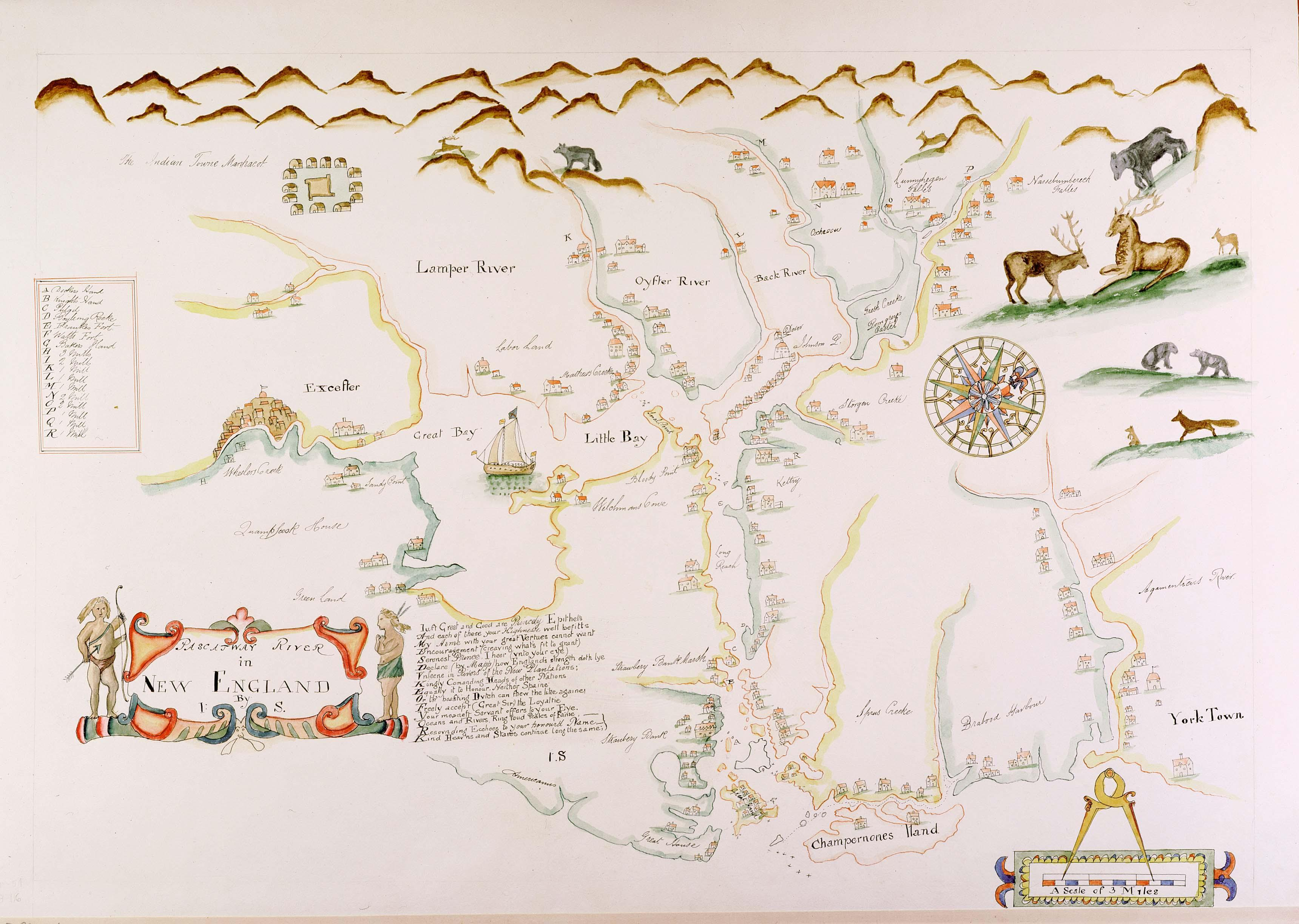
Copy of English map of the Piscataqua River; on the border of ME and NH, c. 1670

In 1686 James, now king, established the Dominion of New England. This political entity eventually combined all of the English colonial territories from Delaware Bay to the St. Croix River. The dominion collapsed in 1689, and a new patent was issued by William III of England and Mary II of England in 1691. This became effective in 1692 when the territory between the Piscataqua and the St. Croix (all of modern Maine) became part of the new Province of Massachusetts Bay as Yorkshire, a name which survives in present-day York County.

=== Eastern border wars ===
For English settlers, the east of the Kennebec River was known in the 17th century as the Territory of Sagadahock; however, the French included this area as part of Acadia. It was dominated by tribes of the Wabanaki Confederacy, which supported Acadia. The only significant European presence was at Fort Pentagouet, the French trading post first established in 1613 as well as missionaries on Kennebec River and the Penobscot River. Fort Pentagouet was briefly the capital of Acadia (1670–1674) in an effort to protect the French claim to the territory. There were four wars before the region was finally taken by English settlers in Father Rale's War.

In the first war, King Philips War, some of the tribes of the Wabanaki Confederacy participated and successfully prevented English colonial settlement in their territory. During the next war, King William's War, Baron St. Castin at Fort Pentagouet and French Jesuit missionary Sébastien Rale were notably active. Again, the Wabanaki Confederacy executed a successful campaign against the English settlers west of the Kennebec River. In 1696, the major defensive establishment in the territory, Fort William Henry at Pemaquid (present-day Bristol), was besieged by a French force. The territory was again on the front lines in Queen Anne's War (1702–1713), with the Northeast Coast Campaign.

The next and final conflict over the New England/ Acadia border was Father Rale's War. During the war, the Confederacy launched two campaigns against the British settlers west of the Kennebec (1723, 1724). Rale and numerous chiefs were killed by a New England force in 1724 at Norridgewock, which led to the collapse of French claims to Maine.

During King George's War, members of the Wabanaki Confederacy led three campaigns against the British settlers in Maine (1745, 1746, 1747).

During the final colonial war, the French and Indian War, members of the Confederacy again executed numerous raids into Maine from Acadia/ Nova Scotia. Acadian militia raided the British colonial settlements of Swan's Island, Maine and present-day Friendship, Maine and Thomaston, Maine. Francis Noble wrote her captivity narrative after being captured at Swan's Island. On June 9, 1758, Indians raided Woolwich, Maine, killing members of the Preble family and taking others prisoner to Quebec. This incident became known as the last conflict on the Kennebec River.

After the defeat of the French colony of Acadia, the territory from the Penobscot River east fell under the nominal authority of the Province of Nova Scotia, and together with present-day New Brunswick formed the Nova Scotia County of Sunbury, with its court of general sessions at Campobello Island.

=== Land sales ===
In the late 18th century, several tracts of land in Maine, then part of Massachusetts, were sold off by lottery. Two tracts of 1,000,000 acres (4,000 km^{2}), one in south-east Maine and another in the west, were bought by a wealthy Philadelphia banker, William Bingham. This land became known as the Bingham Purchase.

== American Revolution ==
Maine was a center of Patriotism during the American Revolution, with less Loyalist activity than most colonies. Merchants operated 52 ships that served as privateers attacking British supply ships. Machias in particular was a center for privateering and Patriot activity. In 1775, it was the site of an early naval engagement led by Jeremiah O'Brien that resulted in the capture of a small Royal Navy vessel, the Margaretta. Jonathan Eddy led a failed attempt to capture Fort Cumberland in Nova Scotia in 1776. In 1777 Eddy led the defense of Machias against a Royal Navy raid.

Captain Henry Mowat of the Royal Navy had charge of operations off the Maine coast during much the war. He dismantled Fort Pownall at the mouth of the Penobscot River and burned Falmouth in 1775 (present-day Portland). His reputation in Maine traditions is heartless and brutal, but historians note that he performed his duty well and in accordance with the ethics of the era.

=== New Ireland ===
In 1779, the British adopted a strategy to occupy parts of Maine, especially around Penobscot Bay, and make it a new colony to be called "New Ireland". The scheme was promoted by exiled Loyalists Dr. John Calef (1725–1812) and John Nutting (fl. 1775–85), as well as Englishman William Knox (1732–1810). It was intended to be a permanent colony for Loyalists and a base for military action during the war. The plan ultimately failed because of a lack of interest by the British government and the determination of the Americans to keep all of Maine.

In July 1779, British general Francis McLean captured Castine and built Fort George on the Bagaduce Peninsula on the eastern side of Penobscot Bay. The Commonwealth of Massachusetts sent the Penobscot Expedition led by Massachusetts general Solomon Lovell and Continental Navy captain Dudley Saltonstall. The Americans failed to dislodge the British during a 21-day siege and were routed by the arrival of British reinforcements. The Royal Navy blocked an escape by sea so the Patriots burned their ships near present-day Bangor and walked home. Maine was unable to repel the British threat despite a reorganized defense and the imposition of martial law in selected areas. Some of the most easterly towns tried to become neutral.

After the peace was signed in 1783, the New Ireland proposal was abandoned. In 1784 the British split New Brunswick off from Nova Scotia and made it into the desired Loyalist colony, with deference to King and Church, and with republicanism suppressed. It was almost named "New Ireland".

The 1783 Treaty of Paris that ended the American Revolutionary War ceded western Sunbury County (west of the St. Croix River) from Nova Scotia to Massachusetts, which had an overlapping claim. The treaty was ambiguous about the inland boundary between what came to be known as the District of Maine and the neighboring British provinces of New Brunswick and Quebec. This would set the stage for the bloodless "Aroostook War" a half century later.

== War of 1812 ==
During the War of 1812, Maine suffered the effects of warfare less than most sections of New England. Early in the war there was some Canadian privateering action and Royal Navy harassment along the coast. In September 1813, the memorable combat off Pemaquid between HMS Boxer and USS Enterprise gained international attention. But it wasn't until 1814 that the district was invaded. The U.S. Army and the small U.S. Navy could do little to defend Maine. The national administration assigned nominal resources to the region, concentrating its efforts in the west. The local militia generally proved inadequate to the challenge. However, in the last months of the war, large militia mobilizations discouraged enemy interventions at Wiscasset, Bath, and Portland. British army and naval forces from nearby Nova Scotia captured and occupied the eastern coast from Eastport to Castine, and plundered the Penobscot River towns of Hampden and Bangor (see Battle of Hampden). Legitimate commerce all along the Maine coast was largely stopped—a critical situation for a place so dependent on shipping. In its place an illicit smuggling trade with the British developed, especially at Castine and Eastport. The British gave "New Ireland" to America in the Treaty of Ghent, and Castine was evacuated, although Eastport remained under occupation until 1818. But Maine's vulnerability to foreign invasion, and its lack of protection by Massachusetts, were important factors in the post-war momentum for statehood.

== Maine statehood ==
The Massachusetts General Court passed enabling legislation on June 19, 1819 separating the District of Maine from the rest of the Commonwealth of Massachusetts. The following month, on July 26, voters in the district approved statehood by 17,091 to 7,132.

County	For statehood		For status quo	
County	Votes	PCT	Votes	PCT
Cumberland	3,315	70.4%	1,394	29.6%
Hancock	820	51.9%	761	48.1%
Kennebec	3,950	86.0%	641	14.0%
Lincoln	2,523	62.2%	1,534	37.8%
Oxford	1,893	77.5%	550	22.5%
Penobscot	584	71.7%	231	28.3%
Somerset	1,440	85.9%	237	14.1%
Washington	480	77.7%	138	22.3%
York	2,086	55.9%	1,646	44.2%
Total:	17,091	70.6%	7,132	29.4%

The results of the election were presented to the Massachusetts Governor's Council on August 24, 1819. The Maine Constitution was unanimously approved by the 210 delegates to the Maine Constitutional Convention in October 1819. On February 25, 1820, the General Court passed a follow-up measure officially accepting the fact of Maine's imminent statehood.

At the time of Maine's request for statehood, there were an equal number of free and slave states. Pro-slavery members of the United States Congress saw the admission of another free state, Maine, as a threat to the balance between slave and free states. They would support statehood for Maine only if Missouri Territory, where slavery was legal, would be admitted to the Union as a slave state. Maine became the nation's 23rd state on March 15, 1820, following the Missouri Compromise, which allowed Missouri to enter the Union as a slave-holding state and Maine as a free state. However, Massachusetts still held onto the vast offshore islands of Maine after allowing it to secede, because of the high number of people on them who still wished to remain part of Massachusetts. This lasted only until 1824, when the cost of supplying the islands that were now very hard to access directly from Massachusetts outweighed any profit from holding onto those islands. Massachusetts formally ceded the last of its islands near Maine in late 1824.

William King was elected as the state's first governor. William D. Williamson became the first President of the Maine State Senate. When King resigned as governor in 1821, Williamson automatically succeeded him to become Maine's second governor. That same year, however, he ran for and won a seat in the 17th United States Congress. Upon Williamson's resignation, Speaker of the Maine House of Representatives Benjamin Ames became Maine's third governor for approximately a month until Daniel Rose took office. Rose served only from January 2 to January 5, 1822, filling the unexpired term between the administrations of Ames and Albion K. Parris. Parris served as governor until January 3, 1827.

== The Aroostook War ==
The still-lingering border dispute with British North America came to a head in 1839 when Maine Governor John Fairfield declared virtual war on lumbermen from New Brunswick cutting timber in lands claimed by Maine. Four regiments of the Maine militia were mustered in Bangor and marched to the border, but there was no fighting. The Aroostook War was an undeclared and bloodless conflict that was settled by diplomacy.

Secretary of State Daniel Webster secretly funded a propaganda campaign that convinced Maine leaders that a compromise was wise; Webster used an old map that showed British claims were legitimate. The British had a different old map that showed the American claims were legitimate, so both sides thought the other had the better case. The final border between the two countries was established with the Webster–Ashburton Treaty of 1842, which gave Maine most of the disputed area, and gave the British a militarily vital connection between its provinces of Canada (present-day Quebec and Ontario) and New Brunswick.

The passion of the Aroostook War signaled the increasing role lumbering and logging were playing in the Maine economy, particularly in the central and eastern sections of the state. Bangor arose as a lumbering boom-town in the 1830s, and a potential demographic and political rival to Portland. Bangor became for a time the largest lumber port in the world, and the site of furious land speculation that extended up the Penobscot River valley and beyond.

== Industrialization ==
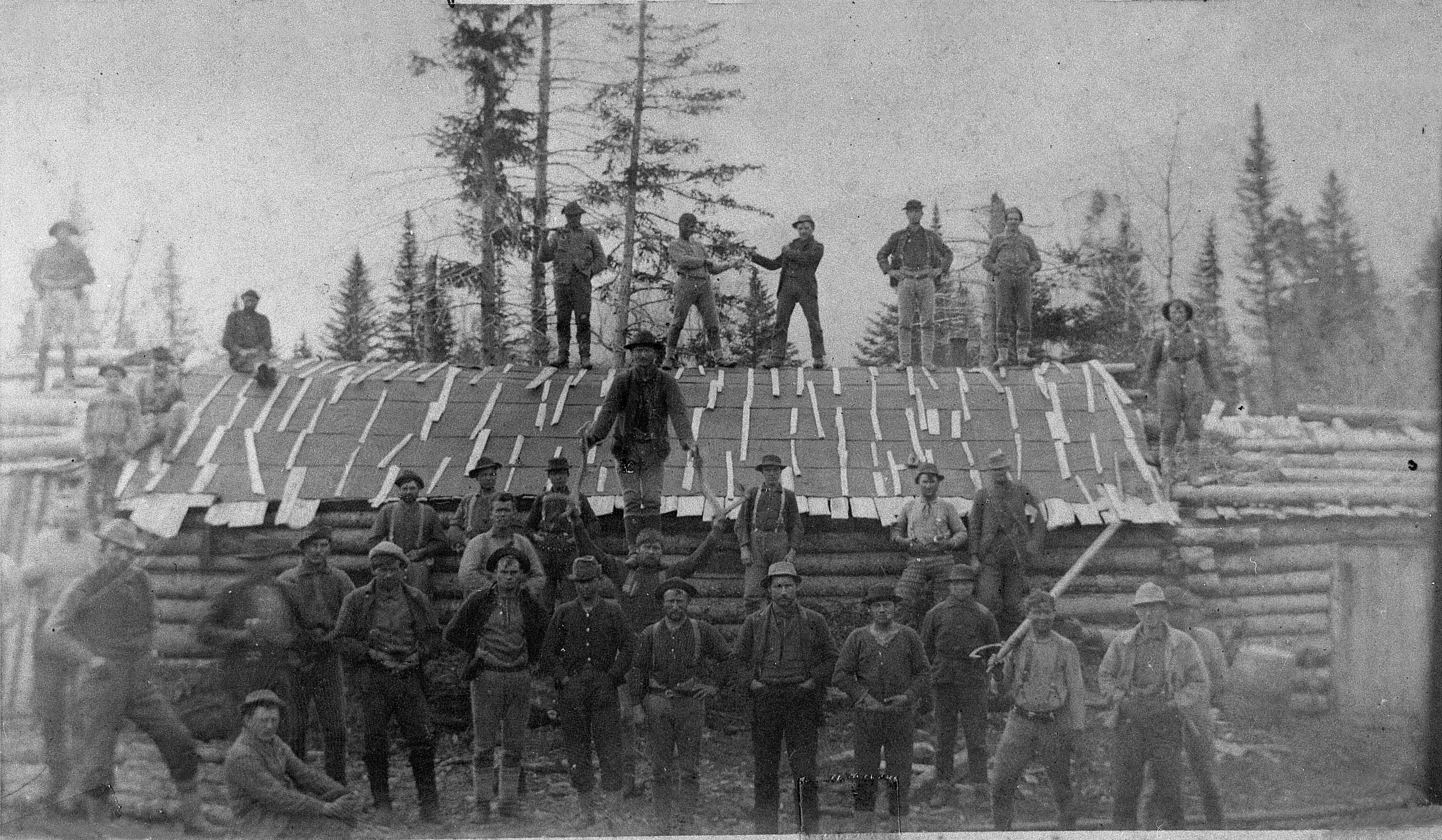
Loggers at Russell Camp, Aroostook County, ca. 1900

Industrialization in 19th-century Maine took a number of forms, depending on the region and period. The river valleys, particularly the Androscroggin, Kennebec and Penobscot, became virtual conveyor belts for the making of lumber beginning in the 1820s-30s. Logging crews penetrated deep into the Maine woods in search of pine (and later spruce) and floated it down to sawmills gathered at waterfalls. The lumber was then shipped from ports such as Bangor, Ellsworth and Cherryfield all over the world.

Partly because of the lumber industry's need for transportation, and partly due to the prevalence of wood and carpenters along a very long coastline, shipbuilding became an important industry in Maine's coastal towns. The Maine merchant marine was huge in proportion to the state's population, and ships and crews from communities such as Bath, Brewer, and Belfast could be found all over the world. The building of very large wooden sailing ships continued in some places into the early 20th century.

Cotton textile mills migrated to Maine from Massachusetts beginning in the 1820s. The major site for cotton textile manufacturing was Lewiston on the Androscoggin River, the most northerly of the Waltham-Lowell system towns (factory towns modeled on Lowell, Massachusetts). The twin cities of Biddeford and Saco, as well as Augusta, Waterville, and Brunswick also became important textile manufacturing communities. These mills were established on waterfalls and amidst farming communities as they initially relied on the labor of farm-girls engaged on short-term contracts. In the years after the Civil War, they would become magnets for immigrant labor.

In addition to fishing, important 19th century industries included granite and slate quarrying, brick-making, and shoe-making.

Starting in the early 20th century, the pulp and paper industry spread into the Maine woods and most of the river valleys from the lumbermen, so completely that Ralph Nader would famously describe Maine in the 1960s as a "paper plantation". Entirely new cities, such as Millinocket and Rumford were established on many of the large rivers.

For all this industrial development, however, Maine remained a largely agricultural state well into the 20th century, with most of its population living in small and widely separated villages. With short growing seasons, rocky soil, and relative remoteness from markets, Maine agriculture was never as prosperous as in other states; the populations of most farming communities peaked in the 1850s, declining steadily thereafter.

=== Railroads ===
Railroads shaped Maine's geography, as was the case with most American states. The first railroad in Maine was the Calais Railroad, incorporated by the state legislature on February 17, 1832. It was built to transport lumber from a mill on the Saint Croix River opposite Milltown, New Brunswick two miles to the tidewater at Calais in 1835. In 1849, the name was changed to the Calais and Baring Railroad and the line was extended four more miles to Baring. In 1870, it became part of the St. Croix and Penobscot Railroad.

The state's second railroad was the Bangor & Piscataquis Railroad & Canal Company incorporated by the legislature on February 18, 1833. It ran eleven miles from Bangor to Oldtown along the west bank of the Penobscot River and opened in November, 1836. In 1854-55, it was extended 1.5 miles across the Penobscot River to Milford and the name was changed to the Bangor, Oldtown & Milford Railroad Company. In 1869, it was absorbed into the European and North American Railway.

The third railroad in Maine was the Portland, Saco and Portsmouth Railroad, incorporated by the legislature on March 14, 1837. This was a crucial step in the development of railroads in Maine because the new railroad connected Portland to Boston by connecting to the Eastern Railroad at Kittery via a bridge to Portsmouth. This railroad was opened on November 21, 1842 and was 51.34 miles in length.

Portland in particular prospered as the terminus of the Grand Trunk railroad from Montreal, essentially becoming Canada's winter port because of efforts by investors like John A. Poor and John Neal. The Portland Company built early railway locomotives and the Portland Terminal Company handled joint switching operations for the Maine Central Railroad and Boston and Maine Railroad. A railroad pushed through to Bangor in the 1850s, and as far as Aroostook County in the early 20th century, farming potato growing as a cash crop.

Belfast and Moosehead Lake Railroad was chartered in 1867 and opened in 1870. Despite the aspirational name its 33 miles of standard gauge tracks connected the port of Belfast to Burnham Junction where they joined with the newly created Maine Central Railroad Company. Maine Central promptly took a 50 year lease on the B&MLR to haul passengers and freight in and out of Waldo County. In 1925 Maine Central declined to renew their lease, citing losses, and the City of Belfast began operating the B&MLR as the only publicly owned freight and passenger rail line in the US.

The Sandy River and Rangeley Lakes Railroad, Bridgton and Saco River Railroad, Monson Railroad, Kennebec Central Railroad and Wiscasset, Waterville and Farmington Railway were built with the unusually narrow gauge of 2 feet (60 cm).

== "Ohio Fever", the California Gold Rush, and westward migration from Maine ==
Even before the tide of settlement crested in most of Maine, some began to leave for The West. The first large-scale exodus was probably in 1816-17, spurred by the privations of the War of 1812, an unusually cold summer, and the expansion of settlements west of the Appalachian Mountains in Ohio. "Ohio Fever" as the lure of the West was initially called, depopulated a number of fledgling Maine communities and stunted the growth of others, even if the overall momentum of settlement had been largely restored by the 1820s, when Maine achieved statehood.

As the American frontier continued to expand westward, Mainers were particularly attracted to the forested states of Michigan, Wisconsin, and Minnesota, and large numbers brought their lumbering skills and knowledge there. Migrants from Maine were particularly prominent in Minnesota; for example, three 19th-century mayors of Minneapolis were Mainers.

The California Gold Rush of 1849 and afterwards was a major boost to the lumber and coastal shipbuilding economies, as building lumber needed to be "shipped around the Horn" from Maine until the establishment of a West Coast sawmilling industry. Maine ships also carried gold-seeking migrants, however, and thus were many Mainers (and aspects of Maine culture, such as lumbering and carpentering) transplanted to California and the Pacific Northwest. Three 19th-century mayors of San Francisco, two governors of California, a governor of Oregon, and two governors of Washington were born in Maine.

== Civil War ==
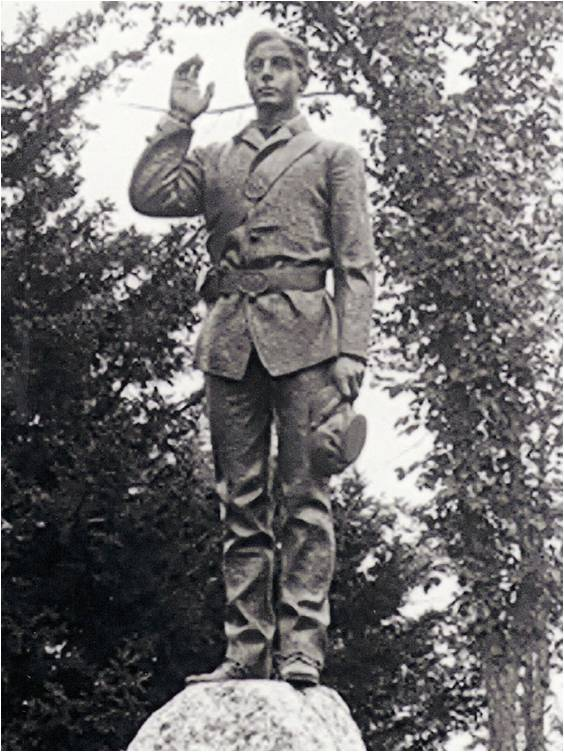
Union private Daniel A. Bean of Brownfield, Maine, 11th Maine Volunteer Infantry Regiment by John Wilson (sculptor)

Maine was the first state in the northeast to support the new anti-slavery Republican Party, partly due to the influence of evangelical Protestantism, and partly to the fact that Maine was a frontier state, and thus receptive to the party's "free soil" platform. Abraham Lincoln chose Maine's Hannibal Hamlin as his first Vice President.

Maine was so enthusiastic for the cause of preserving the Union in the American Civil War that it ended up contributing a larger number of combatants, in proportion to its population, than any other Union state. It was second only to Massachusetts in the number of its sailors who served in the United States Navy. Joshua Chamberlain and Holman Melcher along with the 20th Maine Volunteer Infantry Regiment played a key role at the Battle of Gettysburg, and the 1st Maine Heavy Artillery Regiment lost more soldiers in a single charge (at the Siege of Petersburg) than any Union regiment in the war.

One legacy of the war was Republican Party dominance of state politics for the next half-century and beyond. The state elections came in September and provided pundits of the day with a key indicator of the mood of voters throughout the North—"as Maine goes, so goes the nation" was a familiar phrase.

In the 50-year period 1861 to 1911 (when Democrats temporarily swept most state offices) Maine Republicans served as Vice President, Secretary of State, Secretary of the Treasury (twice), President pro tempore of the Senate, Speaker of the House (twice) and Republican Nominee for the Presidency. This synchronization between the politics of Maine and the nation broke down dramatically in 1936, however, when Maine became one of only two states to vote for the Republican candidate, Alf Landon in Franklin D. Roosevelt's landslide re-election. Maine Republicans remain a force in state politics, but since the elevation of the Polish-American Catholic Democrat Edmund Muskie to the governorship in the 1950s, Maine has been a balanced two-party state. The most nationally influential Maine Republicans in recent decades include former senators William Cohen and Olympia Snowe, and Senator Susan Collins.

== Temperance ==
Maine became the first state to pass a Prohibition statute, signed into law by Governor Hugh J. Anderson in 1846 after 20 years of advocacy by various native Temperance societies. The leading saloon-buster and future Portland mayor, Neal Dow, would later serve in the Maine legislature, as well become a brigadier general for the Union in the Civil War. This and other subsequently passed Maine laws mostly regulated the sale of distilled liquor, but in 1884 Temperance advocates succeeded in getting the 26th amendment to the state constitution passed through the legislature then by a large majority of voters—70,783 yeas; 23,811 nays. Though all alcoholic beverages (except cider) were outlawed for production and sale by the 26th amendment, enforcement was inconsistent and mostly lax, differing from town to town.

The US Congress and 36 states passed the Eighteenth Amendment in 1919 to extend Prohibition nationally, but its popularity quickly eroded leading to repealed by the Twenty-first Amendment in 1933. Maine followed suit with the 54th amendment to their constitution repealing the 22nd soon after in 1934.

== Immigrants ==
=== Early Europeans ===
After the 1604 settlement at Saint Croix Island and the 1607 Popham Colony experiment French and English settlers established communities up and down the coast of Maine and inland via the rivers. The English colonists were mostly governed from the Plymouth Colony and later Boston while the French monitored from Quebec. These colonial powers frequently clashed, often pulling native communities into these fights on both sides. It was not until the 1763 Treaty of Paris that England gained full control over the North Atlantic coast and regular colonial hostilities receded.

=== Irish ===
Maine experienced a wave of Irish immigration in the mid-19th century, though many came to the state via Canada and Massachusetts, and before the Great Famine. There was a riot in Bangor between Irish and Yankee (nativist) sailors and lumbermen as early as 1834, and a number of early Catholic churches were burned or vandalized in coastal communities, where the Know-Nothing Party briefly flourished. After the Civil War, Maine's Irish-Catholic population began a process of integration and upward mobility.

=== French Canadians ===
In the late 19th century, many French Canadians arrived from Quebec and New Brunswick to work in the textile mill cities such as Lewiston and Biddeford. By the mid 20th century Franco-Americans comprised 30% of the state's population. Some migrants became lumberjacks but most concentrated in industrialized areas and into enclaves known as 'Little Canadas.'

Québécois immigrant women saw the United States as a place of opportunity and possibility where they could create alternatives for themselves distinct from the expectations of their parents and their community. By the early 20th century, some French Canadian women even began to see migration to the United States to work as a rite of passage and a time of self-discovery and self-reliance. When these women did marry, they had fewer children with longer intervals between children than their Canadian counterparts. Some women never married, and oral accounts suggest that self-reliance and economic independence were important reasons for choosing work over marriage and motherhood. These women conformed to traditional premigration gender ideals in order to retain their 'Canadienne' cultural identity, but they also redefined these roles in ways that provided them increased independence in their roles as wives and mothers.

The Franco-Americans became active in the Catholic Church where they tried with little success to challenge its domination by Irish clerics. They founded such newspapers as 'Le Messager' and 'La Justice'. Lewiston's first hospital became a reality in 1889 when the Sisters of Charity of Montreal, the 'Grey Nuns', opened the doors of the Asylum of Our Lady of Lourdes. This hospital was central to the Grey Nuns' mission of providing social services for Lewiston's predominantly French Canadian mill workers. The Grey Nuns struggled to establish their institution despite meager financial resources, language barriers, and opposition from the established medical community. Immigration dwindled after World War I.

The French-Canadian community in New England tried to preserve some of its cultural norms. This doctrine, like efforts to preserve francophone culture in Quebec, became known as la Survivance. With the decline of the state's textile industry during the 1950s, the French element experienced a period of upward mobility and assimilation. This pattern of assimilation increased during the 1970s and 1980s as many Catholic organizations switched to English names and parish children entered public schools; some parochial schools closed in the 1970s. Although some ties to its French-Canadian origins remain, the community was largely anglicized by the 1990s, moving almost completely from 'Canadien' to 'American'.

Representative of the assimilation process was the career of singer and icon of American popular culture Rudy Vallée (1901–86). He grew up in Westbrook, Maine, and after service in World War I attended the University of Maine, then transferred to Yale, and went on to become as a popular music star. He never forgot his Maine roots, and maintained an estate at Kezar Lake.

=== Jews ===
Jews have been living in Maine for 200 years with significant Jewish communities in Bangor as early as the 1840s and in Portland since the 1880s. The arrival of Susman Abrams in 1785 was followed by a history of immigration and settlement that parallels the history of Jewish immigration to the United States. What initially brought people to these various towns around Maine was the promise of work, often linked with opportunities that supported Maine’s shipbuilding, lumber and mill industries.

=== English and Scottish ===
A large number of immigrants of English and Scottish-Canadian stock relocated from the Maritime Provinces.

=== Scandinavians ===
The first Europeans on North American soil were vikings from Norway led by Leif Eriksson. These Norwegians traded with the native Penobscot. In 1797, the town of Norway, Maine was incorporated and attracted a small group of Norwegians.

A Swedish colony in Maine was started in Aristook by William W. Thomas Jr. to recruit Swedish Loggers. This came to be known as the town of New Sweden. Other towns with big Swedish populations were Stockholm and Westmanland.

The towns of Denmark and South Portland attracted Danish immigrants to Maine, also as loggers and dockworkers.

=== Somalis ===
In the 2000s, Somalis began a secondary migration to Maine from other states on account of the area's low crime rate, good schools and cheap housing.

Mainly concentrated in Lewiston, Somalis have opened up community centers to cater to their community. In 2001, the non-profit organization United Somali Women of Maine (USWM) was founded in Lewiston, seeking to promote the empowerment of Somali women and girls across the state.

In August 2010, the Lewiston Sun Journal reported that Somali entrepreneurs had helped reinvigorate downtown Lewiston by opening dozens of shops in previously closed storefronts. Amicable relations were also reported by the local merchants of French-Canadian descent and the Somali storekeepers.

=== Bantus ===
Due to the civil war in Somalia, the United States government classified the Somali Bantu (an ethnic minority group in the country) as a priority, and began preparations to resettle an estimated 12,000 Bantu refugees in select cities throughout the U.S. Most of the early arrivals in the United States settled in Clarkston, Georgia, a city adjacent to Atlanta. However, they were mostly assigned to low rent, poverty-stricken inner city areas, so many began to look to resettle elsewhere in the US. After 2005, many Bantus were resettled in Maine by aid agencies. Catholic Charities Maine is the refugee resettlement agency that provides the bulk of the services for the Bantus' resettlement.

The state's Bantu community is served by the Somali Bantu Community Mutual Assistance Association of Lewiston/Auburn Maine (SBCMALA), which focuses on housing, employment, literacy and education, health and safety matters.

== Demographics ==
Largely because of Irish and French-Canadian immigration, 40% of Maine's population was Catholic by 1900; the Catholic Church ran its own school system in the cities, where almost all Catholics lived. This demographic and its resulting social and political ramifications led to a backlash in the 1920s, as the Ku Klux Klan formed cells in a number of Maine towns.

The immigrant population was largely responsible for the steady growth of the Democratic Party, however, which gave Maine a true two-party system in the years after World War II. The election in 1954 of Governor Edmund Muskie, a Catholic Polish American tailor's son from the mill-town of Rumford, was a major watershed. The governor from 2003 to 2011, John Baldacci, is of Italian American and Arab American ancestry from Bangor.

=== Summer residents ===
Maine's natural beauty, cool summers and proximity to the large East Coast cities made it a major tourist destination as early as the 1850s. The visitors enjoyed the local handicrafts; the most successful was carving out a mythical image of Maine as a bucolic rustic haven from modern urban woes. The mythical image, elaborately polished for 150 years, attracts tourist dollars to an economically depressed state. Summer resorts such as Bar Harbor, Sorrento, and Islesboro sprung up along the coast, and soon urbanites were building houses—ranging from mansions to shacks, but all called "cottages"—in what had formerly been shipbuilding and fishing villages. Maine's seasonal residents transformed the economy of the seacoast and to some extent its culture, especially when some began staying all year round.

The Bush family and their compound in Kennebunkport are a notable example of this demographic. The Rockefeller family were conspicuous members of the summer community at Bar Harbor. Summer residents who were painters and writers began to define the state's image through their work.

== 1915 Vanceboro international bridge bombing ==
The 1915 Vanceboro international bridge bombing was an attempt to destroy the Saint Croix-Vanceboro Railway Bridge on February 2, 1915, by Imperial German spies.

This international bridge crossed the St. Croix River between the border hamlets of St. Croix in the Canadian province of New Brunswick and Vanceboro in the U.S. state of Maine. At the time of the sabotage attempt in 1915, the bridge was jointly owned and operated by the Canadian Pacific Railway (reporting mark CP) on the Canadian side and the Maine Central Railroad (reporting mark MEC) on the American side.

The bombing was masterminded by then spymaster Franz von Papen and executed by Werner Horn. The bomb failed to destroy the bridge but made it unsafe to use until minor repairs were done. The explosion did however blow out windows in nearby buildings in St. Croix and Vanceboro.

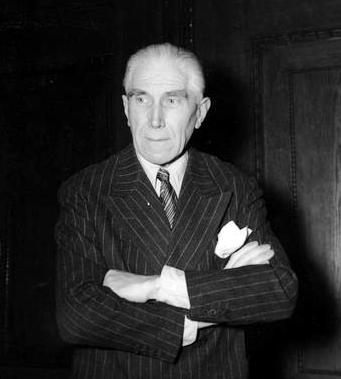
Franz von Papen at the Nuremberg War Crimes Trials in 1946

In 1915 the United States was still a neutral country in World War I. The Canadian Pacific Railway was enjoined from carrying any war goods or troops onto or through United States territory. After Japan entered the war in 1914 on behalf of its British ally, Germany feared that Japan might send troops to the Western Front, across the Pacific Ocean and through Canada, en route. The German government was convinced that would occur and ordered that the Canadian railway system be interrupted.

At the outbreak of World War I, Werner Horn was a German reserve army lieutenant who had been in Moka, Guatemala, as the manager of a coffee plantation. After hearing about the outbreak of war, he departed the plantation looking to return to Germany. From Moka, he proceeded to British Honduras, and from there sailed to Galveston, Texas, and onwards to New York City. He was unable to depart for Germany due to the British blockade in the North Sea. After attempting to set sail for over a month, he travelled to Mexico City to return to the plantation. While there, he learned that someone else had taken his job. He found work at another plantation in Salto de Agua, Chiapas, but before he could leave, he received a card telling him to return to Germany.

On December 26, 1914, Horn travelled to New Orleans and then returned to New York, where he stayed in the Arietta Hotel. While there he met Franz von Papen, the military attaché of the German Embassy in Washington, DC. Von Papen was seeking saboteurs to disrupt Canadian railways and thought that Horn, who was eager to serve the fatherland, was an ideal candidate. Von Papen went on to explain to the zealous Horn that the bombing would be seen as an act of courage and valour in Germany and that no one would be killed in the process. The bridge was heavily used at the time, and there was a good chance that a train would be caught up in any explosion. Horn was paid $700 ($22,300 in 2025) to destroy the St. Croix-Vanceboro railway bridge.

Horn left New York from Grand Central Terminal on a New Haven Railroad passenger train to Boston on January 29, 1915, carrying a suitcase of dynamite. He took the overnight train out of Boston (operated by the Boston and Maine Railroad), placing the suitcase of explosives in a lower berth. Horn's sleeping car was transferred to the Maine Central Railroad in Portland and proceeded east across Maine to the Maine Central's eastern terminus at the border hamlet of Vanceboro the following day. Upon arrival in Vanceboro, Horn checked into the Exchange Hotel and was observed hiding the suitcase in a wood pile outdoors while scouting the railway bridge on the border over the St. Croix River several hundred feet to the east; this bridge was jointly owned by the Canadian Pacific Railway and the Maine Central Railroad. At least three Vanceboro residents reported his suspicious behaviour to the US immigration inspector. The inspector interviewed Horn at the hotel, and Horn assured him that he was merely a Danish farmer looking to purchase land in the area. Horn spent the next two days maintaining a low profile and watching the extremely-busy Canadian Pacific Railway main line to determine the schedule of trains.

On the night of Monday, February 1, 1915, Horn checked out of the hotel claiming to be catching a train that evening. He apparently changed into a German army uniform to avoid being convicted of being a spy (and potentially executed) before proceeding to the railway bridge over the St. Croix River sometime after midnight.

Horn proceeded to position a suitcase filled with explosives on the Canadian side of the bridge but was interrupted by an oncoming train and was forced to move out of its path. After he was sure that it had passed, he proceeded to reposition the explosives. He was interrupted a second time by another train. Puzzled and not wanting to kill anyone, he waited until 1:07 a.m. on February 2 before again repositioning the bomb on a girder. Horn cut the fuse, which changed the time before the explosion from fifty minutes to only three. Horn lit the fuse with a cigar and somehow made it back to the Exchange Hotel through a gale in −30 °F (−34 °C) temperature before the dynamite exploded. At 1:10 a.m. on Tuesday, February 2, 1915, the bomb exploded, blowing out windows across Vanceboro and St. Croix and exposing residents to the freezing air outside. Some iron beams on the bridge were twisted or bent, but the damage was relatively minor.

Horn had frostbite on his hands and was assisted by the hotel's proprietor, who allowed him to check back in for the night. The proprietor connected the explosion with Horn's suspicious presence and, upon being informed by residents of the community who had discovered the source and target of the explosion, informed the CPR, which closed the bridge and rerouted trains pending a safety inspection.

Railway officials inspected the bridge the following morning and discovered the damage was relatively minor, resulting in the bridge being out of service for only several days.

== Modern Maine ==
By the middle of the 20th century, the textile industry was establishing itself more profitably in the American South, and some of these Maine cities began to de-industrialize as wages rose above those of the South. In 1937, the Lewiston-Auburn Shoe Strike involved 4,000 to 5,000 textile workers on strike in Lewiston and Auburn. It was one of the largest labor disputes in state history. Shipbuilding also ceased in all but a few places, notably Bath and its successful Bath Iron Works, which became a notable producer of naval vessels during the Second World War and after. In recent years, however, even Maine's most traditional industries have been threatened; forest conservation efforts have diminished logging, and restrictions on fisheries have likewise exerted considerable pressure along the coast. The last "heavy industry" in Maine, pulp and paper began to withdraw in the late 20th century, leaving the future of the Maine Woods an open question.

In response, the state attempted to buttress retailing and service industries, especially those linked to tourism. The label Vacationland was added to license plates in the 1960s. More recent tax incentives have encouraged outlet shopping centers such as the cluster at Freeport. Increasing numbers of visitors began to enjoy Maine's vast tracts of relatively unspoiled wilderness, mountains, and expansive coastline. State and national parks in Maine also became loci of middle-class tourism, especially Acadia National Park on Mount Desert Island.

The growth of Portland and areas of southern Maine and the retraction of job opportunities (and population) in the northern and eastern areas of the state led in the 1990s to discussion of "two Maines", with potentially different interests. Portland and certain coastal towns aside, Maine remains the poorest state in the Northeast. By some accounts, adjusting for its high taxes and living costs, Maine has been since at least the 1970s the poorest state in the United States. The notion that Maine is indeed the poorest state in the US is supported by its exceptionally high levels of welfare dependence over the past half-century.

The COVID-19 pandemic was publicly reported to have reached the U.S. state of Maine on March 12, 2020. As of February 2, 2021, the Maine Department of Health and Human Services reported 131,530 confirmed cases and 46,971 probable cases in the state, with 1,777 deaths attributed to the virus.

On March 12, Maine announced the state's first confirmed case of the coronavirus, a Navy reservist in her 50s from Androscoggin County who had returned from duty in Italy. On March 27, 2020, Maine reported its first death due to coronavirus, which was a man in his 80s from Cumberland County. On April 29, 8 employees working at a local Tyson Foods meat packaging plant in Portland, Maine tested positive for COVID-19 prompting talks about halting the plant's production. On the same day, 20 cases were confirmed at the Penobscot Hope House Health and Living Center in Bangor, Maine which houses a homeless shelter.

The Maine Center for Disease Control and Prevention reported that the state's second-largest outbreak occurred after a wedding reception on August 7, 2020. Sixty-five people attended a reception in Millinocket at a hall that had a capacity for 50 people. About half the 53 cases were found in wedding guests, and one woman, who was not a guest, died on August 22. It is unclear if guests wore masks. By September 5, the outbreak had infected 177 people and caused seven deaths, including 80 cases at a prison 230 mi (370 km) away. A lawyer for the officiant at the wedding said the Calvary Baptist Church in Sanford was encouraging its congregants to not wear masks, and the church's school, Sanford Christian Academy, does not require face coverings.

On October 22, 2020, 46 COVID-19 cases were linked to a fellowship rally between October 2 and October 4 at the Brooks Pentecostal Church.

After his death on December 11, 2021, at 62, the Sun Journal reported 2020 U.S. Senate candidate Max Linn may have been the first person in Maine with COVID-19 after he returned from a business trip to Wuhan, China in late December 2019.

On 25 October 2023, the Lewiston mass shooting occurred, becoming the deadliest in the history of Maine, as well as one of the deadliest mass shootings in United States history, with a total of 18 individuals losing their lives (not including the perpetrator).

== See also ==
- Maine Historical Society
- List of historical societies in Maine
- Women's suffrage in Maine
- History of New England
- List of colonial governors of Maine
- Herb Adams, politician and historian of Maine
- Neil Rolde, politician and historian of Maine
- Earle G. Shettleworth Jr. sixth State Historian, appointed in 2004
- Timeline of Portland, Maine

== Notes ==
=== Works cited ===
- Bruce, J. G. (1979). The History of McAdam 1871–1977 (Vanceboro Bridge. Pages 149–150). McAdam: McAdam Senior Citizens Historical and Recreational Club. ISBN 0-9690976-0-3.
- Mount, Graemme Stewart (1993). Canada's Enemies (Threats and Conspiracies during World War I. Pages 31–32). Dundurn Press Ltd. ISBN 1-55002-190-7.
- Strother, French (2004). Fighting Germany's Spies (Pages 3–59). Kessinger Publishing. ISBN 1-4179-3169-8.

== Bibliography ==
=== 18th – 19th-century histories ===
- Mather Cotten. Magnalia Christi Americana, or, The ecclesiastical history of New-England: from its first planting in the year 1620, unto the year of Our Lord, 1698, in seven books (1702)
- A summary, historical and political, of the first planting, progressive ... By William Douglass. 1755
- Hubbard's Narrative History of the Indian Wars. 1677
- Hubbard, William (1865). Samuel G. Drake (ed.). The History of the Indian Wars in New England: from the First Settlement to the Termination of the War with King Philip in 1677. Vol. II. Roxbury, Massachusetts: W. Elliot Woodward.
- Thomas Hutchingson. The history of the province of Massachusetts-Bay. Vol. 1. 1828
- Thomas Hitchingson. Story of the province of Massachusetts bay, from 1749 to 1774, Vol. 2
- George Minot. Continuation of the history of Massachusetts Bay, Vol. 1, 1798
- George Minot. Continuation of the history of Massachusetts Bay, Vol. 2
- Samuel Niles, "History of the Indian and French wars," (1760) reprinted in Mass. Hist. Soc. Coll., 3d ser., VI (1837), 248–50
- Morse, J. (1797). "District of Maine". The American Gazetteer. Boston, Massachusetts: At the presses of S. Hall, and Thomas & Andrews. OL 23272543M.
- Samuel Penhallow. History of the New England Wars with the Eastern Indians. 1726
- Journal of John Pike
- Samuel Sewell vol. 1 (1674-1729)
- Rufus Sewall. Ancient dominions of Maine. 1859
- Journals of the Rev. Thomas Smith, and the Rev. Samuel Deane, pastors of the First church in Portland: with notes and biographical notices: and a Summary history of Portland (1849)
- James Sullivan. History of Maine. 1796
- Stevens, John, Cabot Abbott, Edward Henry Elwell. The History of Maine (1892). comprehensive older history
- Herbert Sylvester. Indian Wars of New England Vol. 1
- Herbert Sylvester. Indian Wars of New England Vol. 3
- William D. Williamson, The History of the State of Maine, Vol. 1 (1832)
- William Williamson. History of Maine 'Vol. 2

=== Contemporary ===
- Clark, Charles E. et al. eds. Maine in the Early Republic: From Revolution to Statehood (1989)
- Hatch, Louis Clinton. Maine A History vol.1, vol2, vol 3, (1919)
- Leamon, James S. (1993). Revolution Downeast: The War for American Independence in Maine. University of Massachusetts Press. Archived from the original on 2012-10-23 – via Questia.
- Lockard, Duane. New England State Politics (1959) pp 79–118; covers 1932–1958
- MacDonald, William. The Government of Maine: Its History and Administration (1902).
- Palmer, Kenneth T.; Taylor, G. Thomas; Librizzi, Marcus A. (1992). Maine Politics & Government. University of Nebraska Press – via Questia.
- Rolde, Neil Maine: A Narrative History (1990)
- Smith, Joshua M. Making Maine: Statehood and the War of 1812 (2022), Amherst, MA, University of Massachusetts Press
- Peirce, Neal R. The New England States: People, Politics, and Power in the Six New England States (1976) pp 362–420; updated in Neal R. Peirce and Jerry Hagstrom, The Book of America: Inside the Fifty States Today (1983) pp 208–13
- Stewart, Alice R. "The Franco-Americans of Maine: A Historiographical Essay," Maine Historical Society Quarterly 1987 26(3): 160-179
- WPA (1937). Maine, a Guide down East. Archived from the original on 2009-06-04 – via Questia.

=== Local and specialty studies ===
- History of Saco
- History of Wells
- History of York, Maine
- Bourque, Bruce J. (2001). Twelve Thousand Years: American Indians in Maine. University of Nebraska Press. Archived from the original on 2009-06-04 – via Questia.
- History of Thomaston, Rockland, and South Thomaston, Maine: From ..., Volume 1 By Cyrus Eaton
- History of Brunswick, Topsham, and Harpswell, Maine Including Ancient Pejepscot. By George Augustus Wheeler and Henry Warren Wheeler. Published 1878.
- History of Castine, Penobscot, and Brooksville, Maine including the ancient settlement of Pentagoet. By George Augustus Wheeler. Published 1875.
- William Willis. History of Portland. 1865
- Sketches of the History of the Town of Camden, Maine. By John Lymburner Locke. Published 1859.
- History of Boothbay, Southport and Boothbay Harbor, Maine, 1623–1905. By Francis Byron Greene. Published 1906.
- History of Farmington, Maine, from Its First Settlement. By Thomas Parker. Published 1875.
- History of Bath and Environs, Sagadahoc County, Maine, 1607-1894. By Parker McCobb Reed.
- The Makers of Maine: Essays and Tales of Early Maine History. By Herbert Edgar Holmes. Published 1912.
- Sketches of the Ecclesiastical History of the State of Maine. By Jonathan Greenleaf. Published 1821.
- A History of the Baptists in Maine. By Joshua Millet. Published 1845.
- History of the First Maine Cavalry, 1861-1865. By Edward Parsons Tobie. Published 1887.
- History of Piscataquis County, Maine: From Its Earliest Settlement to 1880. By Amasa Loring. Published 1880.
- A History of Swan's Island, Maine. By Herman Wesley Small. Published 1898.
- Genealogical and Family History of the State of Maine. By Henry Sweetser Burrage, Albert Roscoe Stubbs. Published 1909, Vol. 1.
- The History of Waterford: Oxford County, Maine. By Henry Pelt Warren, William Warren. Published 1879.
- The History of Sanford, Maine, 1661-1900. By Edwin Emery, William Morrell Emery. Published 1901.
- History of Rumford, Oxford County, 156651645Maine: From Its First Settlement in 1779. By William Berry Lapham. Published 1890.
- History of the City of Belfast in the State of Maine. By Joseph Williamson. Published 1877.
- History of Belfast in the 20th Century by Jay Davis and Tim Hughes with Megan Pinette. Published 2002 by the Belfast History Project
- A History of the Town of Industry: Franklin County, Maine. By William Collins Hatch. Published 1893.
- History of the Maine State College and the University of Maine. By Merritt Caldwell Fernald. Published 1916.
- Fannie Hardy Eckstorm, Mary Winslow Smyth; Minstrelsy of Maine: Folk-Songs and Ballads of the Woods and the Coast, (1927) online edition
- Horwitz, Richard P. (1978). Anthropology toward History: Culture and Work in a 19th Century Maine Town. Wesleyan University Press. Archived from the original on 2009-06-04 – via Questia.

=== Collections of the Maine Historical Society ===
First Series

- Collections of the Maine Historical Society, Vol.1, 1865
- Collections of the Maine Historical Society, Vol.2, 1847
- Vol. 3
- Vol. 4
- Collections of the Maine Historical Society, Vol.5, 1857
- Collections of the Maine Historical Society, Vol. 6
- Collections of the Maine Historical Society, Vol.7, 1859
- Collections of the Maine Historical Society, Vol.8, 1881
- Collections of the Maine Historical Society, Vol.9, 1887
- Collections of the Maine Historical Society - Index Vol.1-10

Second Series

- Collections of the Maine Historical Society, Second Series. Vol.1, 1890
- Second Series, Vol. 2
- Collections of the Maine Historical Society, Second Series. Vol.3, 1892
- Collections of the Maine Historical Society, Second Series. Vol.4, 1893
- Collections of the Maine Historical Society, Second Series, Volume 5 (1894)
- Collections of the Maine Historical Society, Second Series. Vol.6, 1895
- Vol.7
- Vol. 8
- Vol. 9
- Collections of the Maine Historical Society, Second Series. Vol.10, 1899

Third Series

- Collections of the Maine Historical Society, Third Series. Vol.1, 1901
- Collections of the Maine Historical Society, Third Series. Vol.2, 1906

=== Documentary history on the State of Maine (1869) ===
- Vol. 6
- Vol 7
- Vol. 9 (1689-1723)
- Documentary history of the state of Maine, vol. 10 (1662-1729)
- Vol. 11 (1729-1749)
- Vo. 12 (1749-1755)
- Vol. 13 (1755-1768)
- Vol. 14 (1776-1777)
- Vol. 15 (1777-1778)
- vol. 16 (1778-1779)
- Vol. 17 (1777-1779)
- Vol.18 (1778-1780)
- Vol.19 (1780-1782)
- Vol. 20 (1781-1785)
- Vol. 21 (1785-1788)
- Vol. 22 (1788-1791)
- Vol. 23 (Native affairs)
- Vol. 24 (Native affairs)
