= Richard Bonython =

English settler in America (1580–1650)

- Born: 1580; St Columb Major, Cornwall, England
- Died: 1650 (aged 69–70); Province of Maine
- Occupations: Landowner, magistrate

Richard Bonython (1580–1650) was an English magistrate and early settler and landowner in New England. The second son of a Cornish landowner, he served as a military officer before emigrating to the Province of Maine in 1630 with his family. He co-owned a portion of land adjacent to the Saco River and was appointed a magistrate. During his judicial career his son John was brought before the court and was eventually outlawed, for which he was mentioned in an 1830 poem of John Greenleaf Whittier. Bonython later served as a councillor to the deputy governor of Maine Thomas Gorges.

== Early life ==
Coat of Arms of Richard Bonython

Bonython was born to John Bonython, a Cornish landowner, and Elinor Bonython née Myleinton in 1580. His father's estate was Bonython Manor, at Cury on the Lizard Peninsula, but Richard was born at the estate of his mother's family on the North Cornwall coast at St Columb Major. He was baptised at St Columb Major on either 3 or 8 April 1580.

Bonython was married to Lucretia Leight of St Thomas-by-Launceston and had a number of children. By one source these included Grace (baptised 1610 at St Breage's Church, Breage), Elizabeth (baptised sometime before 1614) and Susannah (baptised February 1614). Another source lists his children as John, Thomas, Gabriel, Thomas, Winefred & Elinor. A Richard Bonython is named as keeper of the gaol at Lostwithiel in 1603 and comptroller of the stannaries of Cornwall and Devonshire in 1603 and 1604. Bonython is thought to have served as a military officer in the "French Wars" (possibly the Anglo-French War) and was afterwards known as Captain Bonython. He may have served under Sir Ferdinando Gorges, with whom he later had dealings in British North America.

== Maine ==
In 1630 or 1631 Bonython emigrated to the fledgling English settlements in the Province of Maine (established under patent by Gorges) in North America. This move may have been triggered by the birth of a son to his elder brother Resymar, who would then inherit the Bonython family estates. He travelled to Maine with his son John and two of his daughters.

Bonython owned, with Thomas Lewis, a tract of land measuring 4 miles (6.4 km) by 8 miles (13 km) alongside the Saco River and planned on constructing a plantation there. Owing to his previous military service he was held in high regard by the early settlers of Maine and was appointed a magistrate of Saco during the time Richard Vines led the colony. The first court in Maine to be held under the authority of deputy governor William Gorges was held in Bonython's house on 25 March 1636. One of those appearing before Bonython was Bonython's son John, who was accused of fathering an illegitimate child. John had other run-ins with the legal system; in 1645 he threatened to "kill and slay any person that should lay hands on him", and Richard Bonython's court which heard the case afterwards described him as "incapable of any of his Majesty's laws". He was outlawed and is mentioned as such in John Greenleaf Whittier's 1830 poem Mogg Megone: "The hunted outlaw, Bonython! A low, lean, swarthy man is he, With blanket-garb and buskined knee, And naught of English fashion on". Whittier described Richard Bonython as "one of the most efficient and able magistrates of the Colony."

A descendant of the Bonython family writing in 1882 noted that records from early Maine showed that a woman was ordered "to be publicly whipped for abusing Captain Bonython". Richard Bonython seems to have opposed the Puritan teachings of Saco's Reverend Thomas Jenner, favouring the Church of England. He served as a commissioner for the Province of Maine and, in 1640, was appointed a councillor to deputy governor Thomas Gorges. Bonython ceased to be a councillor in 1647 and died in 1650. His son's line died out, but there are many descendants of his daughters in America, one of whom was the poet Henry Wadsworth Longfellow.
