= List of colonial governors of Maine =

The territory that became the United States state of Maine has a tangled colonial history. After the failed Popham Colony of 1607–08, portions of Maine's territory were styled the Province of Maine and Lygonia, and subjected to colonial governments in the 17th century. Other portions were governed either by the Massachusetts Bay Colony, either through land claims made based on the geographic descriptions in its charter, or by outright purchase. The easternmost portions (between Kennebec River and the St. Croix River were claimed by the French province of Acadia until the fall of New France in 1760, although only the area east of Penobscot Bay was occupied by them.

From 1652 until statehood the territory of Maine west of the Kennebec River was part of Massachusetts. The territory between the Kennebec and St. Croix was granted to the Duke of York in 1664, and became part of the Province of New York, although the area east of Penobscot Bay was in Acadian hands. The parts west of the bay (principally the Pemaquid area, present-day Bristol), were governed from New York until 1692, when the New York claim was transferred to the new Province of Massachusetts Bay.

The colonial governors listed here are those whose principal seat of government was actually in modern Maine territory. Separate lists identify the colonial governors of Massachusetts, New York, and Acadia. One governor of Acadia, Hector d'Andigné de Grandfontaine, formally established his capital on Maine territory (at Fort Pentagouet, present-day Castine) in 1670; all the others governed from capitals (most frequently Port Royal) in present-day Nova Scotia and New Brunswick.

== Popham Colony ==
The Popham Colony was founded on the coast of present-day Phippsburg, Maine in 1607 as a colonization attempt by the Virginia Company of Plymouth. The colony lasted about one year before being abandoned. One of its principal backers was Sir John Popham; his nephew George was the colony's governor for most of its existence. George Popham died in the colony in 1608, and was replaced by Raleigh Gilbert. He and the remaining colonists abandoned the colony after word arrived that John Popham and Gilbert's older brother, Sir John Gilbert had died.

Governor	Took office	Left office
George Popham	1607	February 1608
Raleigh Gilbert	February 1608	September 1608
Source: Grizzard and Smith, p. 189

== Province of Maine and Lygonia ==
The Province of Maine is first mentioned in a charter to Sir Ferdinando Gorges and John Mason in 1622 from the Plymouth Council for New England, covering territory between the Merrimack and Kennebec rivers. In 1629 Gorges and Mason divided the larger grant, with Mason taking the southern part (with a northern bound at the Piscataqua River), which he called the Province of New Hampshire. Gorges retained the northern portion, which he called New Somersetshire. Even though this grant did not include the right to govern the territory (it only conveyed ownership), Gorges established a government in his territory under his nephew William, who based himself at Saco. In 1639 he received a new charter from King Charles I that again called the territory the Province of Maine. Sir Ferdinando established himself as proprietor and governor, with Thomas Gorges, a cousin, as his deputy. Thomas Gorges left the colony in 1643, after which Sir Ferdinando (who never saw the New World) left governance of the colony in the hands of a local council. The council elected Richard Vines as deputy governor in 1644. Sir Ferdinando died in 1647, removing a significant force in maintaining the colony. In 1649 the colonists of Sir Ferdinando's lands met, electing Edward Godfrey as governor.

In 1643 a colonel in the Parliamentary Army, Alexander Rigby, purchased the territory of Lygonia. This territory was supposed to be to the east of Gorges' holding but in reality they significantly overlapped. The western bound of Lygonia was held to be Cape Porpoise, and the eastern bound the Kennebec, placing present-day Portland, Saco, and Scarborough under its control. Rigby sent George Cleeve, a settler who had fallen out with Gorges and then engineered the sale, back to Maine with a commission as his deputy president. The dispute over their respective territories was decided in 1646 by a judgment in England in favor of Rigby. Cleeve governed until Rigby's death in 1650, after which Lygonia's settlers progressively agreed to Massachusetts rule.

As early as 1639, some landholders in Maine signed agreements with the Massachusetts Bay Colony, in which the settlers subjected themselves to the governmental jurisdiction of Massachusetts in exchange for its protection. By 1652 Massachusetts had argued its land claims before the governments of Cleeve and Godfrey. Although Godfrey at first strenuously objected to these claims, popular opinion eventually fell against him, and in November 1652 Massachusetts took control of Maine.

In 1676, the Lords of Trade in England issued a decision denying the Massachusetts land claims in Maine. Massachusetts then purchased the claims of the Gorges heirs (as reduced by the 1646 decision separating Lygonia) for £1,250 in May 1677, and in 1680 constituted a new government in this territory. Thomas Danforth, the Massachusetts deputy governor, was elected president of the territory, a post he occupied until 1686, when the Dominion of New England took over all Massachusetts territory. The dominion collapsed after the arrest of its governor, Sir Edmund Andros, and the previous government was restored until the inception of the Province of Massachusetts Bay in 1692, which claimed all of present-day Maine as part of its territory.

=== Governors and deputy governors of Maine ===
- Richard Vines (1629) as Governor of the Plantation at Saco (forerunner of the Province of Maine)
- Walter Neale (1629) as Governor of the Laconia Company (forerunner of the Province of Lygonia)
- William Gorges (1636–38)
- Sir Ferdinando Gorges (1639–47)
  - Thomas Gorges (1640–43)
  - Richard Vines (1644–45)
  - Henry Jocelyn (1646–49)
- Edward Godfrey (1649–52)
- Thomas Danforth (as president, 1680–86, 1689–92)

=== Governors and deputy governors of Lygonia ===
- Alexander Rigby (1642–52)
  - George Cleeve (1642–52)
