= Edward Godfrey (colonial governor) =

American politician

1st Governor Province of Maine
- In office 1649–1651
- Preceded by: Sir Ferdinando Gorges
- Succeeded by: Thomas Danforth

Personal details
- Born: about 1584; Wilmington, Kent, England
- Died: after 1663; Ludgate, London, England
- Spouse: Ann Merjant Godfrey
- Children: Oliver, Mary Smith, Oliver, Charles
- Profession: merchant, politician

Edward Godfrey (about 1584 – after 1663) was the first governor of the Province of Maine.

== Early life ==
Godfrey was born about 1584, the son of Oliver and Elizabeth Godfrey. He lived in Wilmington, Kent on the high road from London to Dover.

== Career ==
About 1619 he was a member of a group of merchants who loaned the Pilgrims on the Mayflower eighteen hundred pounds. He emigrated to colonial America about 1628 or 1629. While at Piscataqua (now Portsmouth, New Hampshire), in care of the fishery and fishing fleet, he was appointed on November 27, 1629, Attorney of the President and Council to take possession and deliver to Sir Ferdinando Gorges and Captain John Mason the patented grant of Laconia.

First settled as early as 1623, the southern part of Kittery was once called Champernowne's after Sir Francis Champernowne, a prominent pioneer and landowner. Nicholas Shapleigh built the first house in the area, and Edward Godfrey established a trading post in 1632.

In 1634, he was chosen as one of the referees to divide the patents of Sir Ferdinando Gorges and Captain John Mason. William Gorges, designated Governor, had Godfrey as one of his councilors.

Godfrey visited England during 1637 and 1638, during which he made a successful plea during a quo warranto trial against surrendering the Massachusetts charter. He returned with the charters for the general territory and those for the creation of Agamenticus into a municipal corporation and metropolitan of the province. In general government he was named one of the councilors and first on the list of eight aldermen for the borough, and judge of the municipal court. Under the city charter, he became mayor of Georgeana.

In July 1649, he became the first governor of the Province of Maine, and was reelected for three successive terms.

In December 1651, the charter of Massachusetts, which had been defended by Godfrey when her own representatives could not during the trial of the quo warranto writ, was interpreted to claim the heritage of Sir Ferdinando Gorges and force was used. As Governor, Godfrey drew up a letter to the English Parliament asking for protection. The town was taken by force and the citizens accepted Massachusetts, and Godfrey did so, with mental reservations, after the vote was taken.

The authorities of Massachusetts appointed him councilor of the province, but his enemies shared and divided his estate. He sailed to England to place his grievances before the courts. Living on borrowed money for years, he ended in the debtors' prison, Ludgate, London, England.

== Personal life ==
Godfrey married Ann Merjant and they had Oliver, Mary Smith, Sarah, Oliver, and Charles.

It is unknown when Godfrey died; he was buried in a pauper's unmarked grave. The last known letter from him was dated April 1663.

Government offices
Preceded by new office	Governor; 1636-1638	Vacant Title next held by Thomas Danforth
