= List of Maine land patents =

Land patents

This is a list of land patents provided by the British crown for land in what is now the state of Maine:

- Gorges-Mason Grant, 1622
- First Kennebec Patent, 1627
- Mason's Lands, 1629
- Gorges Patent, (de facto 1629; official 1639)
- Comnock's Patent, 1629
- Second Kennebec Patent (also known as the Kennebec Purchase or Plymouth Patent), 1629
- Lygonia Patent, 1630
- Muscongus Patent (also known as the Waldo Patent, and, eventually, the Bingham Purchase), 1630
- Pemaquid Patent, 1631
- Black Point Grant, 1631

== See also ==
- Province of Maine
