= Robert Gorges =

English navy officer (1525–late 1620s)

Robert Gorges (c. 1595 – late 1620s) was a captain in the Royal Navy and briefly Governor-General of New England from 1623 to 1624. He was the son of Sir Ferdinando Gorges. After having served in the Venetian wars, Gorges was given a commission as Governor-General of New England and emigrated to modern Weymouth, Massachusetts, in 1623, building his settlement on the site of the failed Wessagusset Colony.

At the time of the founding of Gorges' settlement, the English explorer Capt. Francis West was named admiral of the Plymouth Council for New England to advise him, along with another English explorer and naval Captain, Christopher Levett, who was attempting a settlement at Portland, Maine, which also later failed. Levett was named to advise Gorges as the governor of the Plymouth Colony.

The arrangement was not satisfactory. Apparently frustrated by the pace of settlement and an obdurate attitude of the new colonists towards English interference, Capt. Gorges returned to England in the spring of 1624. Several of his settlers turned up later at the house Levett had built on what is today House Island in Casco Bay, Maine. Gorges died sometime in the 1620s; his brother John had taken over the Gorges claims by 1629.

== Bibliography ==
- Jack Dwyer: Dorset Pioneers: The History Press: 2009: ISBN 978-0-7524-5346-0
- Bradford, William. History of Plymouth Plantation, 1620–1647, Vol. I, The Massachusetts Historical Society, Boston, Mass., 1912
