= Lygonia =

Pre-colonial Mains Province

Lygonia was a proprietary province in pre-colonial Maine, created through a grant from the Plymouth Council for New England in 1630 to lands then under control of Sir Ferdinando Gorges. The province was named for his mother, Cicely (Lygon) Gorges. It was one of the early provinces of Maine and was absorbed by the Massachusetts Bay Colony by 1658.

== Geography ==
Geographical interpretation of the grant's bounds is that it encompassed some 1,600 square miles (4,100 km^{2}) between Cape Porpoise and today's Kennebec River, so large that its size may have been unintended, since it took in a large part of Gorges' own grant for his Province of Maine. But it was never repudiated, and survived later challenges in English courts.

== Original grant ==
In 1630, the Plymouth Council for New England granted lands from Sir Ferdinando Gorges to the Province of Lygonia, named after his mother, Cicely (Lygon) Gorges.

The original patent establishing Lygonia has been lost, but from a 1686 abstract of title, it assigned

...unto Bryan Bincks, John Dye, John Smith & others their Associates their heirs & Assigns for Ever, Two Islands in the River Sagedahock, near the South Side thereof about 60 miles (97 km) from the Sea & also all the Tract containing 40 miles (64 km) in Length & 40 miles (64 km) in breadth upon the South side of the River Sagadahock, with all Bayes, Rivers, Ports, Inletts, Creeks, etc. together with all Royalties & Privileges within the Precincts thereof calling the same by the Name of the Province of Ligonia with power to make Laws etc.

== History ==
Assignees of the patent were members of the Plough Company of London, set up by the Council for New England to encourage settlement within the northeasterly portion of Gorges' domain. The intention was to support Gorges' scheme for permanent settlements with a mixed economy of farming and production of forest products for trade to augment the fishing enterprises already established along the Maine seaboard. The would-be settlers of the Plough Company were classified by John Winthrop as members of a small religious sect known as Familists, most of them farmers, and associated as the Company of Husbandmen. They chose as their minister Stephen Bachiler, who although himself of more Puritan leanings supported the undertaking. He and Richard Dummer, another Puritan, financed much of the expedition. They left England in 1631 on the ship Plough, but for unknown reasons failed to take possession of their Maine patent, and instead continued on to the Massachusetts Bay Colony, settling in communities there. Winthrop suggested that the group had investigated the Lygonia territory and, "not liking the place", had moved on.

The Plough Patent lay fallow until 1642, when it became known to George Cleeve, an early settler in the Portland area of Maine who had been an agent for Gorges within his Maine province. A falling-out between Gorges and Cleeve precipitated the latter's return to England, where he located Dummer, holder of the original patent, and engineered its sale to Parliamentarian Colonel Alexander Rigby in 1643. Cleeve returned to New England with both a large land grant of his own from Rigby and a commission as Deputy President of the Province of Lygonia – the unusual title from Parliament’s approval of a constitution for the new jurisdiction.

Cleeve convened a General Assembly and courts for its towns – today's Portland, Scarborough and Saco. Because its area included a large part of Gorges' Province of Maine, Lygonia's jurisdiction was vehemently protested by settlers whose deeds and titles now came under new governance and possible dispute. Cleeve's first court at Casco in 1644 was resisted with threats and arrests, and armed confrontation was narrowly avoided. Both provinces pleaded for support and assistance from Massachusetts, which however refused to align itself with either, deferring judgment to English courts. In 1647, the Puritan Parliament affirmed Rigby's contested title to Lygonia lands over Gorges' own, and the two Maine provinces coexisted with some cooperation in settling issues of overlapping jurisdiction. In 1648, a Lygonia court ratified and confirmed an administrative judgement from a Province of Maine court.

When Alexander Rigby died in 1650, Lygonia's governance continued under Cleeve without direction from England, despite the exhortations and plans, never acted on, of Rigby's son and heir Edward. In 1651 the neighboring and now-reconciled Maine provinces aligned together in a petition to Parliament, taken to England by Cleeve, asking for independence from the proprietors and membership within the English Commonwealth. This was thwarted by Massachusetts, which by now had interpreted its own boundaries as cutting across Maine at Portland, with intent to absorb both proprietorships. By 1653, the Province of Maine towns had submitted to Massachusetts jurisdiction, and although holding out until 1658, Lygonia's towns then followed suit. Following the Restoration in 1660, Ferdinando Gorges, Esq. (grandson of Sir Ferdinando) won a judgment in 1664 confirming the validity of titles he inherited to the original bounds of the Province of Maine. Cleeve and others petitioned King Charles II to declare themselves satisfied with governance under Massachusetts. In 1665, the Royal Commission for Regulating Plantations finally declared Edward Rigby's authority null and void, but because of the Massachusetts action Lygonia had already ceased to exist.

== See also ==
- List of colonial governors of Maine

== Bibliography ==
- Charles E. Banks, Colonel Alexander Rigby: Proprietor of the Plough Patent and President of the Province of Lygonia (1885). (Privately printed; Collections Maine Historical Society)
- James Phinney Baxter, George Cleeve of Casco Bay 1630-1667 (The Gorges Society, 1885).
- Mary Francis Farnham, compiler, The Farnham Papers [Extracts from Grants and Patents] 1603-1688 (Vol. VII, Documentary History of the State of Maine (Maine Historical Society, 1901).
- Maine Historical Society, Provincial and Court Records of Maine (1991).
- Gerald E. Morris, Editor, The Maine Bicentennial Atlas An Historical Survey (Maine Historical Society, 1976)
- Sybil Noyes, Charles Thornton Libby and Walter Goodwin Davis, Genealogical Dictionary of Maine and New Hampshire (Genealogical Publishing Co., Inc., 1996).
