= William Gorges =

American politician

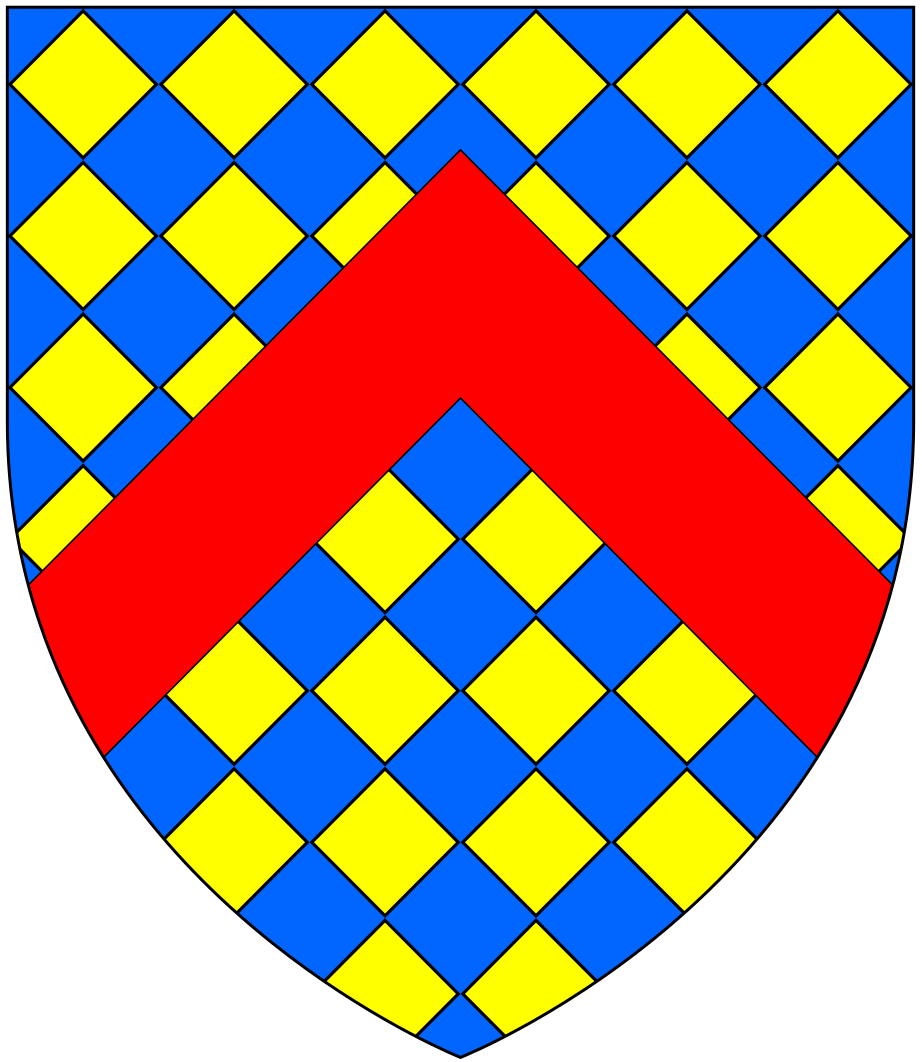
- Arms of Gorges (modern): Lozengy or and azure, a chevron gules. These arms resulted from the famous 1347 heraldry case of Warbelton v Gorges

1st Colonial governor of Maine
- In office 1636–1639
- Succeeded by: Sir Ferdinando Gorges

Personal details
- Born: January 1605 Keynsham, England
- Died: February 1658 (aged 53) Keynsham, England
- Profession: Governor

William Gorges (January 1605 – February 1658) was a soldier and the first colonial governor of the Province of Maine.

== Biography ==
=== Early years ===
Gorges was born in January 1605, the son of Sir Edward and Dorothy Speke Gorges, and nephew of Sir Edward's younger brother, Sir Ferdinando Gorges. Although he was married twice, no details are known and there are no recorded children.

=== Career ===
Gorges first served his uncle Sir Ferdinando as a lieutenant at Plymouth Fort. He was then appointed as Governor of the Province for New Somersetshire, a grant Sir Ferdinando obtained from the Plymouth Council for New England when its territories were divided up in 1635. William Gorges went to New England in 1636 with other settlers, including "craftsmen for the building of houses and erecting of saw-mills," as well as cattle for a private plantation to be established for his uncle.

William Gorges became embroiled in a dispute with George Cleeve, a cantankerous early settler, who departed for England, where he voiced his complaints to Sir Ferdinando, who then recalled his nephew in 1637. Sir Ferdinando later regretted this action, saying that Cleeve had deceived him. The result was that this effort to impose formal government and thereby further his private interests failed. Once back in England, William Gorges wrote that he had been "disappointed of my . . . voyage." What he did next is not clear.

The death of the proprietor of the province, Sir Ferdinando, occurring in 1647, and nothing being heard from Governor William Gorges, the inhabitants of Kittery, Gorgeana, Wells, and probably the Isle of Shoals, met in convention at Gorgeana, and formed themselves into a confederacy for mutual protection and just administration of the government, and Edward Godfrey, one of Governor Gorges' councilors, was chosen governor.

=== Later years ===
Gorges died in February 1658 in Keynsham, England, and the location of his interment is unknown.

Government offices
Preceded by new office	1st Colonial Governor of Maine; 1636-1638	Succeeded by Sir Ferdinando Gorges
