= Richard Vines (colonist) =

English colonial explorer

- Born: Bideford
- Resting place: Bridgetown
- Occupations: Medical doctor, explorer, factor

Richard Vines (c. 1585 – 19 April 1651) was an English colonial explorer of northern New England, and an early administrator and deputy governor of the Province of Maine.

== Life ==
Vines was born in Bideford, Devon, in about 1585, and studied medicine. He came into the employ of Sir Ferdinando Gorges, a leading organiser of the English exploration and settlement of North America. It is possible that Gorges sent him on an exploratory expedition in 1609, but the evidence for this is uncertain. In 1616, Vines went on an expedition whose purpose was to establish a "test winter settlement" on the coast of the Province of Maine. This expedition followed up on the failed Popham Colony (1607–1608) and a similar failed expedition by explorer John Smith. Vines successfully spent the winter of 1616–1617 in Maine, trading with the local Indians and further exploring its coast.

His signature appears as a witness on a document dated 1629 claiming to be a deed for the sale of land by Indians to a group of settlers led by John Wheelwright on the south side of the Piscataqua River in what is now New Hampshire. This document was alleged to be a forgery by 19th-century historian James Savage, based in part on evidence that Vines was in England at the time of the sale. In 1630, he was definitely involved in the establishment of settlements around Cape Elizabeth, as part of Gorges's efforts to establish the proprietary Province of Maine. Gorges did not receive a royal charter for the land and a commission as governor until 1639, at which time Gorges appointed his cousin Thomas as deputy governor. Thomas Gorges established the government of the colony, and in 1642 he and Vines led an exploratory expedition into the interior that reached as far as the White Mountains. Gorges returned to England in 1643 to fight in the country's Civil War. Government of the colony devolved to a council, which elected Vines deputy governor in 1644. Vines governed until 1645, during which time the colony was involved in conflicting land claims of the Lygonia territory administered by George Cleeve.

By 1646, Vines had established himself in Barbados, where he had two plantations, principally growing cotton, and also practiced medicine.

== Family ==
By 1625, he had married a woman named Joan, with whom he had four children. She outlived him by about 20 years.

== Monument ==
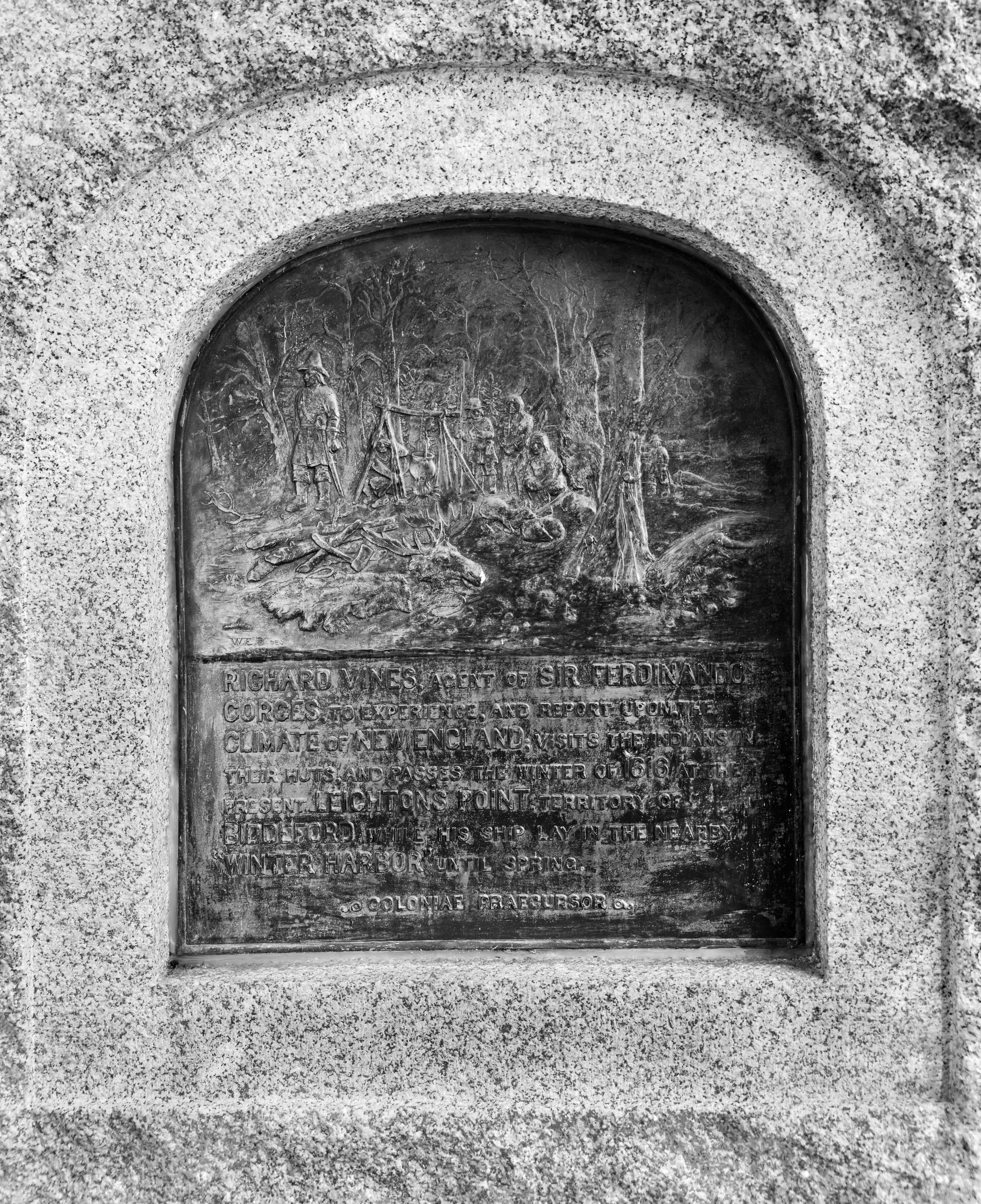
Richard Vines plaque, from a monument in Biddeford, Maine

In 1912, William E. Barry, a well-known author, artist, historian, philanthropist, and world traveler from Kennebunk, Maine, had a hobby of marking historical sites and erected a monument on the original Richard Vines property as a tribute to Vines. Barry had a large granite monument with a bronze tablet placed commemorating Vines' successful stay through his first winter 1616–1617. In 1931, Barry met with the Daughters of the American Revolution (Rebecca Emery Chapter), and offered to will the Chapter the Vines Monument, and the land where it's located, with a stipulation that the monument never be moved from its original location. The Rebecca Emery Chapter agreed and has been taking care of the monument ever since. The monument stands at 56 Bridge Road at Leighton's Point, Biddeford, Maine. The monument is on the Maine Registry of Historic Places.
