= Thomas Gorges (Maine governor) =

English lawyer and politician (1618–1670)

Deputy governor of Maine
- In office 1640–1643
- Preceded by: Sir Ferdinando Gorges
- Succeeded by: Richard Vines

Personal details
- Born: 1618
- Died: 17 October 1670 (aged 51–52) Heavitree, Exeter, England
- Spouses: Mary Sanford; Rose Mallock, née Alexander (m. 1658)
- Profession: Lawyer, politician, and governor

Thomas Gorges (1618 – 17 October 1670) was an English lawyer and politician who sat in the House of Commons between 1654 and 1660. He was a colonial governor of the Province of Maine from 1640 to 1643 and served as an officer in the Parliamentary Army during the English Civil War.

== Early life ==
Gorges was born in 1618 to Henry Gorges of Batcombe, Somerset and his wife Barbara Baynard, daughter of Thomas Baynard of Colerne, Wiltshire. He was a student of Lincoln's Inn in 1638.

== Deputy governor of Maine ==
In 1640 Gorges was selected by his distant cousin, Sir Ferdinando Gorges, to be deputy governor of the Province of Maine in New England. The province was at the time a small number of sparsely populated communities in present-day southern Maine. Thomas was a Puritan, and established friendly relations with the nearby Massachusetts Bay Colony, whose governor John Winthrop described him as "sober and well-disposed". Gorges was responsible for establishing a stable government in Maine, something his relative William had been unable to do a few years earlier. Gorges' success at governance was somewhat short-lived. He departed the province in 1643 to fight in the English Civil War, and the province was eventually absorbed into Massachusetts, which also made territorial claims to the area.

== Legal and parliamentary career ==
Upon his return to England, Gorges supported the Parliamentary cause. He resumed his law study and was called to the bar in 1649. He succeeded his father in 1649 and became a justice of the peace in the same year. In 1650, he was a lieutenant colonel in the Somerset cavalry. He was elected Member of Parliament for Taunton in 1654 for the First Protectorate Parliament. He was responsible for raising funds and materials in Somerset to support Cromwell's war with Spain. By 1655 he was recorder of Taunton. In 1656 he was re-elected MP for Taunton in the Second Protectorate Parliament and was returned again in 1659 for the Third Protectorate Parliament. He was elected for Taunton again in 1660 for the Convention Parliament. He was deprived of his recordership in 1662 when the commissioners dissolved Taunton corporation.

Gorges died at home in Heavitree, Exeter at the age of about 52, complaining "few and evil have been my days". He was buried in the local church.

== Family ==
Coat of Arms of Thomas Gorges

Gorges was twice married. He married firstly Mary Sanford, daughter of Martin Sanford of Nynehead Court, Somerset and had three sons and a daughter. He married secondly on 23 March 1658, Rose Mallock, widow of Roger Mallock of Cockington, Devon, and daughter of Sir Jerome Alexander, Justice of the Court of Common Pleas of Ireland and his wife Elizabeth Havers, with whom he had a son and daughter. She died on 14 April 1671.
