= George Cleeve =

Settler and founder of Portland, Maine

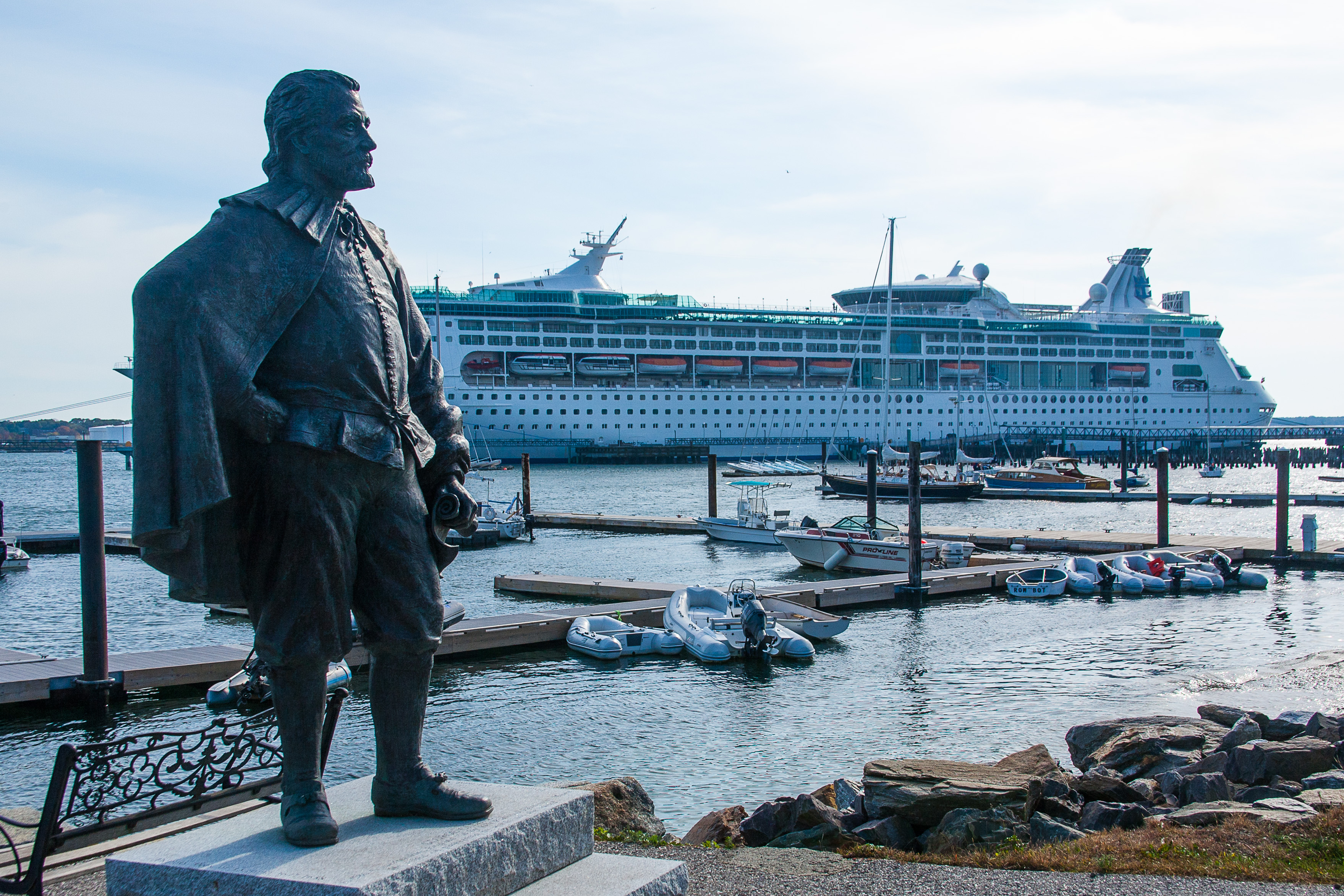
A statue of Cleeve on Portland's waterfront (2013)

George Cleeve (c. 1586–after November 1666) was an English early settler and founder of today's Portland, Maine. He was Deputy President of the Province of Lygonia from 1643 until the final submission of its Maine towns to Massachusetts authority in 1658.

== Life and career ==
Born about 1586 in Stogursey, Somersetshire, England, Cleeve emigrated to what is now New England in 1630, settling first in Spurwink, Maine (near today's Cape Elizabeth), and at Falmouth (today's Portland) in 1633. In 1637, Sir Ferdinando Gorges granted Cleeve and associate Richard Tucker 1,500 acres (6.1 km^{2}) at Machegonne (Portland Neck) that included the area of today's downtown Portland.

His career was both contentious and litigious, engaged in frequent land disputes and vying with Gorges's Province of Maine for jurisdiction over the area north of Cape Porpoise. He is known to have convened provincial courts at Casco in 1644 and Black Point in 1648.

Under Massachusetts governance of the area, he was Commissioner for Falmouth (from 1658) and Representative to the General Court, 1663–1664.

Cleeve married Joan Price on 7 September 1618. Their daughter, Elizabeth (born 1619), married in 1637 Michael Mitton.

== Death ==
Cleeve died sometime after November 1666, according to the last known record of his life. He is buried in Evergreen Cemetery in Portland.

=== Legacy ===
Portland's Cleaves Street, in the city's Bayside neighborhood, is named for Cleeve.
