= Territory of Sagadahock =

English colony in what is now eastern Maine

Coordinates: 45°N 68°W

1754 Plan of Kennebeck & Sagadahock Rivers

The Territory of Sagadahock, also called the Sagadahoc Colony and New Castle, was an English colonial territory which included the eastern part of what was later colonial Maine and was more sparsely settled than the western region. The area included was east of the Kennebec River.

On some accounts, the English first settled Sagadahoc in 1608–09.

A part of the grant of King Charles II in 1664 to his brother the Duke of York included the territory between the St Croix and Pemaquid and northward, variously called the "Sagadahoc Territory" and "New Castle". Sagadahock was administered as Cornwall County, Province of New York, except for a short-lived invasion in which Massachusetts Bay Colony created Devonshire County in 1674 and 1675.

British colonies from West Jersey to Sagadahock were incorporated into the Dominion of New England from 1686 to 1689.

In 1691, a new charter creating the Province of Massachusetts Bay was granted by William III and Mary II. This included the Province of Maine, the "territory of Sagadahoc", and also Nova Scotia. Nova Scotia was returned to France as Acadia in 1697. Maine and Sagadahock were together administered as Yorkshire County, Massachusetts and became the District of Maine in 1780 under the new Constitution of Massachusetts.

== See also ==
- Sagadahoc County, Maine
