= Council for New England =

17th-century English joint stock company

- Flag of England

- Coat of Arms of King James VI and I
- Type: Joint-stock company, Land grant, Colonial Company, Proprietary colony
- Founded: 1620; 406 years ago
- Defunct: 1635; 391 years ago
- Fate: Charter revoked in 1635
- Headquarters: Westminster
- Area served: New England
- Key people: Ferdinand Gorges

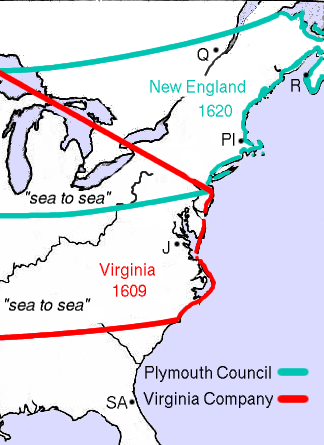
The "sea to sea" grant of Plymouth Council for New England is shown in green. The location of the Plymouth Colony settlement is demarcated as "Pl". "Q" and "R" refer to Quebec and Port Royal, which were contemporaneous French settlements.

The Council for New England was a 17th-century English joint stock company to which James I of England awarded a royal charter, with the purpose of expanding his realm over parts of North America by establishing colonial settlements.

The Council was established in November of 1620, and was disbanded (although with no apparent changes in land titles) in 1635. It provided for the establishment of the Plymouth Colony, the Province of New Hampshire, the Massachusetts Bay Colony, the New Haven Colony, and the Province of Maine.

Sir Ferdinand Gorges was a major promoter of English colonization of New England, and was a key figure in establishment and operations of the Council.

== Founding ==
Some of the persons involved had previously received a charter in 1606 as the Plymouth Company and had founded the short-lived Popham Colony within the territory of northern Virginia (actually in present-day Maine in the United States). The company had fallen into disuse following the abandonment of the 1607 colony.

The Council was re-established, with support from Gorges, after (1) Captain John Smith had completed a thorough survey of the Atlantic side of New England (and named it such), (2) Richard Vines over-wintered in 1616, off the Maine coast and discovered that a plague was decimating Native Americans and (3) a friendly English speaking local Native American had been placed in the most likely colonization spot.

In the new 1620 charter granted by James I, the company was given rights of settlement in the area now designated as New England, which was the land previously part of the Virginia Colony north of the 40th parallel, and extending to the 48th parallel.

== 1620 Charter ==
The Charter of 1620 mentions the wish of certain settlers for English colonization of all land between degrees 34 and 45, but instead provides for colonization between degrees 40 and 48. The colonial plantation was to found settlements and commerce for Christian peoples and establish trade and commerce between these new colonies and the colonies of George Somers (Bermuda) and Thomas Gates (Virginia Colony).

These new colonies were to be managed by Gentry from Plymouth, Exeter, and Bristol. These members of the Council were to have, in perpetuity for them and their descendants, rights and privileges extended for the governance and management of trade of the colony.

Individuals listed as beneficiaries of the charter include:

- Ludovic Stewart, 2nd Duke of Lennox
- George Villiers, 1st Duke of Buckingham
- William Herbert, 3rd Earl of Pembroke
- Thomas Howard, 14th Earl of Arundel
- William Alexander, 1st Earl of Stirling
- James Hamilton, 2nd Marquess of Hamilton
- Henry Wriothesley, 3rd Earl of Southampton
- Robert Rich, 2nd Earl of Warwick
- John Ramsay, 1st Earl of Holderness
- Edward la Zouche, 11th Baron Zouche
- Edmund Sheffield, 1st Baron Sheffield
- Baron Gorges of Dundalk
- Robert Carr, 1st Earl of Somerset
- Robert Mansell
- Edward Zouch
- Dudley Digges
- Thomas Roe
- Ferdinando Gorges
- Francis Popham
- John Brooke, 1st Baron Cobham
- Richard Hawkins
- Allen Apsley
- Sir Warwick Hele or Hale
- Sir Richard Catchmay
- Sir John Bourchier
- Nathaniel Rich
- Edward Giles
- Giles Mompesson
- Thomas Wroth
- Matthew Sutcliffe
- Robert Heath
- John Drake
- Raleigh Gilbert
- George Chudley
- Thomas Hamon
- John Argall

The Council would have full legal rights of governance and administration over the colonial plantation. The members of the Council would elect a President to oversee administrative affairs.

In 1622, the Plymouth Council issued a land grant to John Mason which ultimately evolved into the Province of New Hampshire.

=== 1635 revocation ===
With the establishment of the Plymouth Colony, Massachusetts Bay Colony, Province of New Hampshire, Saybrook Colony, and New Haven Colony, the council was disbanded by royal charter.
