= Province of Maine =

17th century English colonies in North America

- 1622–1691
- Flag

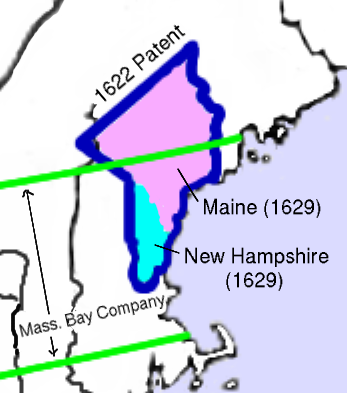
- The 1622 grant of the Province of Maine is shown outlined in blue. The 1629 division into the Province of New Hampshire (south of the Piscataqua) and the Province of Maine (north of the Piscataqua) is shown by shading. The boundaries of the Massachusetts Bay Company grant are shown in green.
- Status: Disestablished
- Religion: Anglicanism, Congregationalism
- Government: Self-governing colony
- Governor
  - 1636-1638: William Gorges (first)
  - 1689-1692: Thomas Danforth (last)
- Historical era: British colonization of the Americas; Puritan migration to New England
  - Established: 1622
  - Council for New England patent: 1622
  - Gorges Patent: 1639
  - Duke of York grants: 1664
  - Dominion of New England: 1686-1689
  - Dissolved, incorporated into Massachusetts Bay: 1691
| Succeeded by |
| Massachusetts Bay Colony; District of Maine |

The Province of Maine refers to any of the various English colonies established in the 17th century along the northeast coast of North America, within portions of the present-day U.S. states of Maine, New Hampshire, and Vermont, and the Canadian provinces of Quebec and New Brunswick. It existed through a series of land patents made by the kings of England during this era, and included New Somersetshire, Lygonia, and Falmouth (now Portland, Maine). The province was incorporated into the Massachusetts Bay Colony during the 1650s, beginning with the formation of York County, Massachusetts, which extended from the Piscataqua River (the current Maine-NH border) to just east of the mouth of the Presumpscot River in Casco Bay (just north of modern-day Portland). Eventually, its territory grew to encompass nearly all of present-day Maine.

== History ==
Historical population
| Year | Pop. | ±% |
|---|---|---|
| 1630 | 400 | — |
| 1640 | 900 | +125.0% |
| 1650 | 1,000 | +11.1% |
Source: 1630–1650;

=== 1622 patent ===
The first patent establishing the Province of Maine was granted on 10 August 1622 to Sir Ferdinando Gorges and John Mason by the Plymouth Council for New England, which itself had been granted a royal patent by James I to the coast of North America between the 40th to the 48th parallel "from sea to sea". This first patent encompassed the coast between the Merrimack and Kennebec rivers, and an irregular parcel of land between the headwaters of the two rivers. In 1629, Gorges and Mason agreed to split the patent at the Piscataqua River, with Mason retaining the land south of the river as the Province of New Hampshire.

Gorges named his more northerly piece of territory New Somersetshire after his home county of Somerset in England. Lack of funding and the absence of a royal charter held back development, and only a few small settlements were established. Gorges sought to create a neo-feudal community similar to western England. The colony was Anglican and Royalist, and so sided with the king in the English Civil War (1642–1651).

=== 1639 patent ===
In 1639, Gorges obtained a renewed patent, the Gorges Patent, for the area between the Piscataqua and Kennebec Rivers, in the form of a royal charter from Charles I of England. The area was roughly the same as that covered in the 1622 patent after the 1629 split with Mason. This renewed colonization effort was also hampered by lack of money and settlers, but continued to survive even after the death of Gorges in 1647.

=== Absorption by Massachusetts ===
Beginning in the 1640s, the nearby Massachusetts Bay Colony began claiming territories north of the Merrimack River, because the Merrimack's northernmost point was farther north than its mouth. This resulted in its administration of the early settlements of what later became New Hampshire. After a survey made in the early 1650s, Massachusetts extended its land claims as far north as Casco Bay. By 1658, Massachusetts had completed the assimilation of all of Gorges' original territory into its jurisdiction.

=== Duke of York Grant ===
In 1664, Charles II of England made a grant to his brother, James, Duke of York for territories north and east of the Kennebec River. This territory was part of Acadia, but had been conquered by the Massachusetts Bay Colony. He also sent over the Royal Commission of 1664 to formally establish the grant. Under the terms of this patent the territory was incorporated into Cornwall County, part of the duke's proprietary Province of New York. The territory stipulated in this charter encompassed the areas between the Kennebec and St. Croix Rivers. This region, which had previously been called the Territory of Sagadahock, forms the eastern portion of the present-day state of Maine. Charles had intended to include the former Gorges territory in this grant, but the Gorges heirs instead chose to sell their remaining claims to Massachusetts.

=== Brief Independence ===
The same 1664 Cartwright Commission voided Massachusetts' claim to Maine and in 1665, the commissioners set up an independent proprietary government based in Wells, Maine.

When the commissioners left New England in 1668, John Leverett led a counter-coup against the government established in Maine by them in order to reassert Massachusetts authority. On July 14, 1668 he, Richard Waldron, Edward Tyng, Robert Pike and 12 cavalrymen rode into York, Maine and deposed the officials and swore in new military officers and court officials.

=== King Philip's War ===
In 1674-75, the region between the Kennebec River and Penobscot Bay was administered as Devonshire County, District of Maine, Massachusetts Bay Colony, overlapping the New York claim. Starting in 1675, King Philip's War resulted in the abandonment of this area by English settlers until the 18th century.

=== Latter 17th Century ===
In 1679, King Charles II severed Norfolk County from Massachusetts. Several prominent Royalists hoped to gain independence from Massachusetts. New Hampshire governor, Edward Cranfield petitioned the Privy Council suggesting Maine be added to New Hampshire.

In 1691, William III and Mary II issued a charter for the new Province of Massachusetts Bay that encompassed (in addition to other territories) the former claims of the Massachusetts Bay Colony, and those of the Duke of York. The region became York County, Massachusetts and then the District of Maine, part of Massachusetts until it achieved statehood of its own in 1820.

== Government ==
The government varied based on the time period and the part of Maine. York County, Massachusetts was very influenced by Puritan New England. Kittery, Maine sent deputies to the Massachusetts General Court.

== Boundaries ==
The land west of the Penobscott River had been called Maine since the beginning of colonization. The US State of Maine consists of land that was claimed by other nations with different names at various times during the 17th and 18th centuries.

== French and Indian Wars ==
Maine was a battleground for much of the 17th and 18th centuries. King Philip's War, King William's War, Queen Anne's War, Father Rale's War, and King George's War all had battles in Maine.

The land in Maine east of the Kennebec River was part of Acadia and there were battles of the Acadian Civil War.

== See also ==
- History of Maine
- List of Maine land patents
- List of colonial governors of Maine
