= Ferdinando Gorges =

English military commander (d. 1647)

Sir Ferdinando Gorges
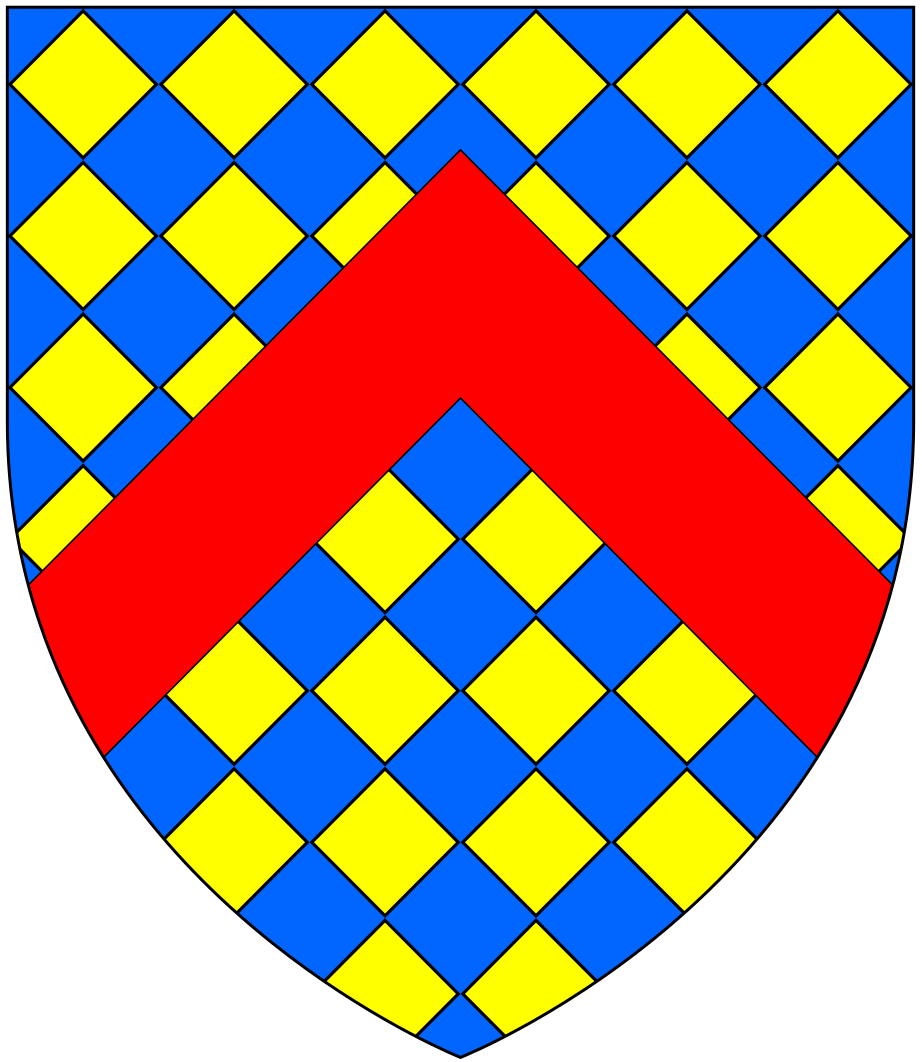
- Arms of Gorges (modern): Lozengy or and azure, a chevron gules. These arms resulted from the famous 1347 heraldry case of Warbelton v Gorges

2nd colonial governor of Maine
- In office 1639 – 24 May 1647
- Preceded by: William Gorges
- Succeeded by: Thomas Gorges

Personal details
- Born: c. 1565-1568 Clerkenwell, Middlesex, England
- Died: 24 May 1647 (aged 78–82) Ashton Phillips, Somerset, England
- Spouse(s): Ann Bell (died 1620); 4 children. Mary Fulford {Mrs Achims (a widow)} Elizabeth Gorges, {Mrs Courteney (a widow)} Elizabeth Gorges {Lady Smyth (a widow)}
- Profession: Governor, entrepreneur and founder of the Province of Maine

Sir Ferdinando Gorges (c. 1565–1568 – 24 May 1647) was a naval and military commander and governor of the important port of Plymouth in England. He was involved in Essex's Rebellion against the Queen, but escaped punishment by testifying against the main conspirators. His early involvement in English trade with and settlement of North America as well as his efforts in founding the Province of Maine in 1622 earned him the title of the "Father of English Colonization in North America," even though Gorges himself never set foot in the New World.

== Origins ==
Ferdinando Gorges was born between 1565 and 1568, (Note: Sources vary on his birth date. His first biographer, James Phinney Baxter, sets his birth as shortly after the death of his father on 29 August 1568. This year is also used by Hasler's 1981 History of Parliament, which relies principally on a family history. Miller Christy, who examined English colonizing records, although not the Gorges family papers, suggests that his birth was around 1566, a year also used by the 1890 Dictionary of National Biography and followed by the online Encyclopædia Britannica. William Retlaw Williams has his birth year as 1584.) probably in Clerkenwell, in Middlesex where the family maintained their London town house, but possibly at the family's manor of Wraxall, in Somerset. (Note: No records of Ferdinando's birth or christening have survived. The registers of St. James, Clerkenwell, are imperfect and in disarray. And given that the Gorges family carefully recorded births, marriages and deaths in their ancient parish church in Wraxall, the fact that no record of Ferdinando's birth exists there suggested to Baxter that he was born in Clerkenwell.) He was the second son of Edward Gorges of Wraxall, by his wife Cicely Lygon. The circumstances of his father's death aged 31 suggested to Baxter (Gorges's first biographer) that Ferdinando was born at about the time of his father's death on 29 August 1568. Edward Gorges, however, evidently realizing that his illness was fatal, prepared his will on 10 August 1568, (and proved on 17 September of the same year) in which Edward bequeathed to Ferdinando a 23-ounce gold watch and devised to him the manor of Birdcombe, Wraxall, for a term of 24 years. The terms of the testamentary gifts led an earlier memorialist to conclude that Ferdinando had been born sometime between 1565 and 1567.

=== Ancestry ===
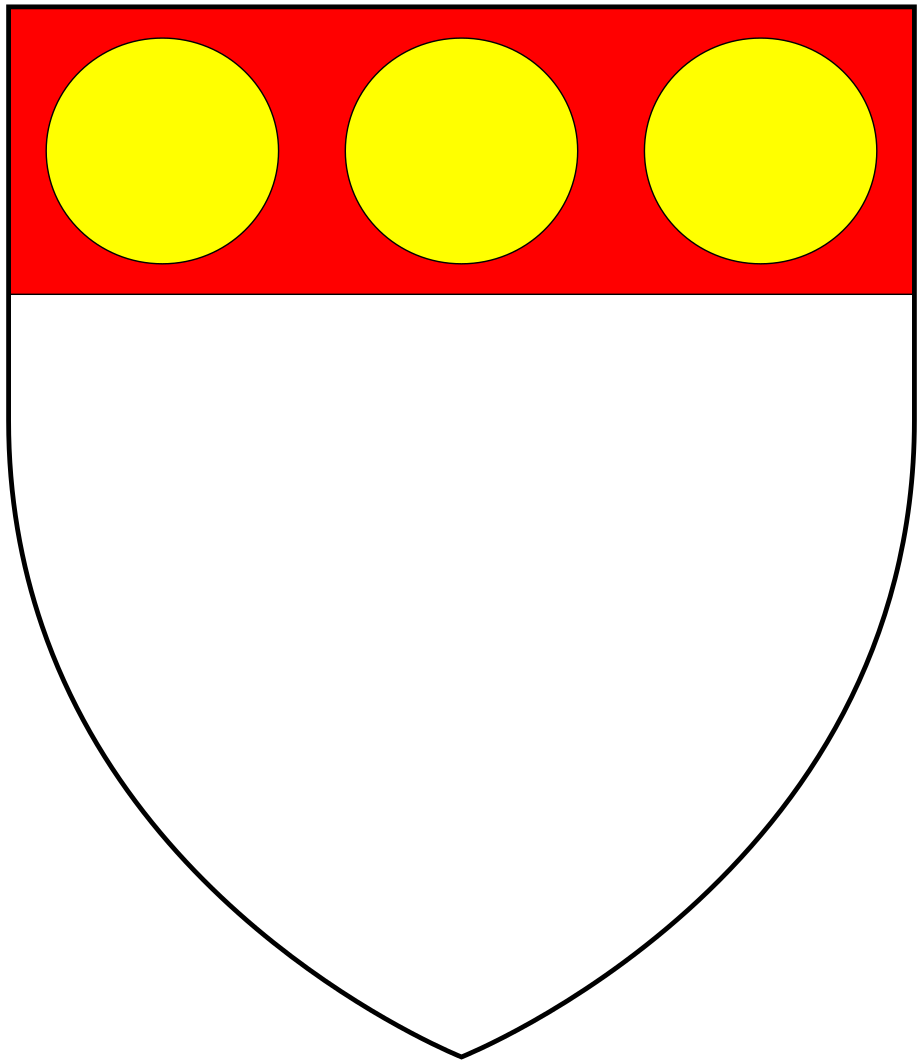
Arms of Russell of Kingston Russell & Dyrham: Argent, on a chief gules three bezants

Ferdinando Gorges was by blood in the male line a member of the Russell family of Kingston Russell, Dorset and of Dyrham in Gloucestershire, an early member of which was Sir John Russell (died c. 1224) of Kingston Russell, a household knight of King John (1199–1216), and of the young King Henry III (1216–1272), to whom he also acted as steward. However, the last male of the ancient Anglo-Norman Gorges family, about to die childless, bequeathed his estates, including Wraxall, to Theobald Russell, a younger son of his sister Eleanor Russell, on condition that he should adopt the name and arms of Gorges. Ferdinando was a descendant of this Theobald Russell "Gorges".

Canting arms of Gorges (ancient): Argent, a gurges azure (gurges being Latin for a whirlpool)

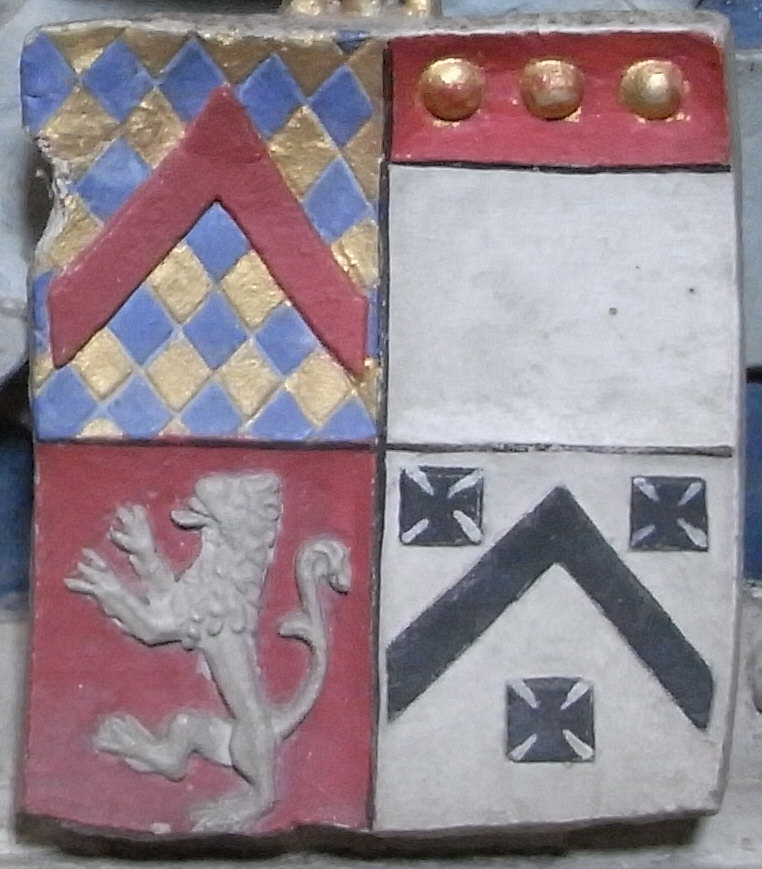
Quartered arms of Gorges on the chest-tomb of Sir Edmund Gorges (d. 1512) and his wife Lady Anne Howard, showing Gorges (modern) and Russell, All Saints’ Church, Wraxall, Somerset

The Gorges family arrived in England with the Norman Conquest. (Note: Baxter says that the Gorges family take their name from a hamlet in Lower Normandy near Carentan. From thence Ranolph de Gorges accompanied the Norman conquerors in 1066.) The male line of the Gorges family died out in 1331 on the death of Ralph de Gorges, 2nd Baron Gorges (d.1331), of Knighton, Isle of Wight. They were said to have lived in Somersetshire from the time of King Henry I and held their estates in Wraxall since the time of King Edward II. The Gorges were recipients of many royal appointments and privileges since Edward's time.

Ferdinando's great-great-grandfather married the eldest daughter of John Howard, 1st Duke of Norfolk, from which connection they claim royal descent. Ferdinando's father Edward Gorges, as first born, became the heir of the family estate in Wraxal when his father died in 1558 when he was 21. Notwithstanding the family tradition in royal offices, neither Edward nor his father Edmund took part in public affairs (the early deaths of both of them may have been a partial explanation).

Ferdinando's mother was Cecily Lygon, a daughter of William Lygon of Madresfield, Worcestershire, (whose ancestors' connection with the throne could be traced back to King Richard II), and his wife Eleanor Denys, a daughter of Sir William Denys of Dyrham, High Sheriff of Gloucestershire, whose family was the heir of the Russells of Dyrham, a descendant of which family in a direct male line was Ferdinando Gorges. Among their descendants were the Earls Beauchamp. Ferdinando Gorges was named after his mother's brother, Ferdinando Lygon. After the death of Edward Gorges, Cecily married John Vivian of Brydges.

Ferdinando's only sibling was his older brother Edward, who was baptised at Wraxall on 5 September 1564. Edward entered Hart Hall, Oxford, in 1582.

== Early life and education ==
Very little documentation exists regarding his early life and education. He was brought up at Nailsea Court at Kenn near Wraxall. Although as far as is known Ferdinando had no direct connection with the Court in his youth, he could not have been impervious to two great cultural currents of the time: the growing resistance to the absolute power of the monarchy, particularly in ecclesiastical matter, sometimes subsumed under the concept of "Puritanism", and the beginnings of English exploration and exploitation of the Western Hemisphere, the latter especially owing to his distant family connections with Humphrey Gilbert and his half-brother Walter Raleigh.

== Military career ==
No documentary evidence records Gorges's activities before 1587 (when he was around 20), but because in that year he is referred to as a captain, it is probable that he took up the profession of arms several years before then, perhaps in his mid-teens (not uncommon in England at the time). It is likely that he was engaged in active duty shortly after the outbreak of the Anglo-Spanish War in 1585.

In 1587, he was one of the "several eminent chieftains" commanding the 800 soldiers sent from Flushing by Sir William Russell to aid the Earl of Leicester's attempt to relieve the Siege of Sluis laid by the Spanish Governor General of the Netherlands, whose revolt against the Spanish Habsburg rule England had pledged to aid. Gorges fought under the command of Lord Willoughby, whose family he developed a close connection with. (Note: In 1634 Gorges named Robert Bertie, the Baron's son and by then First Earl of Lindsey, as beneficiary of one of his proprietary colonies in the New World.)

It is unknown whether he was captured during that engagement or later, but by September 1588 he was listed as among the prisoners at Lisle, for his name is among those English prisoners who friends in England petitioned to have Spanish prisoner exchanged for. In 1589 Gorges was wounded at the siege of Paris. He was knighted at the siege of Rouen in 1591. He was rewarded for his services by the post of Governor of the Fort at Plymouth, which he held for many years.

During the Spanish Armada of 1597 Gorges was able to raise the alarm that enabled the defence of the country, but autumn storms made sure that the Spanish fleet was dispersed.

In 1601, he became involved in the Essex Conspiracy and later testified against its leader, Robert Devereux, 2nd Earl of Essex.

In 1633 he was Colonel of a regiment of Devon Trained Band Horse.

== Colonization efforts in North America ==
With the end of the Anglo-Spanish War in 1604, there was a renewed interest in colonization projects from various ports, including Bristol, with which he was closely associated. Gorges' interest in colonization was said to have been stimulated when Captain George Weymouth presented him with three captured American Indians, who later learnt English and told him about their country. According to Gorges one of these captives was Tisquantum or "Squanto" of the Patuxet, but this claim has been disputed by historians.

In 1607, as a shareholder in the Plymouth Company, he helped fund the failed Popham Colony, in present-day Phippsburg, Maine. In 1616, Gorges sent Richard Vines on an expedition to overwinter in at the mouth of the Sago River.

In 1622, Gorges received a land patent, along with John Mason, from the crown's Plymouth Council for New England for the Province of Maine, the original boundaries of which were between the Merrimack and Kennebec rivers. "Ye Province of Maine" had its birth in this charter, dated 10 August 1622, in the reign of England's King James I. A reconfirmed and enhanced 1639 charter from England's King Charles I, gave Sir Ferdinando Gorges increased powers over this new province and stated that it "shall forever hereafter, be called and named the PROVINCE OR COUNTIE OF MAINE, and not by any other name or names whatsoever..."

In 1629, he and Mason divided the colony, with Mason's portion south of the Piscataqua River becoming the Province of New Hampshire. Gorges and his nephew established Maine's first court system. Capt. Christopher Levett, early English explorer of the New England coast, was an agent for Gorges, as well as a member for the Plymouth Council for New England. Levett's attempt to establish a colony in Maine ultimately failed, and he died aboard ship returning to England after meeting with Governor John Winthrop in the Massachusetts Bay Colony in 1630.

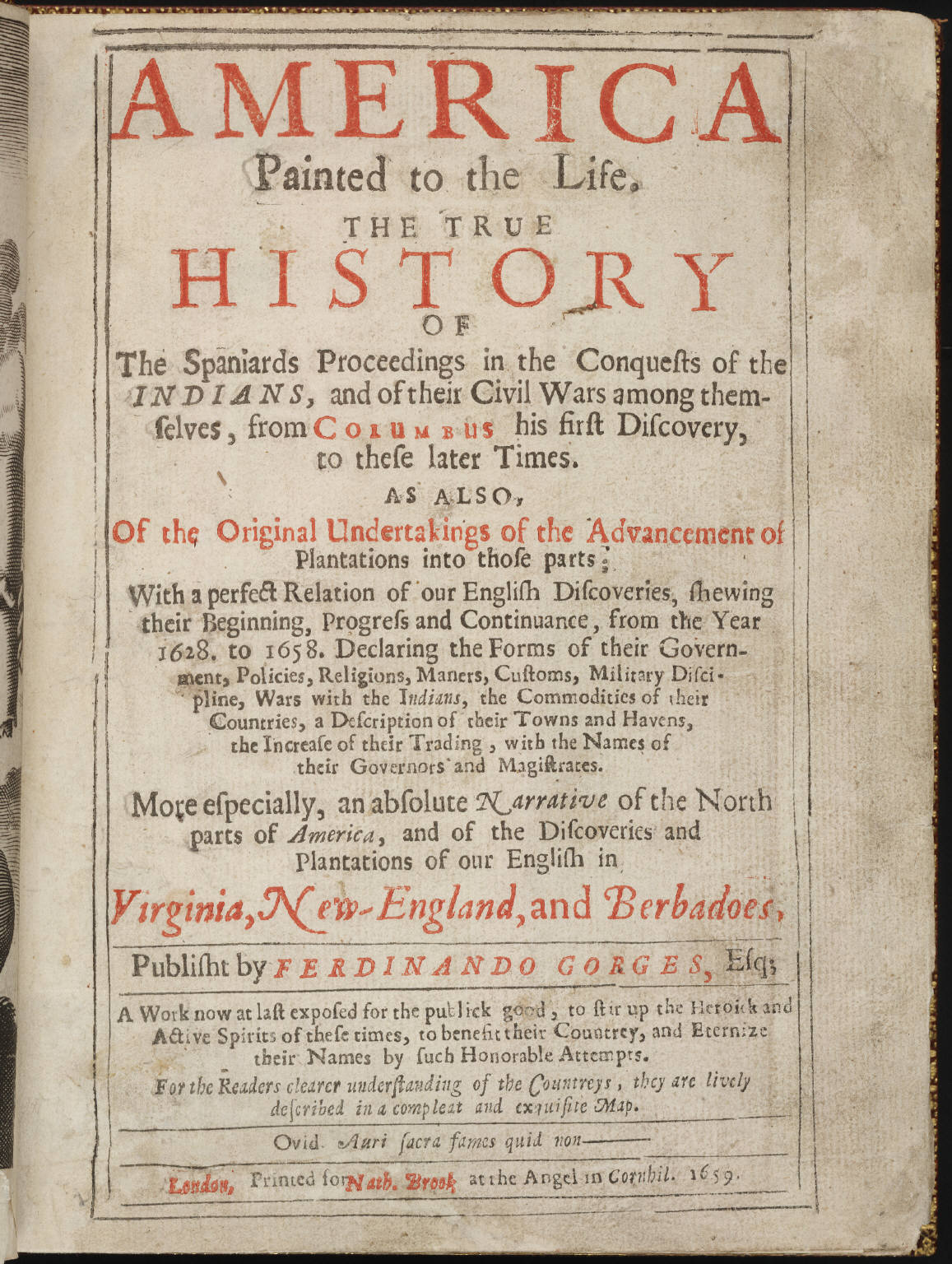
America Painted to the Life, book published in London, 1659, by Ferdinando Gorges Esq., grandson of Ferdinando Gorges

Gorges's son was Robert Gorges, Governor-General of New England from 1623 to 1624. But Robert Gorges was seen with some suspicion by American colonists, who were sceptical of Gorges' almost feudal idea of governance and settlement, and ultimately Gorges returned to England. In the 1630s Ferdinando Gorges attempted to revive the moribund claims of the Plymouth Company. In concert with colonists banished from the Massachusetts Bay Colony, he formally questioned the issuance of its royal charter in 1632, and forwarded complaints and charges made by the disaffected colonists to the Privy Council of Charles I. His efforts were ultimately unsuccessful.

== Marriages and children ==
He married four times:

- Firstly in 1589 at St. Margaret's, Westminster to Ann Bell (d. 1620) who is buried at St Sepulchre Church, Holborn, London, a daughter of Edward Bell of Writtle, Essex, by whom he had two sons and two daughters:
  - John Gorges;
  - Robert Gorges;
  - Ellen Gorges;
  - Honoria Gorges, who died young.
- Secondly in 1621, he married Mary Fulford, 3rd daughter of Sir Thomas Fulford (1553–1610) of Great Fulford in Devon, and widow of Thomas Achims (alias Asham) of Hall, in Cornwall.
- Thirdly in 1627, at Ladock in Cornwall, to Elizabeth Gorges (d. 1629), who died a few weeks after the marriage, a daughter of Tristam Gorges of St. Budeaux (a direct descendant in the male line of the Norman Gorges family) and widow firstly of Edward Courteney (d.1622) of Landrake and of Trethurffe, Ladock, both in Cornwall (descended from the Courtenay Earls of Devon), and secondly of William Bligh.
- Fourthly, at Wraxall in 1629, to Elizabeth Gorges, Lady Smyth, widow of Sir Hugh Smyth of Ashton Court (near Wraxall) and daughter of Sir Thomas Gorges and Helena, Marchioness of Northampton.

== Death and succession ==
Sir Ferdinando Gorges died on 24 May 1647, at his wife's home in Long Ashton (then known as Ashton-Phillips), and is buried in the Smyth crypt, All Saint's Church, Long Ashton, without markings due to the circumstances of the time. His eldest son, John, inherited his Province of Maine, of which Robert, his younger son, had been for such a short time Governor.

In May 1677, his grandson Ferdinando Gorges sold all his rights to Maine to the state of Massachusetts for £1,250. This sale finally extinguished the interests of the Gorges family in the New World and ended Gorges' ambition of creating an independent proprietary colony in Maine. It was not until 1820 that Maine achieved separate statehood.

== See also ==
- Fort Gorges

== Notes, references and sources ==
=== Sources ===
- Baxter, James Phinney (1890). Sir Ferdinando Gorges and his Province of Maine. Boston: Prince Society. In three volumes, online, at archive.org, as follows: Volume 1 consists of Baxter's memoir of Sir Ferdinando Gorges and A briefe relation of the discovery and plantation of New England … (London: J. Haviland for W. Bladen, 1622). Volume 2 includes A briefe narration of the original undertakings of the advancement of plantation into the parts of American… by … Sir Ferdinando Gorges … (London: E. Brudenell, for N. Brook, 1658) as well as other works of Gorges and his son Thomas Gorges. Volume 3 is devoted to Gorges's letters and other papers, 1596–1646.
- Brown, Frederick (1875). The Pedigree of Ferdinando Gorges. Boston: Reprinted for private distribution from The Historical and Genealogical Register (January 1875). The original article is Brown, Frederick (January 1875). "The Gorges Family". New England Historical and Genealogical Register. 29: 44–47. ISBN 9780788401954.
- Christy, Miller (July 1899). "Attempts toward Colonization: The Council for New England and the Merchant Venturers of Bristol, 1621-1623". American Historical Review. 4 (4): 678–702, at 683.
- Clark, Charles E. (1970). The Eastern Frontier: The Settlement of Northern New England, 1610-1763. New York: Knopf. LCCN 78111231.
- Gorges, Raymond; Brown, Frederick (1944). The Story of a Family Through Eleven Centuries, Illustrated by Portraits and Pedigrees: Being a History of the Family of Gorges. Boston: Privately printed [D. B. Updike, the Merrymount Press].
- Hasler, P.W., ed. (1981). "Gorges, Sir Ferdinando (c.1568-1647), of Plymouth, Devon; later of Ashton Phillips, Som.". House of Commons, 1558-1603. London: H.M.S.O for the History of Parliament Trust.
- Laughton, John Knox (1890). "Gorges, Ferdinando" . In Stephen, Leslie; Lee, Sidney (eds.). Dictionary of National Biography. Vol. 22. London: Smith, Elder & Co. pp. 241–243.
- MacInnes, C. M. (1965).Ferdinando Gorges and New England (Bristol Historical Association pamphlets, no. 12), 26 pp.
- Major, Minor Wallace (Fall 1970). "William Bradford versus Thomas Morton". Early American Literature. 5 (2): 1–13. JSTOR 25070464.
- Pearson, John C. (October 1943). "The Fish and Fisheries of Colonial Virginia". William and Mary Quarterly. 23 (4): 435–39. doi:10.2307/1923194. JSTOR 1923194.
- Preston, Richard A. (October 1939). "Fishing and Plantation". American Historical Review. 45 (1): 29–43. doi:10.2307/1905047. JSTOR 1905047.
- Preston, Richard A. (1953). Gorges of Plymouth Fort: A Life of Sir Ferdinando Gorges, Captain of Plymouth Fort, Governor of New England, and Lord of the Province of Maine. Toronto: University of Toronto Press.
- Richardson, Douglas; Everingham, Kimball G. (2011). Plantagenet Ancestry: A Study in Colonial and Medieval Families (2nd ed.). n.p.: Create Space. ISBN 978-1461045137.
- Smith, Bradford (July 1954). "[Review:] Gorges of Plymouth Port: A Life of Sir Ferdinando Gorges, Captain of Plymouth Fort, Governor of New England, and Lord of the Province of Maine by Richard Arthur Preston". William and Mary Quarterly. 11 (3): 468–70. doi:10.2307/1943320. JSTOR 1943320.
- Thayer, Henry Otis (1892). The Sagadahoc Colony: Comprising the Relation of a Voyage Into New England. Portland, Maine: Gorges Society.
- Williams, William Retlaw (1895). The Parliamentary History of the Principality of Wales, from the Earliest Times to the Present …. London: Priv. print. for the author by E. Davies and Bell.
