= Pentagoet Archeological District =

Historic district in Maine, United States

- U.S. National Register of Historic Places
- U.S. National Historic Landmark District
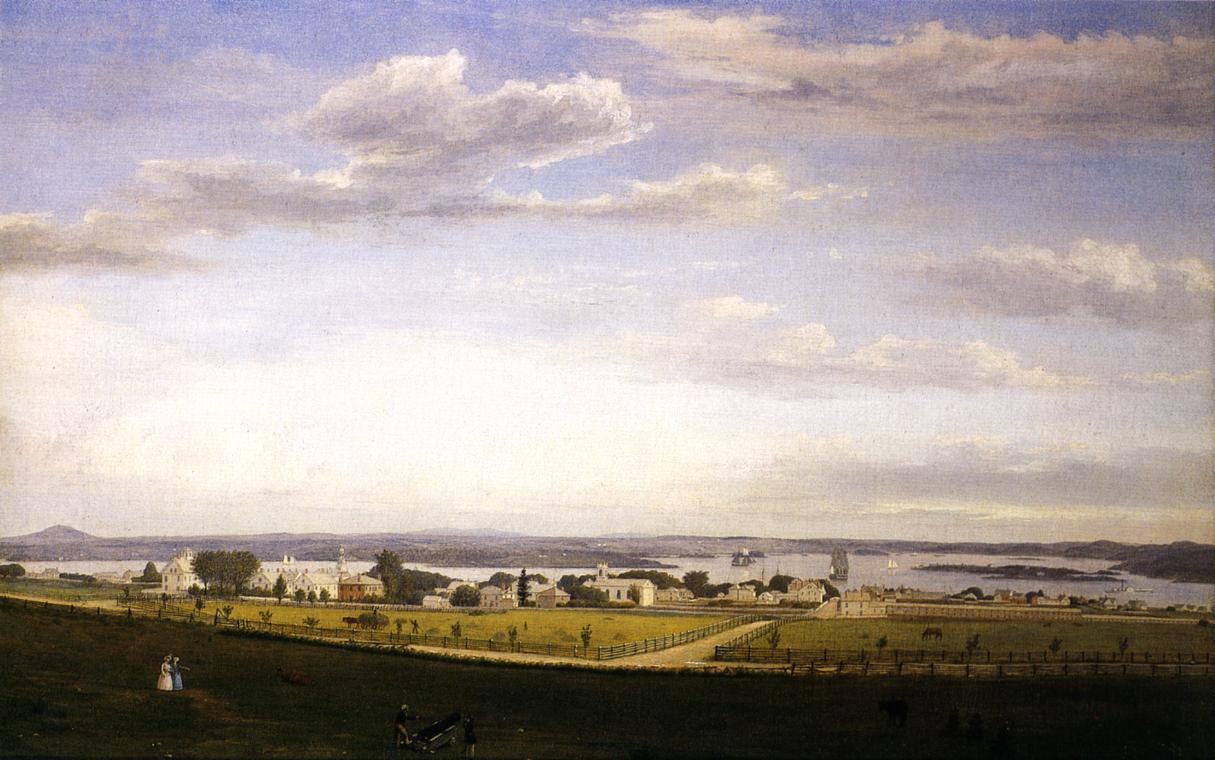

- Location within Maine Location within the United States
- Location: Castine, Maine
- Coordinates: 44°23′5″N 68°48′13″W
- Built: 1629
- NRHP reference No.: 93000603

Significant dates
- Added to NRHP: April 12, 1993
- Designated NHLD: April 12, 1993

The Pentagoet Archeological District is a National Historic Landmark District located at the southern edge of the Bagaduce Peninsula in Castine, Maine. It is the site of Fort Pentagoet, a 17th-century fortified trading post established by fur traders of French Acadia. From 1635 to 1654 this site was a center of trade with the local Abenaki, and marked the effective western border of Acadia with New England. From 1654 to 1670 the site was under English control, after which it was returned to France by the Treaty of Breda. The fort was destroyed in 1674 by Dutch raiders. The site was designated a National Historic Landmark in 1993. It is now a public park.

== History ==
This district forms part of the traditional homeland of the Abenaki Indians, in particular the Penobscot tribe. The location at the tip of the Bagaduce Peninsula, where the Bagaduce River enters Penobscot Bay, was where Claude de Saint-Etienne de la Tour established a small trading post to conduct business with the Tarrantine Indians (now called the Penobscots). The site was later seized by Englishmen from the Plymouth Colony, who operated there from 1629 to 1635. The territory was returned to France as part of the 1632 Treaty of Saint-Germain-en-Laye, and in 1635 the fortified trading post was established by Charles de Menou d'Aulnay. Abenakis frequented the fortified trading post, bartering moosehides, sealskins, beaver and other furs in exchange for European commodities.

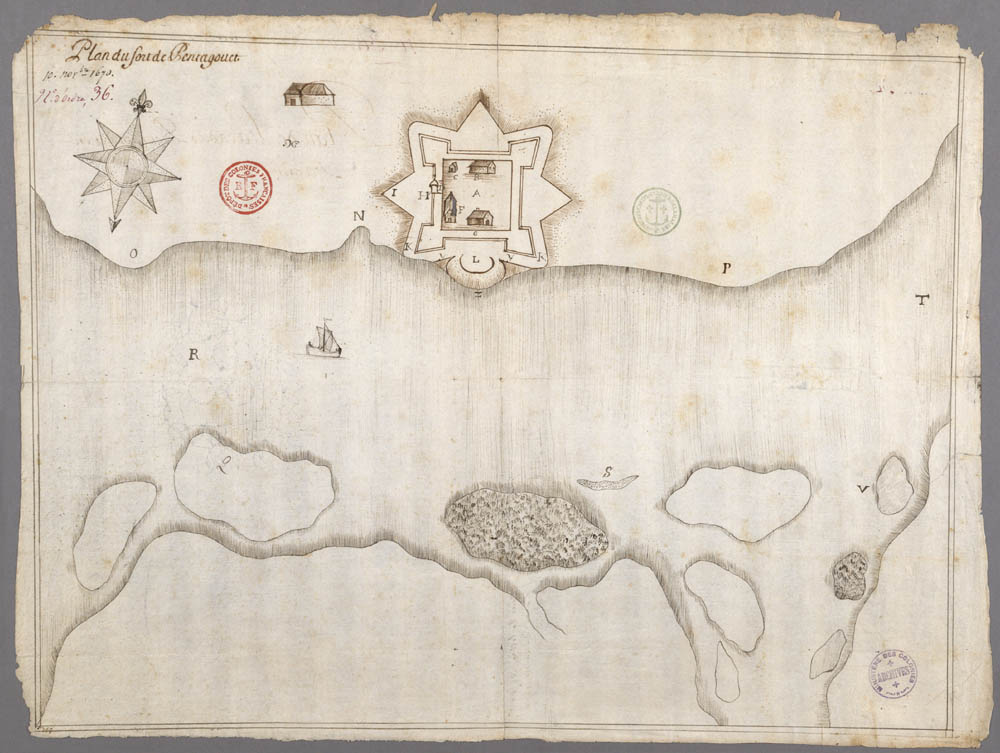
Fort Pentagoet in 1670

d'Aulnay contested the fur trade with Claude de la Tour's son Charles in what has been called the Acadian Civil War. This conflict was won by la Tour after d'Aulnay died and la Tour married his widow. La Tour and successive French governors managed the trading post until 1654, when Acadia was seized by English forces. It remained in English hands until 1670, but the trading post apparently continued to be managed by French traders. The post was returned to France by the 1667 Treaty of Breda. In 1674 the post was completely destroyed by Dutch raiders. Subsequent resettlement of the area was long delayed, due in part to King Philip's War, a major Native American uprising in New England (1675–78).

== Archaeology ==
The location of the fort underwent a major series of excavations in the early 1980s, in which about half the inner compound of the fort was identified. A number of major features, including barracks, a church, a military magazine, a workshop, and what is believed to be d'Aulnay's residence, have been identified, either by direct examination or by ground-penetrating radar.

The district was designated a National Historic Landmark District and was listed on the National Register of Historic Places in 1993.

== See also ==
- List of National Historic Landmarks in Maine
- National Register of Historic Places listings in Hancock County, Maine
