= Cornelius Andreson =

Dutch pirate

Cornelius Andreson (fl. 1674–1675, last name likely also Andrieszoon) was a Dutch pirate, privateer, and soldier. He is best known for attacking English traders off Acadia and for serving in King Philip’s War.

== History ==
During the Franco-Dutch War in the 1670s the Dutch took over Acadia (the Atlantic coast of Maine and southeastern Canada) and started a colony at New Holland. The Dutch buccaneer Jurriaen Aernoutsz had ejected the French from Acadia and, on his departure, left behind a small force with privateering commissions to stop French ships and prevent the English from encroaching on New Holland. Cornelius Andreson, John Rhoades, and Peter Roderigo outfitted three small ships in late 1674 and sailed up the coast to enforce the Dutch claims.

Andreson’s ship, Penobscot Shallop, took several English vessels on charges of trespassing and illegal fur trading and was soon joined by an English ship under George Manning, who was forced to join them under threat. He looted them of their pelts, detained their captains and crews, and threatened to keep their ships as prizes before he released them. Boston merchants heard complaints from fur traders, who had been allowed free range over Acadia by paying fees to the French. They petitioned colonial officials to send a small fleet under Captain Samuel Mosely to deal with the Dutch privateers. Andreson and the others tried to engage Moseley, but when Manning switched sides, Andreson and Roderigo were heavily outgunned and surrendered.

The Dutch sailors had privateering commissions, but the colonial courts denied their validity for taking English ships and their goods and convicted them of piracy at their trial in May 1675. The Penobscot Shallop and its sister ship were given to the heirs of a Boston merchant as compensation for lost goods. The Dutch were condemned to hang but were later given a reprieve and were banished from English territories instead.

However, Andreseon would later serve alongside Mosely on the side of the English, as would Roderigo under Joshua Scottow. When King Philip’s War started in 1675, Moseley was given command of a unit largely composed of criminals, including Andreson. In scouting missions against the Wabanaki Confederacy, Andreson distinguished himself for bravery and tenaciousness and drew praise from Moseley and his superiors.

== See also ==
- Jean Baptiste Guedry (died 1726), an Acadian who, like Andreson, was tried for piracy against the English
- Admiralty court, the venue in which Andreson and the others were tried
