= Peter Roderigo =

Dutch pirate, privateer, and soldier

- Occupations: Pirate, privateer, soldier

Peter Roderigo (fl. 1674–1675, last name occasionally Oderigoe) was a Dutch pirate, privateer, and soldier. He is best known for attacking English traders off Acadia and for serving in King Philip’s War.

== History ==
Dutch buccaneer Jurriaen Aernoutsz ejected the French from Acadia alongside John Rhoades. On his departure in 1674 he left Rhoades, Cornelius Andreson, and Peter Roderigo with privateering commissions to keep out the French and prevent the English from making inroads into New Holland.

Roderigo led their group from his ship Edward and Thomas. They soon captured an English fur trader named George Manning. After looting his ship and threatening to maroon him, they allowed him to keep his ship if he would sail alongside them under the Dutch flag. The flotilla stopped a number of other ships, looting them of pelts and furs and threatening the sailors.

English sailors and merchants complained to local officials, who commissioned privateer and Indian fighter Samuel Mosely to sail against the Dutch. Roderigo and his fleet tried to fight Mosely’s ships but Manning immediately switched sides to aid the English; outgunned severely, the Dutch surrendered. English courts ignored the Dutch privateering commissions, which had been signed not by Prince William of Orange but by Aernoutsz himself. Most of the Dutch were convicted of piracy at trial in 1675 but all were eventually either acquitted, pardoned, or sentenced to hang but commuted to banishment instead.

Roderigo would later rejoin the English, fighting alongside Mosely’s fellow Indian fighter Joshua Scottow near Scarborough, Maine. Andreson would also join the English, fighting under Mosely against the Wabanaki Confederacy in King Philip’s War.

== See also ==
- Jean Baptiste Guedry - An Acadian who, like Andreson, was tried for piracy against the English.
- Increase Mather - Puritan minister who preached at Roderigo's trial; his son Cotton Mather would later preach at the trials of many other New England pirates.
