= Castine, Maine =

Town in Maine, United States

- Town
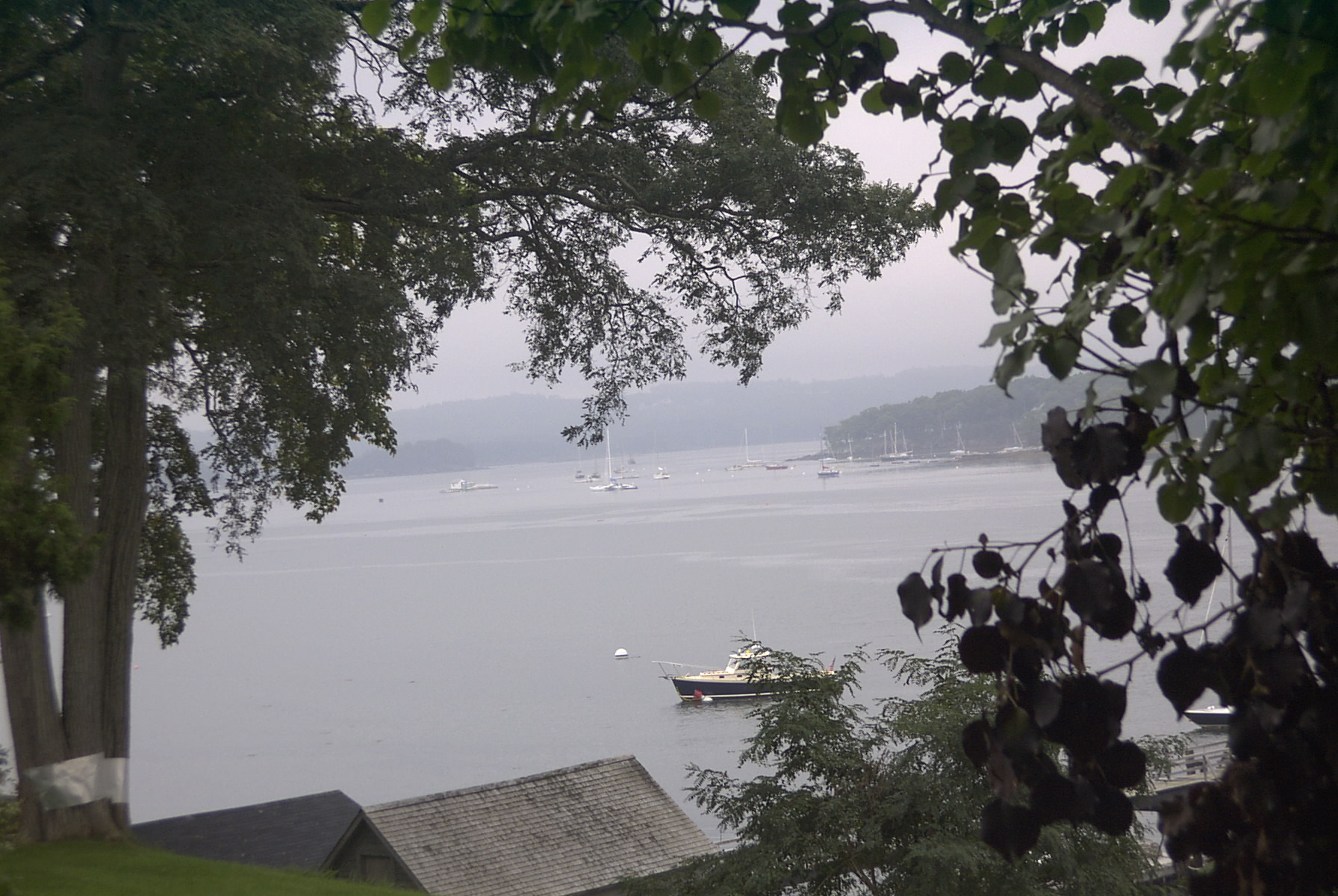
- Castine Harbor from Perkins Street

- Seal

- Location within Maine Location within the United States
- Coordinates: 44°23′31″N 68°48′58″W
- Country: United States
- State: Maine
- County: Hancock
- Founded: 1613
- Incorporated: 1796
- Villages: Castine; North Castine

Area
  - Total: 20.01 sq mi (51.83 km^{2})
  - Land: 7.78 sq mi (20.15 km^{2})
  - Water: 12.23 sq mi (31.68 km^{2})
- Elevation: 30 ft (9.1 m)

Population (2020)
  - Total: 1,320
  - Density: 170/sq mi (65.5/km^{2})
- Time zone: UTC−5 (Eastern (EST))
  - Summer (DST): UTC−4 (EDT)
- ZIP Codes: 04420–04421
- Area code: 207
- FIPS code: 23-11265
- GNIS feature ID: 582396
- Website: castine.me.us

Castine (/kæsˈtiːn/ kas-TEEN) is a town in Hancock County in eastern Maine, United States. The population was 1,320 at the 2020 census. Castine is the home of Maine Maritime Academy, a four-year institution that graduates officers and engineers for the United States Merchant Marine and marine related industries.

Called Majabigwaduce by Tarrantine Abenaki Indians, Castine is one of the oldest towns in New England, predating the Plymouth Colony by seven years. Situated on Penobscot Bay, it is near the site of historic Fort Pentagouet. Few places in New England have had a more tumultuous history than Castine, which proclaims itself the "battle line of four nations."

During the French colonial period of the 17th and early 18th century, Castine was the southern tip of Acadia, with New France defining the Kennebec River as the southern boundary of Acadia.

The town is named after Jean-Vincent d'Abbadie de Saint-Castin.

== History ==
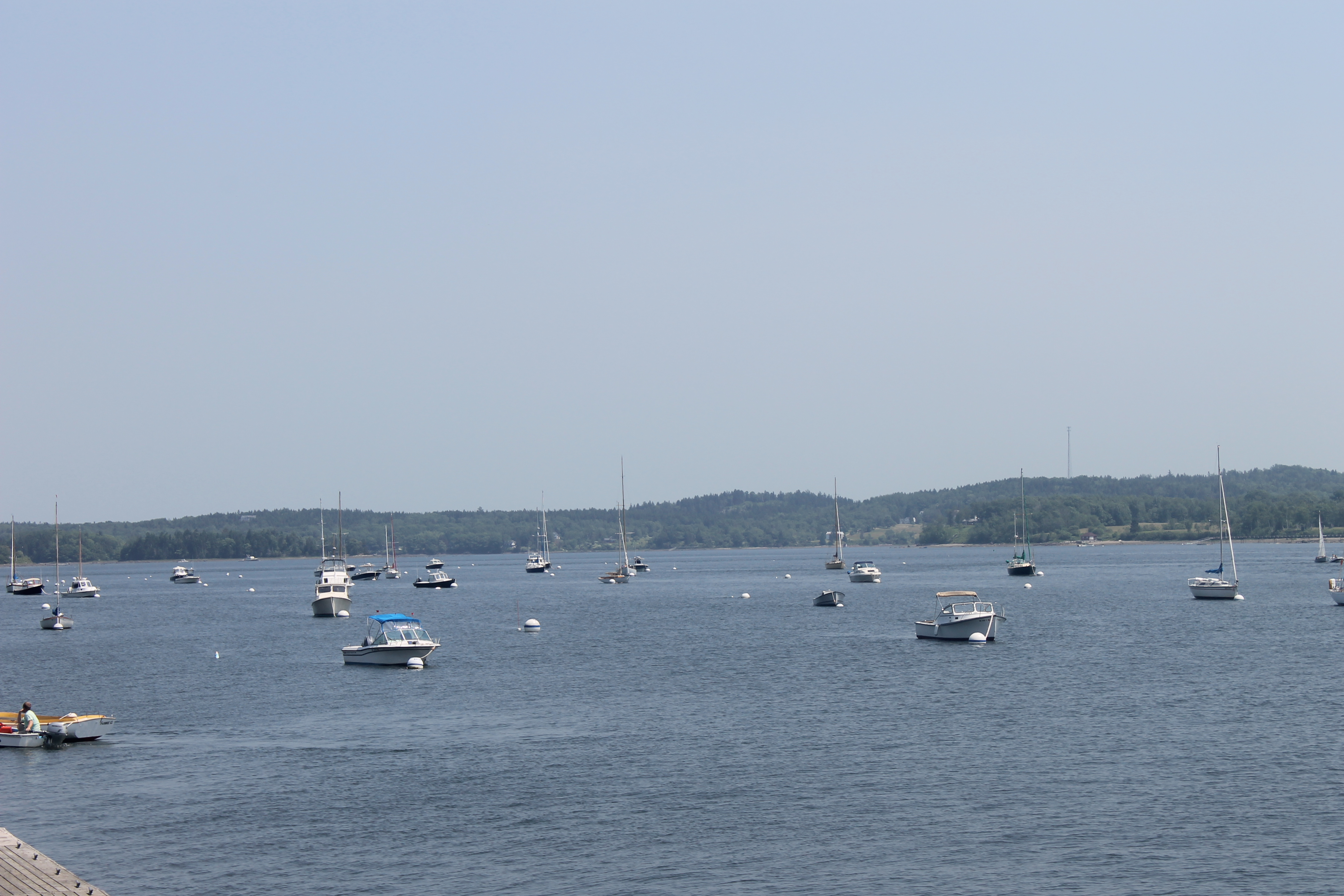
Waterfront in Castine

Its commanding position at the mouth of the Penobscot River estuary, a lucrative source of furs and timber, as well as a major transportation route into the interior, made the peninsula occupied by the present-day town of Castine of particular interest to European Colonialization in the 17th century.

Majabagaduce (as the Indian name would be corrupted) changed hands numerous times with shifting imperial politics. At one time or another, it was occupied by the French, Dutch and England's Plymouth Colony.

=== Contested territory ===
Castine was founded in the winter of 1613, when Acadian leader Claude de Saint-Étienne de la Tour established a small trading post to conduct business with the Tarrantine Indians (now called the Penobscots).

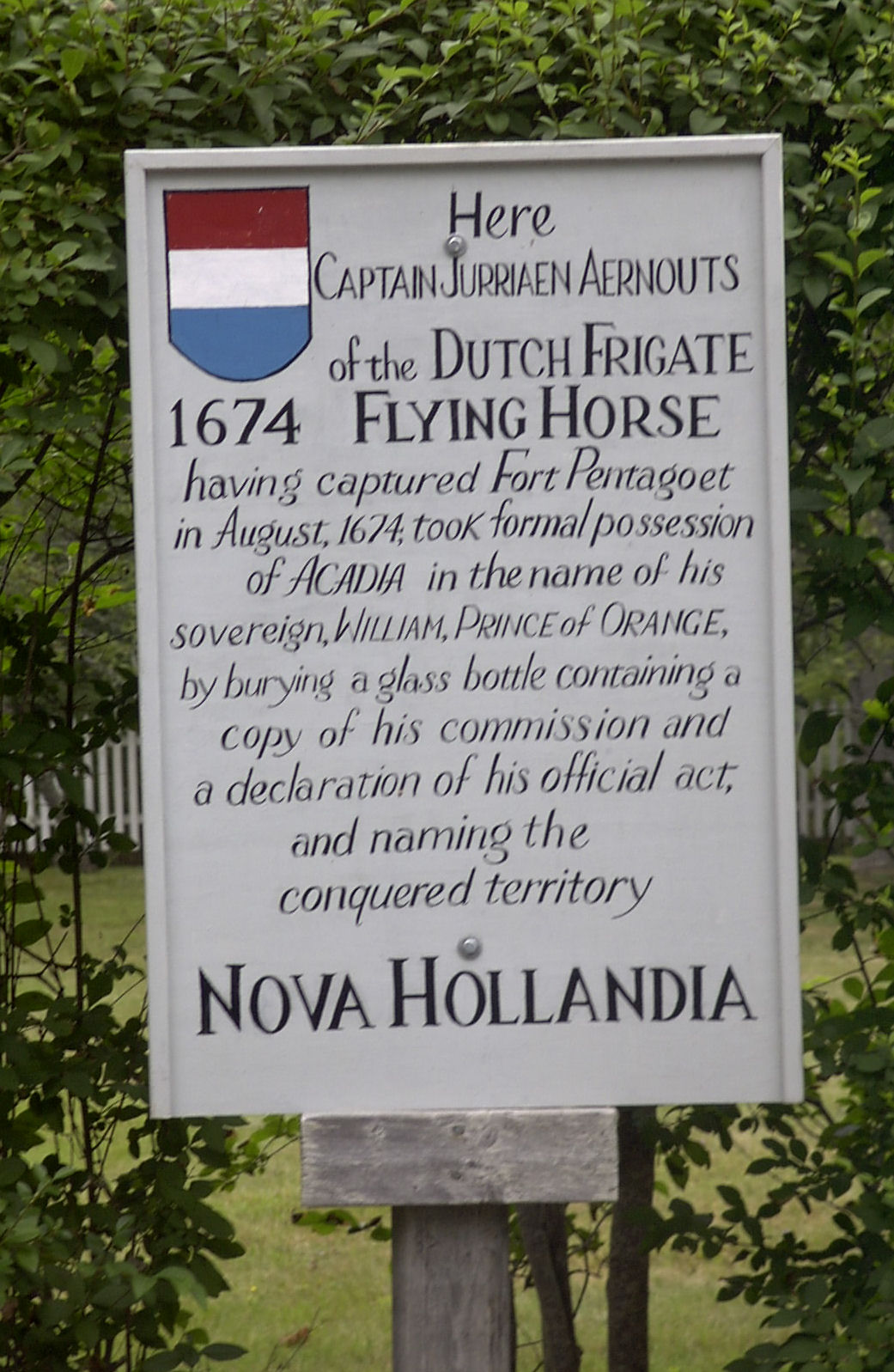
Marker commemorating the Dutch conquest of Acadia (1674), which was renamed New Holland. This is the spot where Jurriaen Aernoutsz buried a bottle at the capital of Acadia, Fort Pentagouët, Castine, Maine.

In 1613, a raid by English captain Samuel Argall at Mount Desert Island signaled the start of a long-running dispute over the boundary between French Acadia to the north and the English colonies to the south. There is evidence that de La Tour immediately challenged the English action by re-establishing his trading post in the wake of Argall's raid. Captain John Smith charted the area in 1614 and referred to French traders in the vicinity.

In 1625, Charles de la Tour erected a fort named Fort Pentagouet. English colonists from the Plymouth Colony seized it in 1628, and made it an administrative outpost of their colony. Colonial Governor William Bradford personally traveled there to claim it.

In 1635, it was retaken by the French and again incorporated into Acadia; Governor Isaac de Razilly sent Charles de Menou d'Aulnay de Charnisay to retake the village. In 1638, d'Aulnay built a more substantial fort named Fort St. Pierre.

Acadian Emmanuel Le Borgne with 100 men raided the settlement in 1653. Major General Robert Sedgwick led 100 New England volunteers and 200 of Oliver Cromwell's soldiers on an expedition against Acadia in 1654. Before taking its capital Port Royal, Sedgwick captured and plundered the French settlement at Pentagouêt. The English occupied Acadia for the next 16 years.

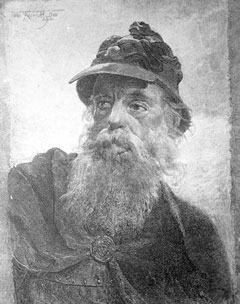
Baron Jean-Vincent de Saint-Castin

In 1667, after the Treaty of Breda brought peace, French authorities dispatched the Baron Jean-Vincent de Saint-Castin to take command of Pentagouêt. The baron married an Abenaki woman, the daughter of the sachem Modockawando. She adopted the French name Mathilde and bore him 10 children. The baron became a widower and then married another Abenaki woman named Marie Pidiwammiskwa who bore him two additional children. Castine soon became a force in colonial trade and diplomacy.

Castine served as the Acadian regional capital between 1670 and 1674.

During the Franco-Dutch War (1674), Pentagouët and other Acadian ports were captured by the Dutch captain Jurriaen Aernoutsz who arrived from New Amsterdam, renaming Acadia, New Holland. The Dutch turned the fort's cannon on its own walls and destroyed most of it after the second siege. Saint-Castin himself retook it in 1676 and renamed the town Bagaduce, a shortened version of Majabigwaduce.

During King William's War, Saint-Castin's settlement was plundered by English Governor Sir Edmund Andros in 1688. In response, Saint-Castin led an Abenaki war party to raid the English settlement at Pemaquid (present-day Bristol, Maine) in August 1689. In 1692 the village was again seized by the English, when Major Benjamin Church destroyed the fort and looted the settlement. With the return of Baron de Saint-Castin and his sons to France, the settlement became sparsely occupied.

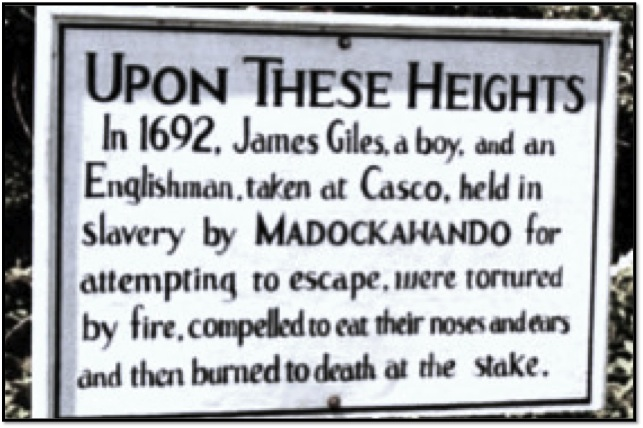
Sign at site of death of John Gyles' brother, Dyce Head Lighthouse Rd., Castine, Maine

During Queen Anne's War, in response to the French Raid on Deerfield in February 1704, New England Colonel Benjamin Church raided Saint-Castin's settlement (then known as Penobscot) before moving on to raid the Acadian villages at present-day St. Stephen, New Brunswick, Grand Pré, Pisiguit (present-day Windsor, Nova Scotia), and Chignecto. Saint-Castin's daughter was taken in the raid.

=== British colony ===
At the end of the French and Indian War, which secured British control over much of North America, the unoccupied lands along the Maine coast were opened to settlement by Massachusetts colonists. By the late 1760s, farmers, artisans, and small traders were beginning to take title to properties in and around "Major Baggadoose." Though the fur trade was long dead, the region's abundant fisheries and timber attracted entrepreneurs, and the attention of the British government, which was always on the lookout for store to supply its growing navy. Bagaduce was especially valuable for supplying timber suitable for masts on British warships.

=== American Revolution ===
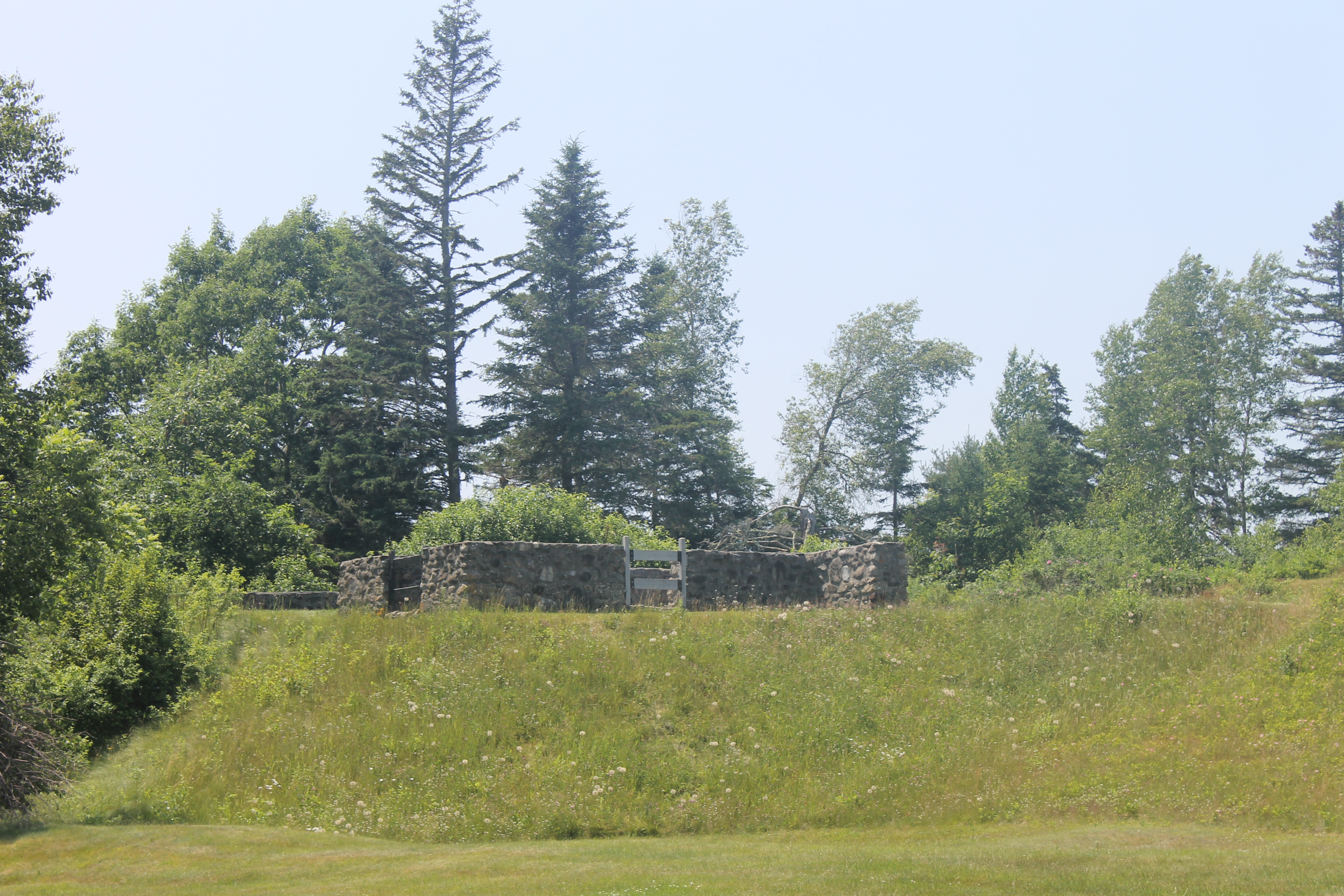
Ruins of former Fort George in Castine

In early July 1779, nearly three years after the American Patriots had declared independence from Britain, a British naval and military force under the command of General Francis McLean sailed into Castine's commodious harbor, landed troops, and established the colony New Ireland. They began erecting Fort George on one of the highest points of the peninsula. Alarmed by this incursion, the Massachusetts legislature dispatched what became known as the Penobscot Expedition. The military expedition consisted of a fleet of 19 armed vessels and 24 transports, carrying 344 guns, under Dudley Saltonstall, and a land force of about 1,200 men, under General Solomon Lovell, seconded by Gen. Peleg Wadsworth. Col. Paul Revere was given charge of the ordnance.

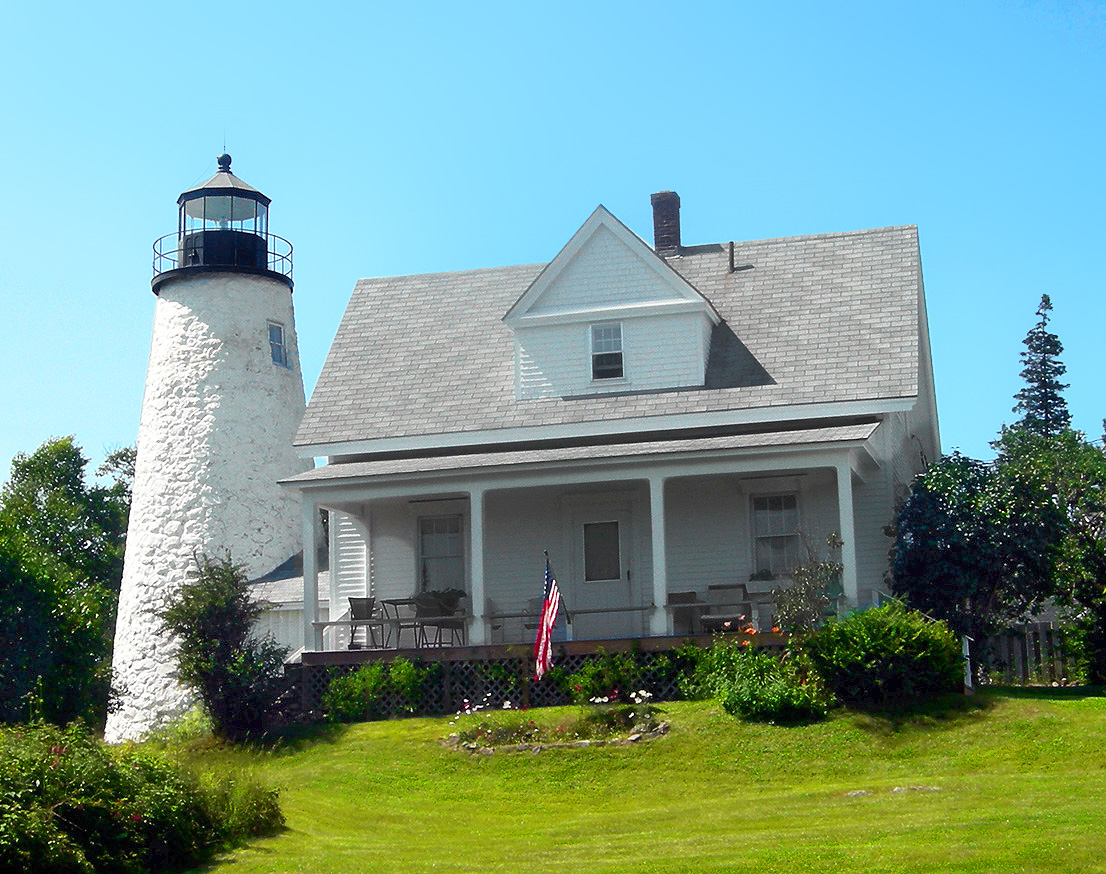
Dice Head Lighthouse in Castine

Although badly outnumbered, British soldiers of the 74th Regiment of Foot (Argyle Highlanders), managed to repel American attacks for nearly three weeks. In mid-August, British reinforcements appeared at the head of the bay. The Americans eventually abandoned the fight and retreated up the Penobscot River, destroying their entire fleet along the way to keep it out of British hands. The failed Penobscot Expedition, which cost the revolutionaries $8 million and 43 ships, proved to be the greatest American naval defeat until Pearl Harbor in 1941. The 74th Regiment held Majabagaduce until the end of the war, when it was ceded to the Americans as part of the peace settlement. Saltonstall and Revere were later court-martialed, charged with cowardice and insubordination; the boards found Saltonstall guilty, but acquitted Revere.

At the end of the Revolutionary War, many American Loyalists in the area migrated eastward to the Canadian Maritimes, some towing their houses behind their boats. Subsequently, known as United Empire Loyalists, they crossed the newly established international boundary line of the St. Croix River and established St. Andrews, one of the oldest towns in New Brunswick. In addition, many soldiers of the 74th chose to be disbanded in St. Andrews (last muster May 24, 1784), and took up land grants there along with the Loyalists, rather than return to Britain.

=== Incorporation ===
In 1762, the Provincial General Court granted the land designated as Township Number Three, commonly known as Majorbigwaduce or Majabigwaduce, to a group of proprietors. After some disputes concerning the proprietors' claims to the land, the General Court of Massachusetts recognized Township No. 3 and incorporated it as the Town of Penobscot in 1787. Penobscot then included what are now the towns of Castine, Penobscot, and Brooksville. On February 10, 1796, the Commonwealth of Massachusetts passed an act which separated Penobscot into the towns of Castine and Penobscot. Castine held its first town meeting on April 4, 1796.

=== War of 1812 ===
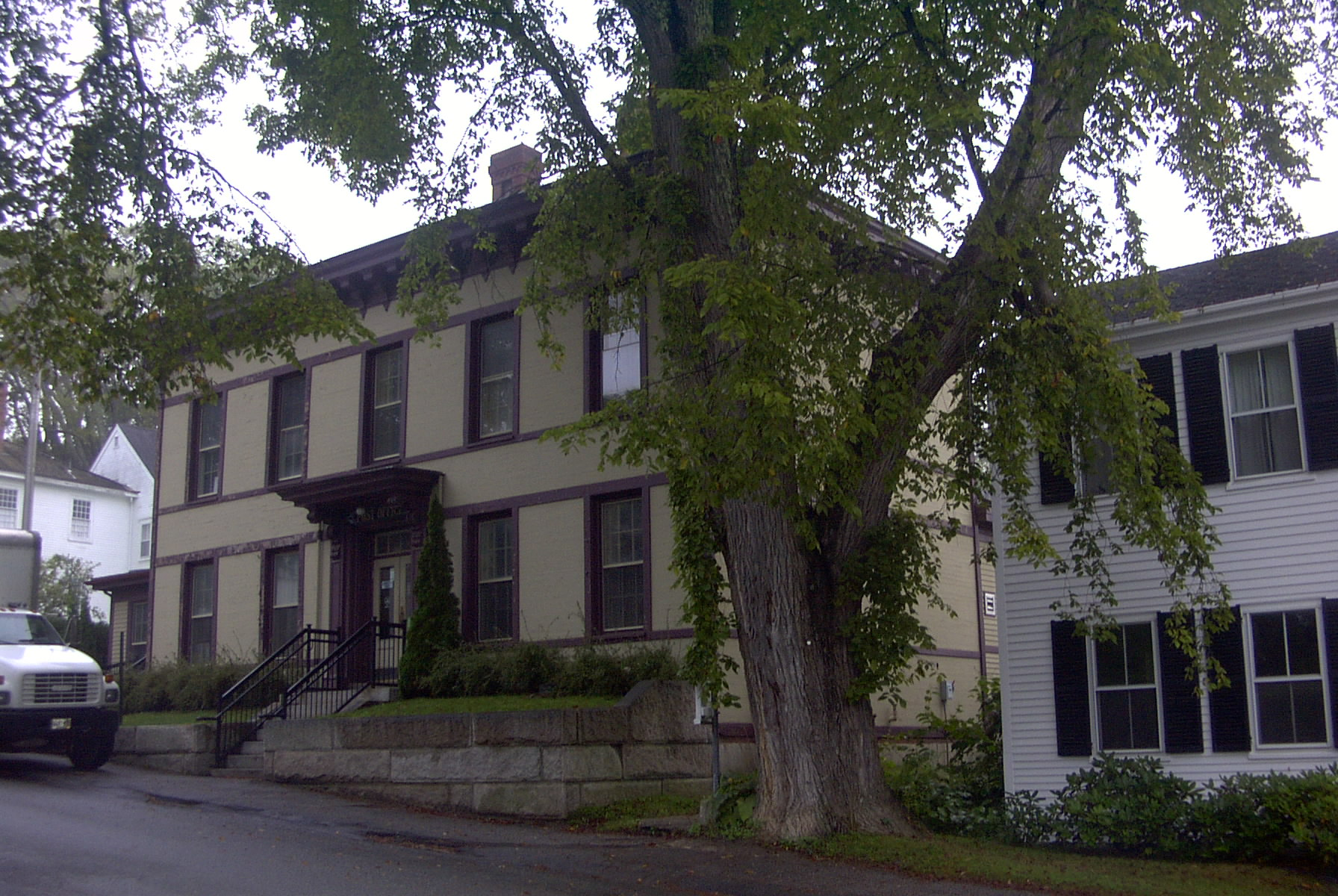
Castine's post office, established in 1794 and in the same building since 1833, is one of the United States's oldest post offices in continuous operation

The population reached 1036 in the 1810 Census. During the War of 1812, from his base in Halifax, Nova Scotia, in August and September 1814, Sir John Coape Sherbrooke sent a naval force and 500 British troops to conquer Maine and (again) establish the colony of New Ireland. In 26 days, they succeeded in taking possession of Hampden, Bangor, and Machias, destroying or capturing 17 American ships. They won the Battle of Hampden (losing two killed while the Americans lost one killed) and occupied the village of Castine for the rest of the war. A raging smuggling trade developed between Castine and the rest of Maine during its occupation. The Treaty of Ghent returned this territory to the United States. The British left in April 1815, at which time they took 10,750 pounds obtained from tariff duties at Castine. This money, called the "Castine Fund", was used in the establishment of Dalhousie University, in Halifax, Nova Scotia. The population was 975 at the Census of 1820.

=== 1820–1960 ===
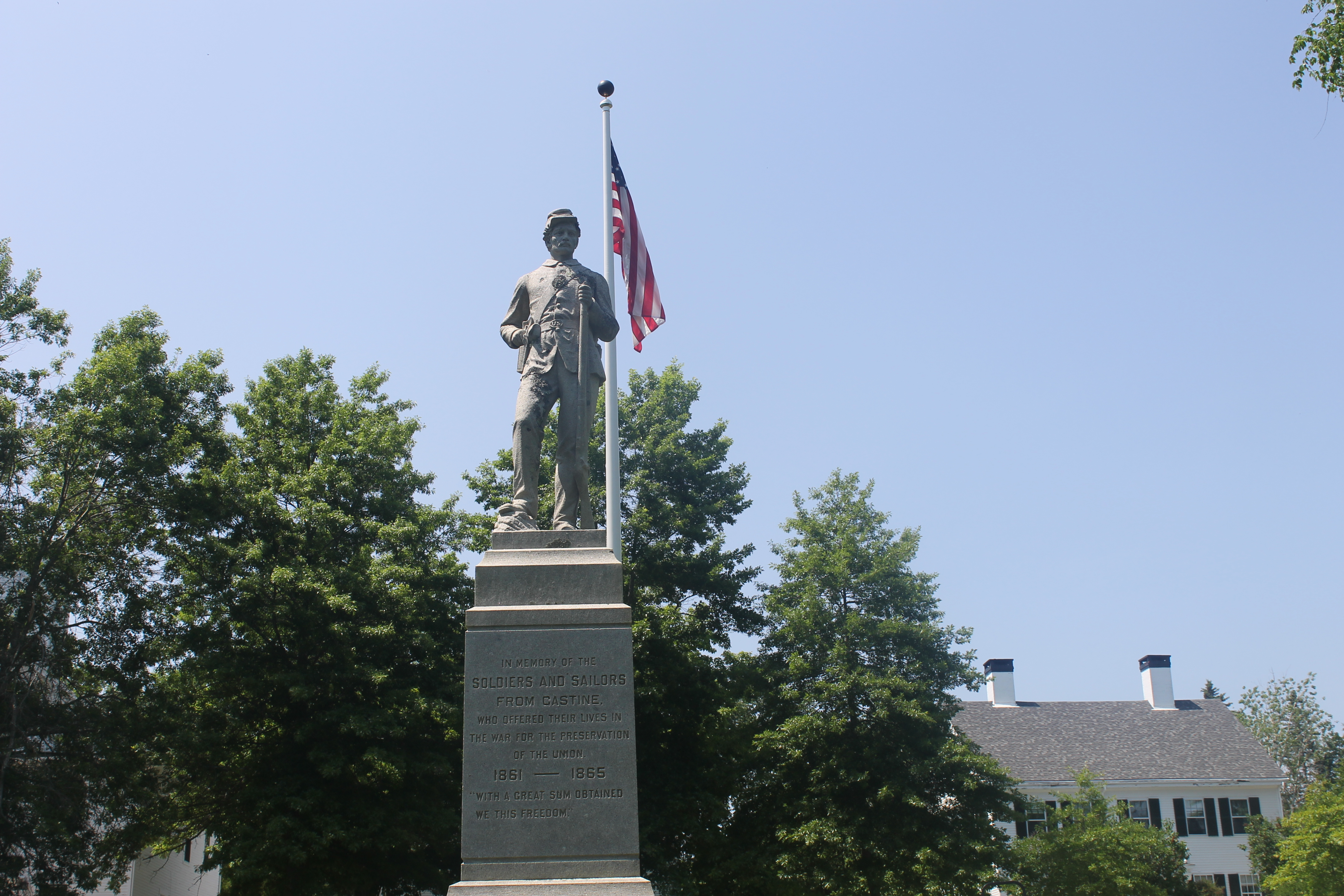
The Civil War monument on the village green is dedicated "In memory of the soldiers and sailors from Castine who offered their lives in The War for the Preservation of the Union."

With the growth of the postwar economy, the town became a prosperous place: the seat of Hancock County and a center for shipbuilding and coastal trading. By the 1820s, it had become a major entrepot for American fishing fleets on their way to the Grand Banks of Newfoundland. It also prospered from the lumber industry, in which eastern Maine dominated before the Civil War. During this period of growth and prosperity, many of the handsome Federal and Greek Revival style mansions that still grace the village's streets were constructed.

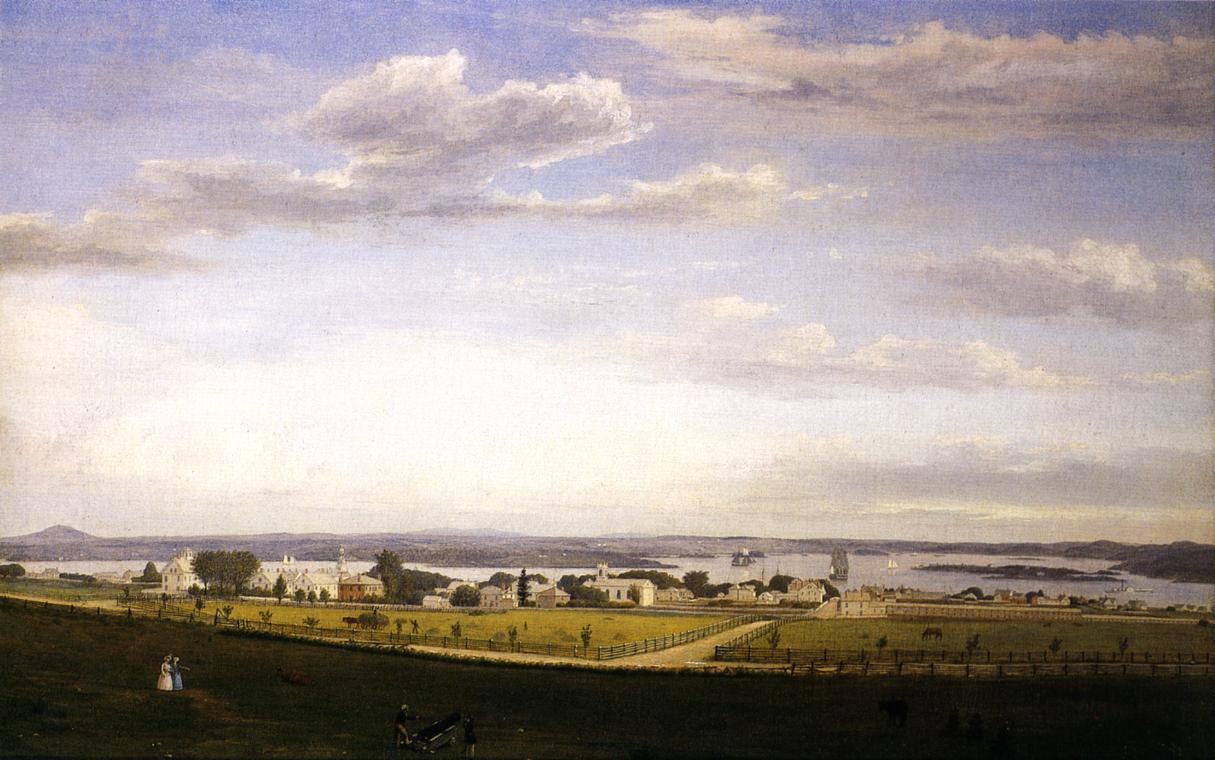
Castine from Fort George, 1856, by Fitz Henry Lane

Castine declined after the Civil War. By then its fleet, which once sailed the globe, carried coal, firewood, and lime to coastal ports in competition with railroads and steamships. Ambitious young people sought their fortunes elsewhere. In 1838, the Hancock County seat moved to Ellsworth.

By the 1870s, Castine's quaint old architecture and cool summer air attracted "rusticators"—well-to-do urban families seeking rest and recreation. Its charms also drew activists, including Harriet Beecher Stowe and Henry Wadsworth Longfellow, whose writings romanticized its past. By the 1890s, wealthy families from Boston, Hartford and Chicago were buying up old farms and sea captains' houses. Hotels and inns opened as Castine became a flourishing summer colony. Since 1867, it had been site of the Eastern State Normal School.

In the 1930s, the Great Depression and the automobile killed off the hotel trade, the steamship lines that had linked coastal towns and islands, and the local fishing industry. The fortunes of the community did not revive until the 1960s, with the rediscovery of the town's charms by a new generation of summer tourists.

=== 1980s–2000s ===
A key element in the revival of Castine has been the expansion of the Maine Maritime Academy. Established in 1941 to train merchant seamen, by the 1980s the academy offered a range of courses in engineering, management, transportation, and nautical and ocean science. Its campus, once the home of the Eastern State Normal School, features a library (available to the public) and extensive athletic facilities.

Castine has a number of historic sites and parks (including the ruins of British earthworks at Fort George), a deep water harbor (with tie-ups for small boats beyond the current of the Penobscot and Bagaduce rivers), a non-exclusive club offering golf, tennis and yachting facilities, restaurants, and four churches (Episcopal, Roman Catholic, Congregational and Unitarian Universalist). In addition, the town has a public library, an historical society, and the Wilson Museum, an institution featuring exhibits of anthropological, natural and local artifacts. Castine's streets are lined with Federal, Greek Revival, Cape Cod and other antique style houses, and shaded by large elms which are replaced with disease-resistant strains when they succumb. The Castine Post Office is in one of the oldest Post Office buildings in continuous operation in the United States. The Federal government began leasing the building (built in 1817) in 1833 and later purchased the building. In 1869 the building was renovated to accommodate the Castine Post Office.

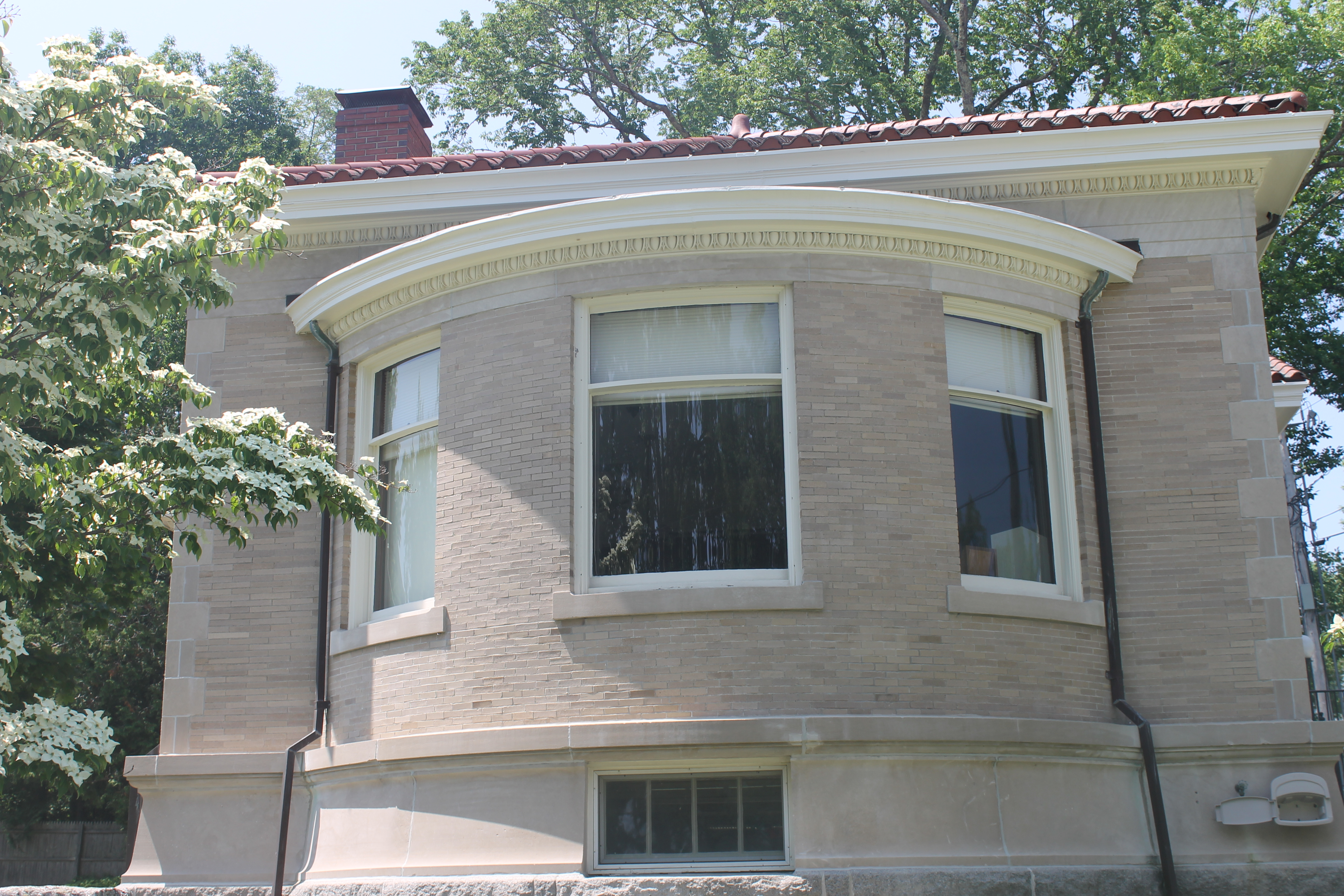
The Witherle Memorial Library

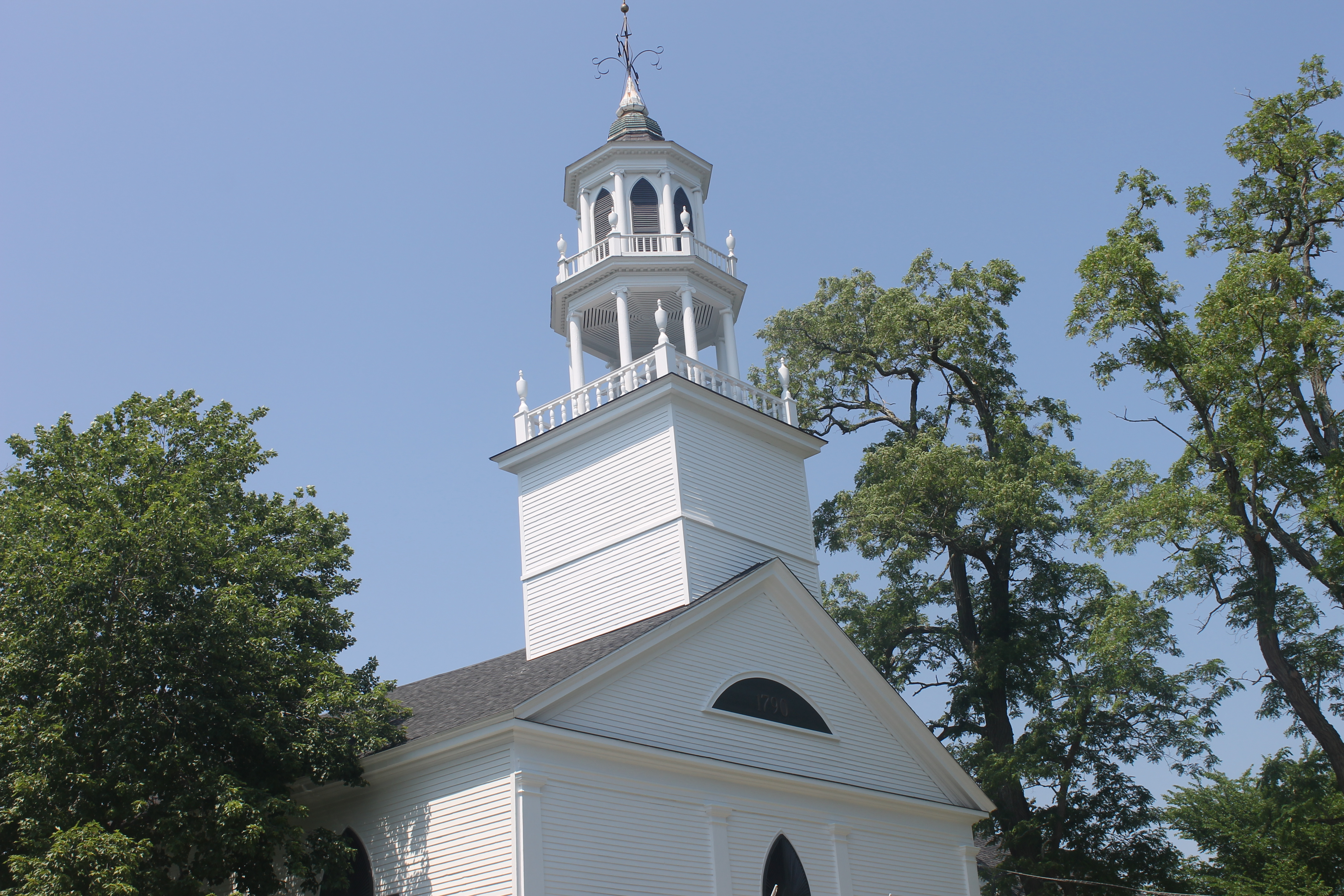
Unitarian Universalist Church at 86 Court Street in Castine dates to 1790.

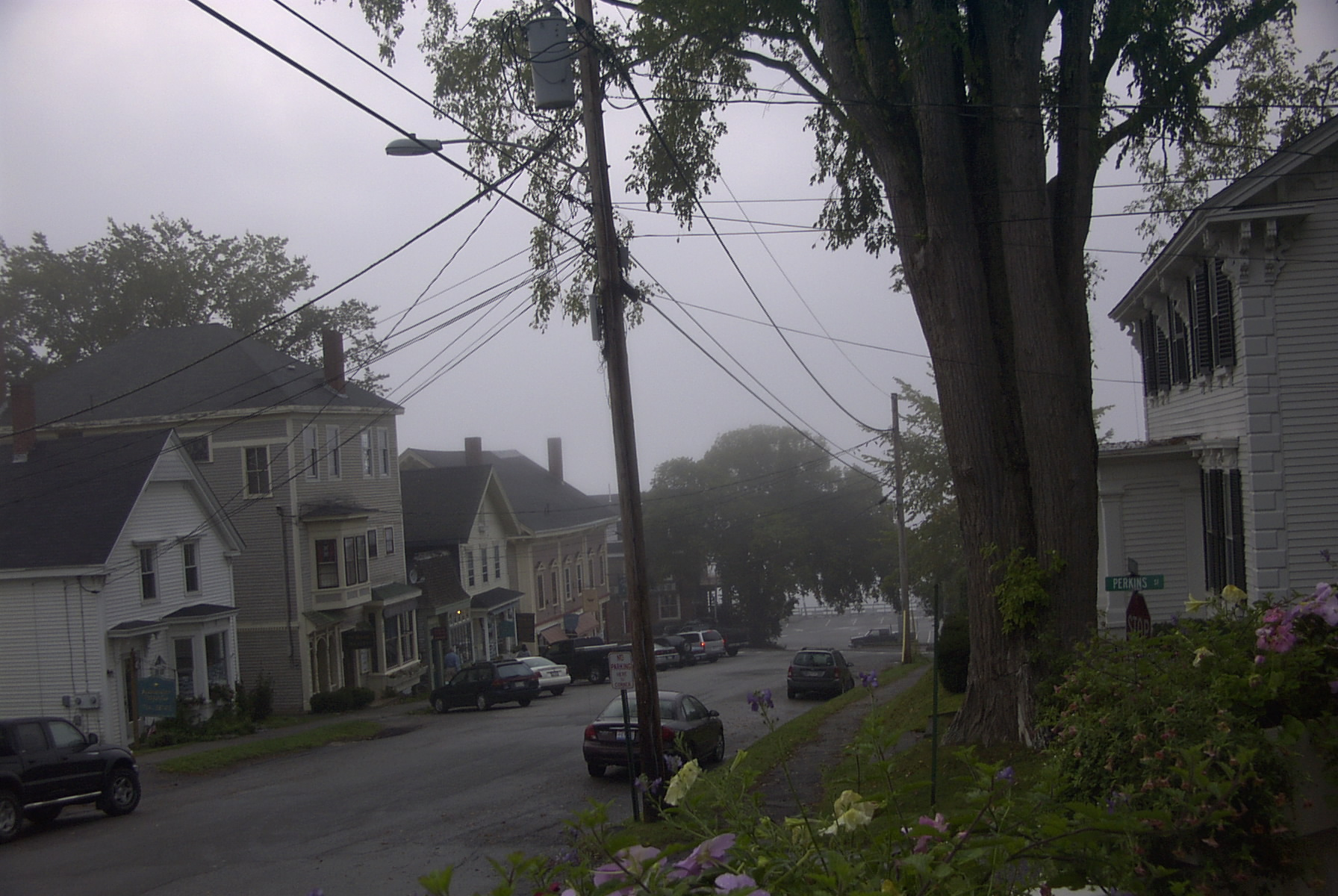
Main Street toward the Castine dock on a cloudy day

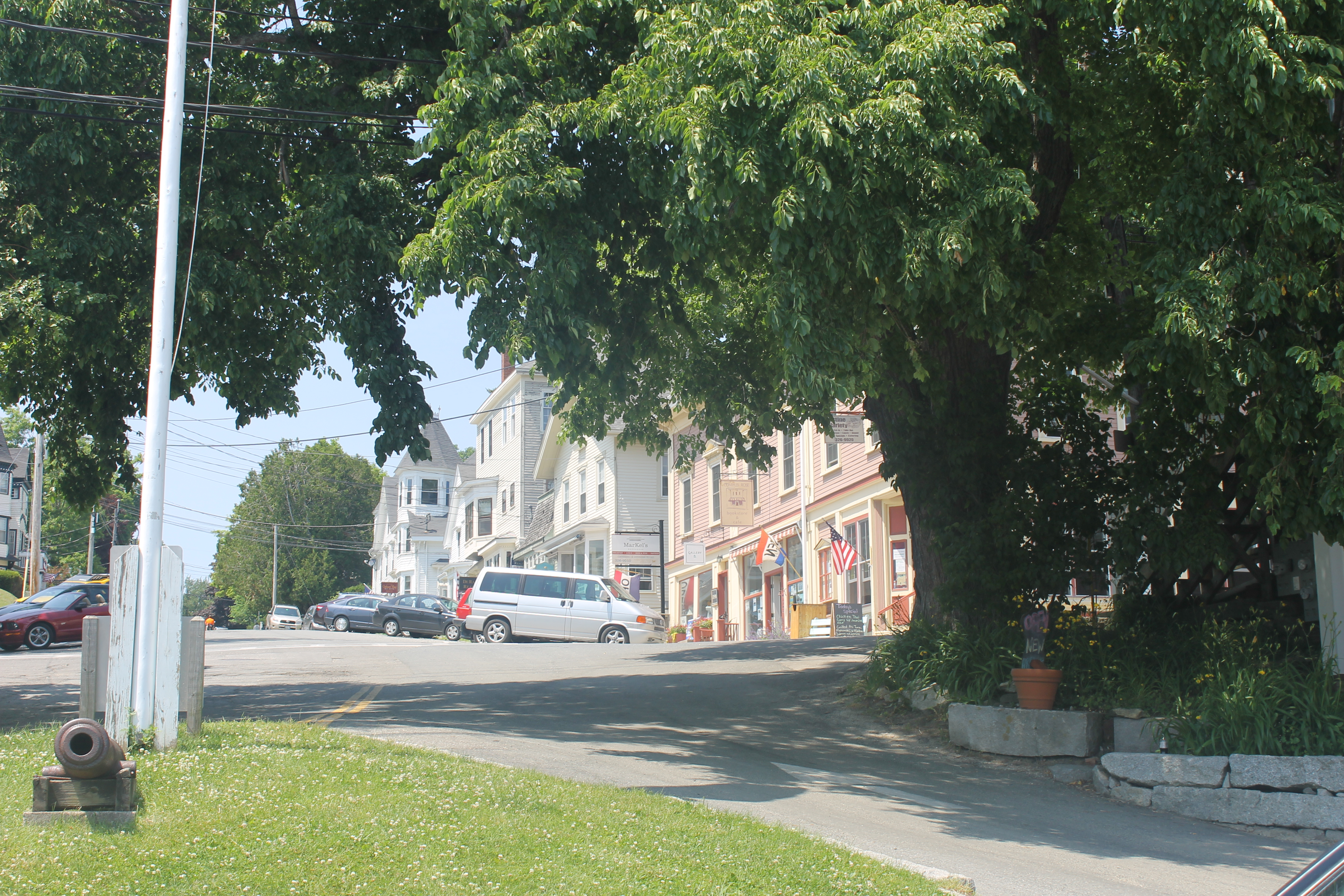
Main Street as viewed from the dock on a sunny summer day

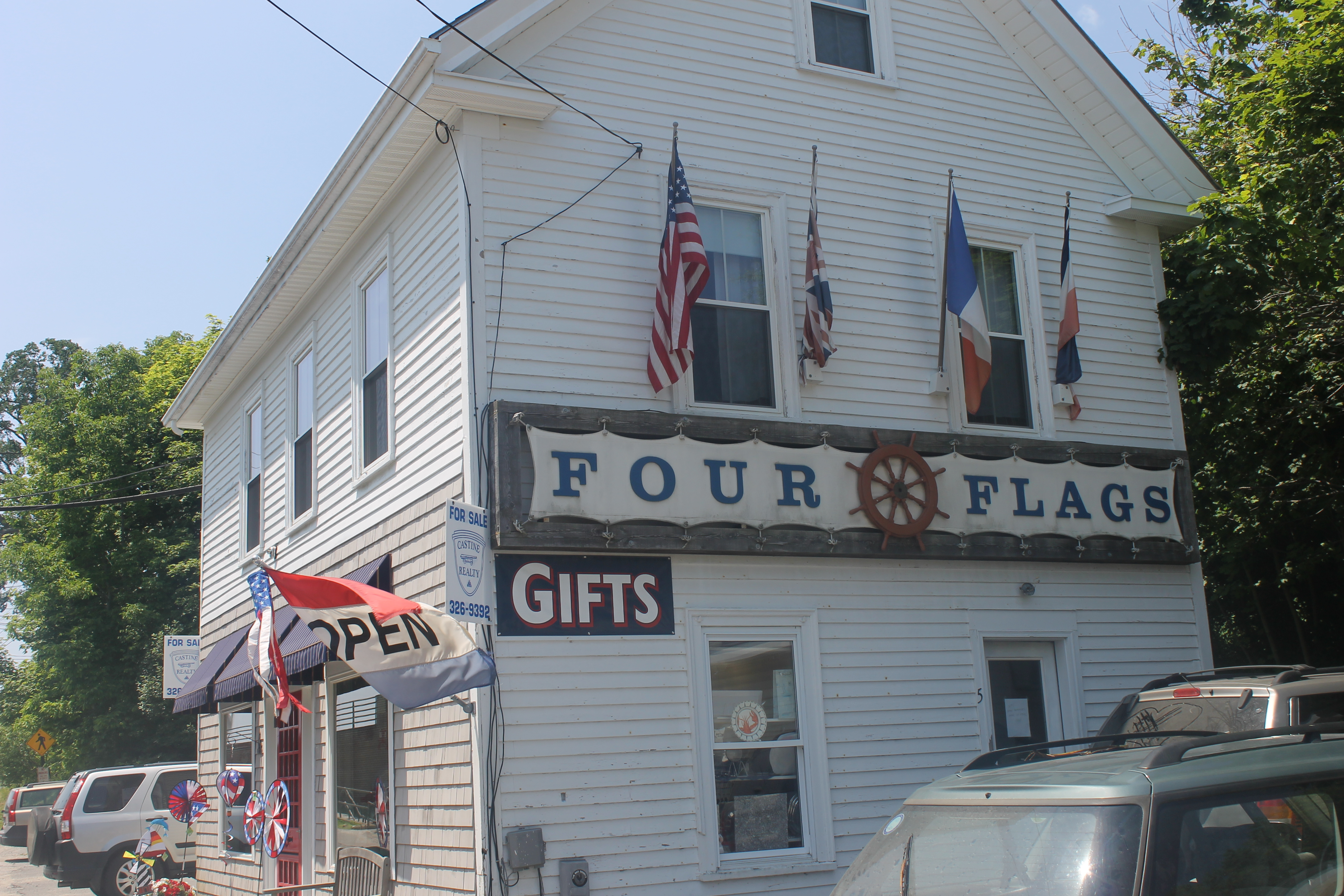
Four Flags gift shop in Castine

== Geography ==
According to the United States Census Bureau, the town has a total area of 20.01 square miles (51.83 km^{2}), of which 7.78 square miles (20.15 km^{2}) is land and 12.23 square miles (31.68 km^{2}) is water. Castine is drained by the Bagaduce River estuary.

The town is crossed by state routes 166 and 166A. Situated on a peninsula in Penobscot Bay, Castine is bordered by the town of Penobscot to the northeast, Brooksville across the Bagaduce River to the southeast, and near Islesboro to the southwest.

== Demographics ==
Historical population
Census	Pop.	Note	%±
1800	665		—
1810	1,036		55.8%
1820	975		−5.9%
1830	1,148		17.7%
1840	1,188		3.5%
1850	1,260		6.1%
1860	1,357		7.7%
1870	1,303		−4.0%
1880	1,215		−6.8%
1890	987		−18.8%
1900	925		−6.3%
1910	933		0.9%
1920	743		−20.4%
1930	726		−2.3%
1940	662		−8.8%
1950	793		19.8%
1960	824		3.9%
1970	1,080		31.1%
1980	1,304		20.7%
1990	1,161		−11.0%
2000	1,343		15.7%
2010	1,366		1.7%
2020	1,320		−3.4%
U.S. Decennial Census

Pentagoet, a tugboat of the Maine Maritime Academy

=== 2010 census ===
As of the census of 2010, there were 1,366 people, 380 households, and 193 families residing in the town. The population density was 175.6 inhabitants per square mile (67.8/km^{2}). There were 704 housing units at an average density of 90.5 per square mile (34.9/km^{2}). The racial makeup of the town was 96.7% White, 0.5% African American, 0.1% Native American, 1.1% Asian, 0.4% from other races, and 1.2% from two or more races. Hispanic or Latino of any race were 1.2% of the population.

There were 380 households, of which 15.5% had children under the age of 18 living with them, 43.9% were married couples living together, 4.2% had a female householder with no husband present, 2.6% had a male householder with no wife present, and 49.2% were non-families. 29.5% of all households were made up of individuals, and 14.4% had someone living alone who was 65 years of age or older. The average household size was 2.13 and the average family size was 2.58.

The median age in the town was 22.2 years. 7.5% of residents were under the age of 18; 50.6% were between the ages of 18 and 24; 10.2% were from 25 to 44; 15.7% were from 45 to 64; and 16.2% were 65 years of age or older. The gender makeup of the town was 66.5% male and 33.5% female.

=== 2000 census ===
As of the census of 2000, there were 1,343 people, 372 households, and 222 families residing in the town. The population density was 172.2 inhabitants per square mile (66.5/km^{2}). There were 649 housing units at an average density of 83.2 per square mile (32.1/km^{2}). The racial makeup of the town was 97.10% White, 0.67% African American, 0.60% Native American, 0.74% Asian, 0.22% from other races, and 0.67% from two or more races. Hispanic or Latino of any race were 0.60% of the population.

There were 372 households, out of which 18.0% had children under the age of 18 living with them, 49.2% were married couples living together, 7.0% had a female householder with no husband present, and 40.3% were non-families. 30.1% of all households were made up of individuals, and 12.4% had someone living alone who was 65 years of age or older. The average household size was 2.16 and the average family size was 2.69.

In the town, the population was spread out, with 10.3% under the age of 18, 41.9% from 18 to 24, 15.0% from 25 to 44, 18.4% from 45 to 64, and 14.4% who were 65 years of age or older. The median age was 24 years. For every 100 females, there were 186.4 males. For every 100 females age 18 and over, there were 196.8 males.

The median income for a household in the town was $46,250, and the median income for a family was $65,500. Males had a median income of $36,250 versus $30,893 for females. The per capita income for the town was $20,078. About 3.2% of families and 12.0% of the population were below the poverty line, including 10.9% of those under age 18 and 4.7% of those age 65 or over.

== Education ==
It is in the Castine School District. The public elementary school is Adams School.

Castine pays George Stevens Academy, a private school, to educate its students at the high school level.

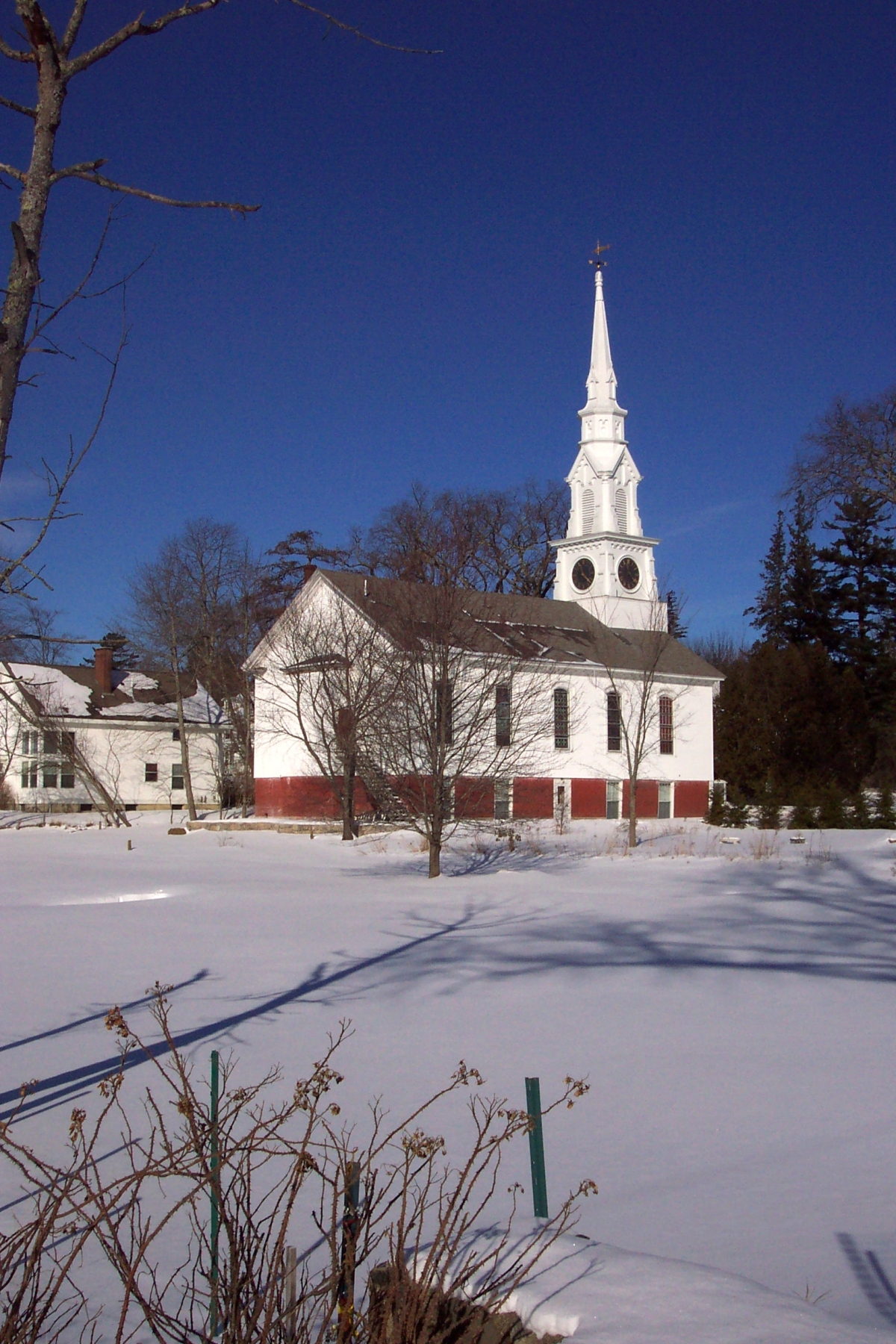
A view in Castine

== Notable people ==
- Philip Booth, poet, educator
- Noah Brooks, journalist, biographer, author
- Deborah Joy Corey, author
- Peter Davis, Academy Award-winning film director
- Molly Dewson, activist, feminist, America's first female political boss
- Germain Doucet, military officer
- David Hall, sound archivist
- Elizabeth Hardwick, writer, literary critic
- Katharine Butler Hathaway, writer
- Robert Lowell, poet
- Mary McCarthy, novelist
- Don McLean, singer and songwriter
- Benjamin Milliken, American Loyalist
- Abraham Niles, abolitionist
- Richard Rosen, state senator
- Hezekiah Williams, U.S. congressman

== Bibliography ==
- History of Castine, Penobscot, and Brooksville, Maine including the ancient settlement of Pentagoet. By George Augustus Wheeler. Published 1875.
- Buker, George E. 2002. "The Penobscot Expedition: Commodore Saltonstall and the Massachusetts Conspiracy of 1779." Annapolis, MD: Naval Institute Press.
- Bourne, Russell. 1989. "The View from Front Street: Travels through New England's Historic Fishing Communities." New York : W.W. Norton.
- Bourne, Russell. 1990. 'The Red King's Rebellion: Racial politics in New England, 1675–1678." New York, NY: Atheneum, 1990.
- Cornwell, Bernard (2010). The Fort. New York: HarperCollins. ISBN 9780007331727. A historical novel depicting the Penobscot Expedition, with a non-fiction "Historical Note" (pp. 451–468) on sources and key details.
- Doudiet, Ellenore. 1978. "Majabigwaduce: Castine, Penobscot, and Brooksville." Castine, ME: Castine Scientific Society.
- Dunn, Brenda (2004). A History of Port-Royal-Annapolis Royal, 1605-1800. Nimbus. ISBN 978-1-55109-740-4.
- Faulkner, Alaric, 1987. "The French at Pentagoet, 1635–1674: An Archaeological Portrait of the Acadian Frontier." Augusta, ME: Maine Historic Preservation Commission.
- Griffiths, N.E.S. (2005). From Migrant to Acadian: A North American Border People, 1604-1755. McGill-Queen's University Press. ISBN 978-0-7735-2699-0.
- Maine League of Historical Societies and Museums (1970). Doris A. Isaacson (ed.). Maine: A Guide 'Down East'. Rockland, Me: Courier-Gazette, Inc. pp. 349–351.
- Smith, Joshua M. Making Maine: Statehood and the War of 1812 Amherst: the University of Massachusetts Press, 2022.
- Wasson, George Savary. 1932. Sailing Days on the Penobscot: The River and Bay as They Were in the Old Days; with a Record of Vessels Built There, Compiled by Lincoln Colcord. Salem, MA: Marine Research society, 1932.
- Wheeler, George A. 1923. "History of Castine: Battle Line of Four Nations." Cornwell, NY: privately printed.
