= John Rhoades =

Canadian politician

John Rhoades was a fur trader from New England, who was part of Jurriaen Aernoutsz's short-lived conquest of Acadia in 1674.

A resident of Massachusetts, Rhoades met with Aernoutsz shortly after the latter's arrival in New York City, and used his familiarity with the region to convince Aernoutsz to attack Acadia. He took the Dutch oath of allegiance, and served as the navigator and pilot on Aernoutsz's expedition.

On August 10, 1674, Aernoutsz, Rhoades and the crew of the Flying Horse captured Fort Pentagouet in two hours. They then sailed up the Bay of Fundy, pillaging several French posts along the coast and ending at Fort Jemseg, which they also captured. Aernoutsz claimed Acadia as the Dutch territory of New Holland, burying bottles at both Pentagouet and Jemseg to assert his claim, and remained in Acadia for about a month. He then left Rhoades in charge of New Holland while he returned to Curaçao in search of settlers.

However, Rhoades, Peter Roderigo, and Cornelius Andreson began seizing New England vessels coming to trade with the Wabanaki Confederacy. As a result, the government of Massachusetts apprehended the party and tried them as pirates, during which time the French regained control of the territory without any military opposition. Rhoades was condemned to death, but he was eventually released on condition that he leave Massachusetts. He was later granted a trading license by the Dutch West India Company during Cornelius Van Steenwyk's brief attempt to regain control of Acadia in 1676, but was again arrested for trespassing on the territory of James, Duke of York. He was taken back to New York City, but was released after a brief imprisonment.
