= Josh Scott =

Josh Scott or Joshua Scott may refer to:

- Josh Scott (basketball) (born 1993), American basketball player
- Josh Scott (footballer) (born 1985), English footballer
- Joshua Scott Jones (born 1980), American singer
- Josh Scott (footballer, born 2001) (born 2001), see 2023–24 Northern Football League

== See also ==
- Joshua Scottow, American merchant and author
