= Jurriaen Aernoutsz =

Dutch colonial navy captain

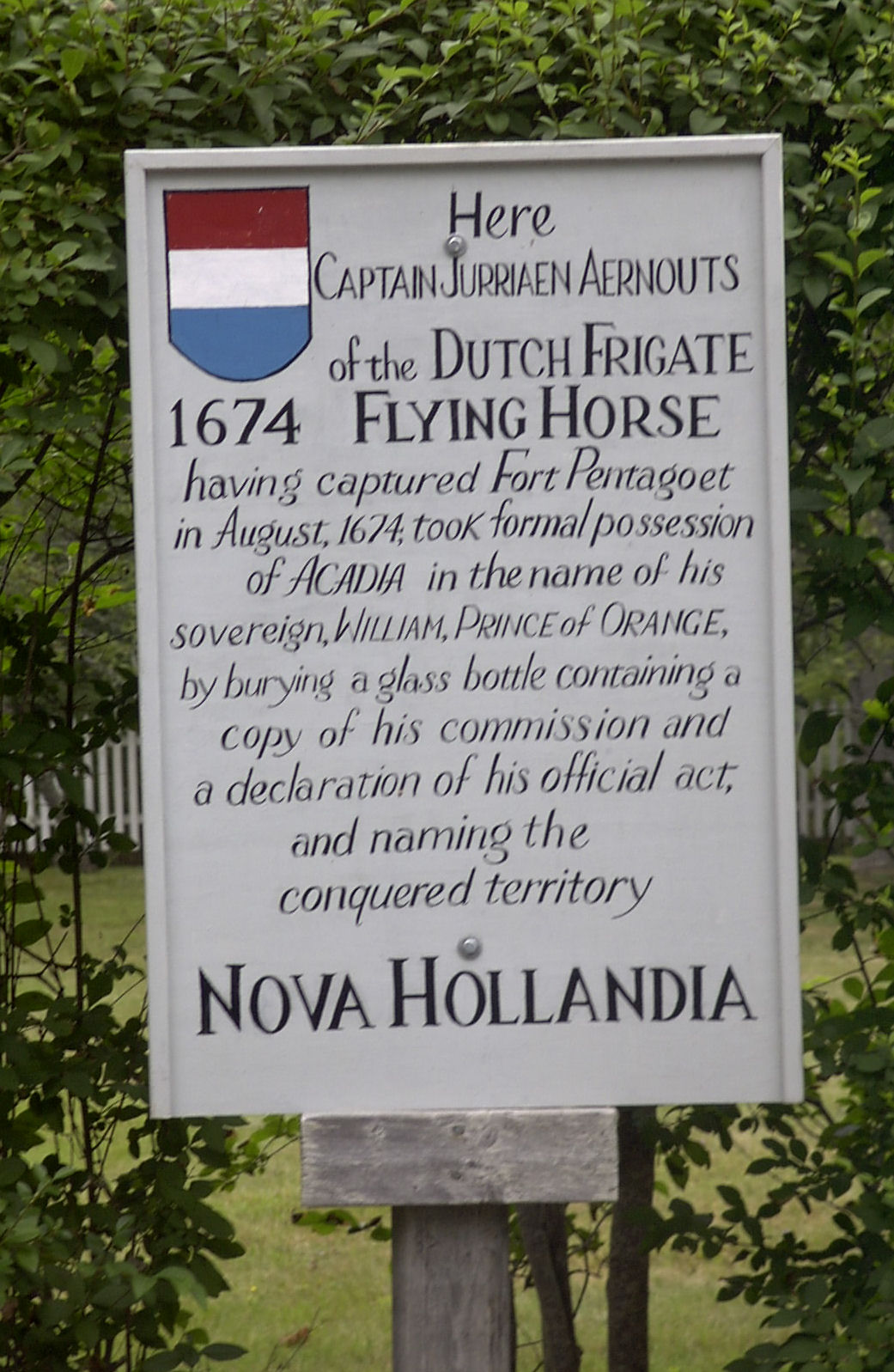
Marker commemorating the Dutch conquest of Acadia (1674), which they renamed New Holland. This spot is where Jurriaen Aernoutsz buried a bottle at the capital of Acadia, Fort Pentagouet, Castine, Maine

Jurriaen Aernoutsz (or Aernouts) was a Dutch colonial navy captain, who briefly conquered the capital of Acadia, Fort Pentagouet in Penobscot Bay (present day Castine, Maine) and several other villages, and renamed the colony New Holland during the Franco-Dutch War.

The commander of the frigate Flying Horse, based at Curaçao during the Third Anglo-Dutch War, Aernoutsz was dispatched by the governor of Curaçao to fight French and English ships in the North Atlantic after the Netherlands recaptured New York City. By the time he reached New York, however, the English and the Dutch had made peace in the Treaty of Westminster — but with the Franco-Dutch War still underway, Aernoutsz met with John Rhoades and decided to attack Acadia.

On August 10, 1674, Aernoutsz and the crew of the Flying Horse captured Fort Pentagouet in two hours. He then sailed up the Bay of Fundy, pillaging several French posts along the coast and ending at Fort Jemseg, which he also captured. Aernoutsz claimed Acadia as the Dutch territory of New Holland, burying bottles at both Pentagouet and Jemseg to assert his claim, and remained in Acadia for about a month. He subsequently returned to Boston in mid-September, disposing of his pillage and selling the cannon from Pentagouet to the government of Massachusetts.

Aernoutsz then returned to Curaçao in October, leaving Rhoades and company in Boston with orders to return to Acadia to maintain possession of the territory. Once in Acadia, Rhoades, Peter Roderigo, and Cornelius Andreson began seizing New England vessels coming to trade with the Wabanaki Confederacy. As a result, the government of Massachusetts apprehended the party and tried them as pirates, during which time the French regained control of the territory without any military opposition.

The Dutch continued to consider New Holland part of their colonial empire in North America, appointing Cornelius Van Steenwyk as Dutch governor of the territory in 1676, but this was largely a paper designation — in actual practice, the region remained under French control and sovereignty. Shortly after his appointment, Van Steenwyk sent a Dutch expedition to reoccupy Pentagouet, but they were turned back by three English warships from Boston. The Dutch continued to claim sovereignty over Acadia on paper until 1678, when they surrendered the claim at the end of the war.
