= George Augustus Wheeler =

American Civil War surgeon (1837–1923)

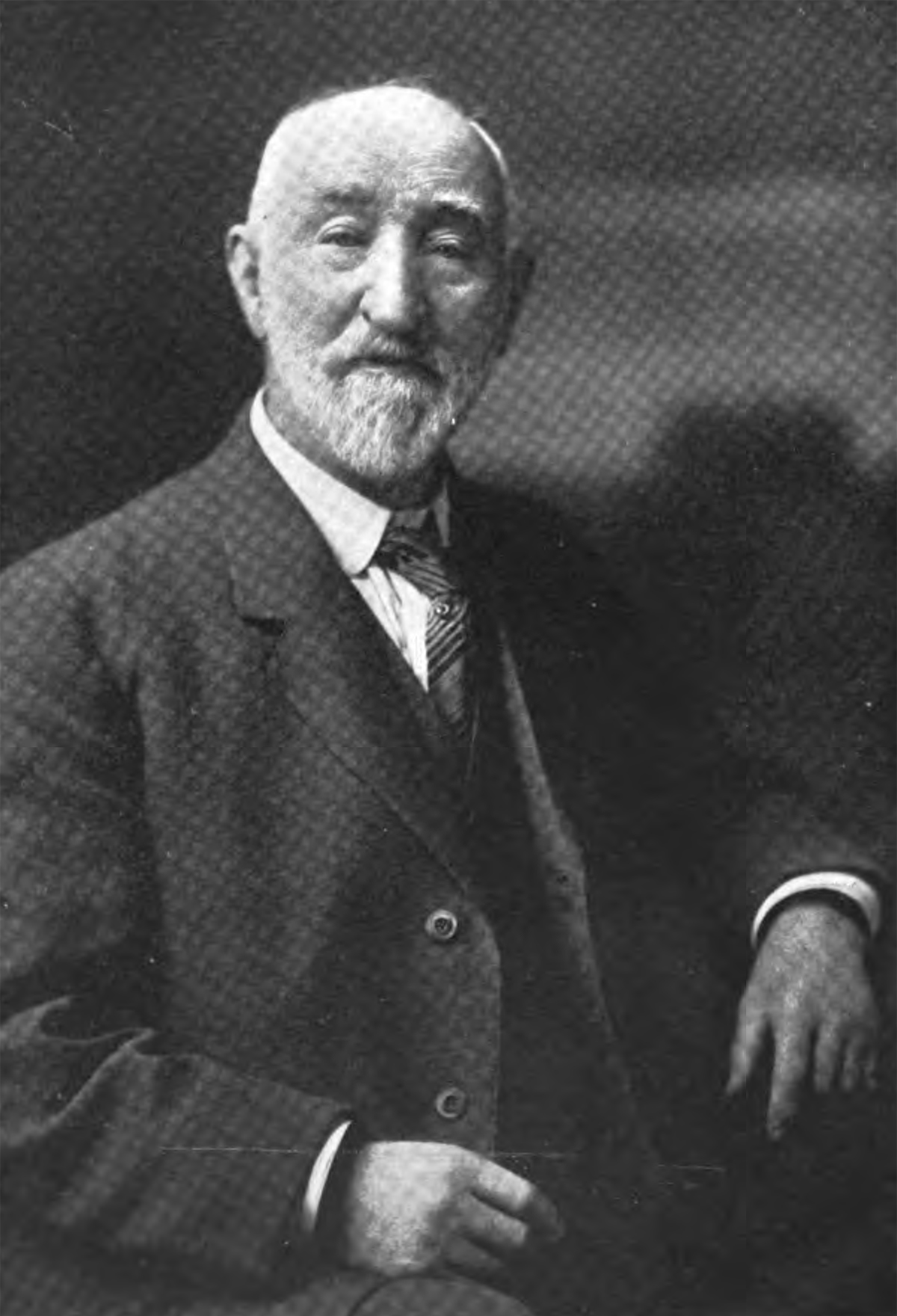
- George Augustus Wheeler c. early 1900s
- Born: July 26, 1837; Standish, Maine, US
- Died: January 14, 1923 (aged 85); Castine, Maine, US
- Education: Bowdoin College; Harvard Medical School
- Occupations: Doctor of Medicine; Historian; author
- Known for: Maine history research
- Spouse: Margaret Wheeler (m. 1864)
- Military career
- Allegiance: Union Army
- Years: 1862–1865
- Rank: Lieutenant colonel
- Units: 18th Maine Regiment; 9th Army Corps
- War: American Civil War

Signature
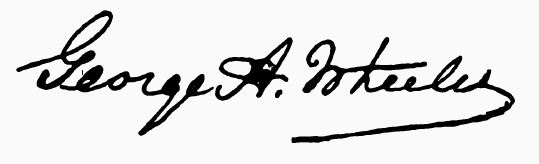

George Augustus Wheeler, MD (July 26, 1837 – January 14, 1923) was a surgeon in the American Civil War and a prominent Maine historian. He authored two historical books including History of Brunswick, Topsham, and Harpswell, Maine, which the Pejepscot Historical Society states as the "authoritative text on the three towns through 1878".

== Early life ==
Wheeler was born in Standish, Maine on July 26, 1823, to Minister Amos Dean Wheeler and Louisa Amelia Wheeler. He graduated from Bowdoin College with a Bachelor of Arts and in 1856 received his master's degree from Bowdoin College's Medical School of Maine. He received his doctorate from Harvard Medical School in 1859.

From 1859 to 1862 Wheeler lived in several different towns of Maine, including Falmouth, Orland and Presque Isle.

== Military career ==
In July of 1862, Wheeler enlisted in the United States Army and was mustered into the 18th Maine Volunteer Infantry Regiment as a private. He would later become a Sergeant of Company G. The 18th Maine would later have its name changed to the 1st Maine Heavy Artillery Regiment and disbanded after the war.

On October 4, 1862, Wheeler was commissioned assistant surgeon, U.S. Volunteers, and soon after he was appointed to take charge of the U.S. General Hospital at Annapolis Junction, Maryland, On March 30, 1864, he was commissioned Surgeon of United States Volunteers, and ordered to the Army of the Potomac and was placed in charge of the Depot Field Hospitals of the 9th Army Corps.

In the summer of 1864 Wheeler served as medical director with a division of the 9th Army Corps; Medical Inspector of Hospitals, and later, Surgeon in charge of Field hospitals, and temporarily medical director of the Corps.

During the Siege of Petersburg, Wheeler was put in charge of all the Confederate Army hospitals, but owing to a change in the military command, he was relieved and ordered to Burksville Junction in Virginia, and placed in charge of transporting all the wounded to City Point, Virginia where he went with three railroad trains of the wounded.

At the close of the war he was ordered to Louisville, Kentucky, and from there to Jeffersonville, Indiana, where he remained until he was mustered out in July of 1865. On June 1, 1865, he was brevetted "for faithful and meritorious services" as lieutenant colonel.

== Later life ==
George Wheeler's house, Castine, Maine, built c. 1812

After leaving the Army, Wheeler practiced as a physician for a short time in Alberton, Maryland, then went to Washington, D.C. where he was employed as a surgeon by the Bureau of Refugees and Freedmen, and was in charge of the hospital in Arlington County, Virginia.

Wheeler then, was employed at Campbell General Hospital as an assistant surgeon. In 1868 he moved to Topsham, Maine to practice medicine, later moving to Old Town, Maine, where he was in practice until 1870, when he moved to Castine, Maine. While in Castine, he became a Camp Commander for the Grand Army of the Republic, a Civil War veterans organization, Post No. 76.

In 1874 Wheeler wrote the book The History of Castine, Brooksville and Penobscot, Maine and in 1876 co-authored with his brother, Henry Warren Wheeler, the book History of Brunswick, Topsham and Harpswell, Maine: Including the Ancient Territory Known as Pejepscot.

Wheeler was on the Board of selectmen for Castine, Maine and in 1876 he was chosen as Chairman of the School Committee of Castine to which he was repeatedly elected. In 1878 he was elected a member of Maine Historical Society. Wheeler was prominently connected with the Masonic Fraternity, a part of the Republican Party and a member of the Unitarian church.

== Family, legacy and death ==
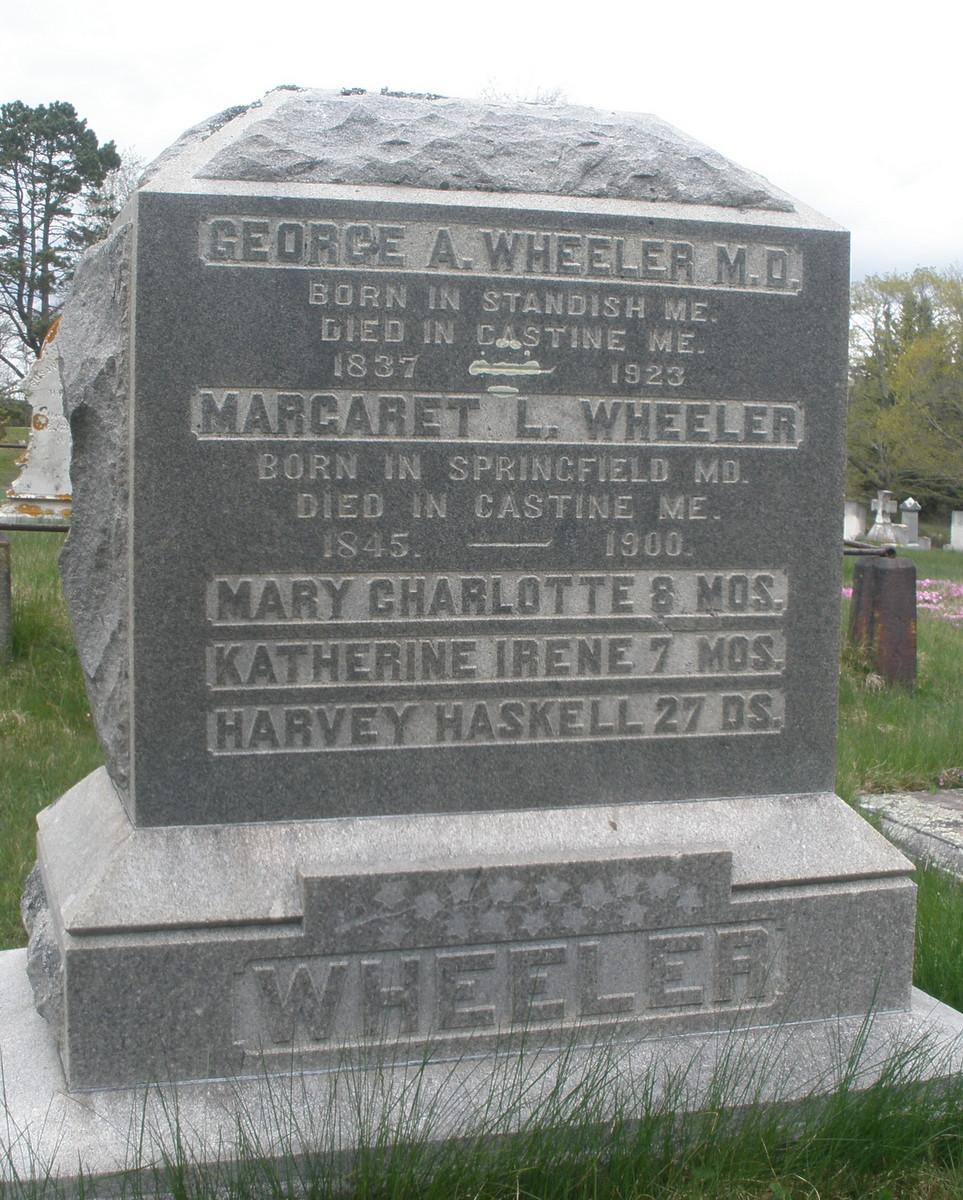

February 17, 1864, Wheeler married Mrs. Margaret Lavinia Dorsey, daughter of John F. and Elizabeth Harvercotta of Maryland. The same day he legally adopted Elizabeth Dorsey, daughter of John R. and Margaret L. Dorsey, and gave her the name Elizabeth Dorsey Wheeler. Wheeler and Dorsey had four other children: two daughters, Frederic L. Smith, Boyd Bartlett and two sons, George D. Wheeler and C. A. Wheeler. They also had three other children that died at young ages: Mary Charlotte (8 months old), Katherine Irene (7 months old) and Harvey Haskell (27 days old).

Later in life, as well as an established physician, Wheeler was a well respected historian. His two books, The History of Castine, Brooksville and Penobscot, Maine and the History of Brunswick, Topsham and Harpswell, Maine were heavily researched and well received. Over the years these books have been "considered by scholars as being culturally important, and is part of the knowledge base of civilization as we know it."^{C}

The later of the two books is stated by the Pejepscot Historical Society to be "considered the authoritative text on the three towns through 1878".^{A}

George Augustus Wheeler died on January 14, 1923, in Castine, Maine.

== Bibliography ==
Bibliography
Image	Title	Year	Publisher	Location	Ref.
History of Castine Penobscot and Brooksville book cover	History of Castine, Penobscot and Brooksville, Maine; Including the Ancient Settlement of Pentagöet	1875	Cornwall Press	Castine, Maine; Penobscot, Maine; Brooksville, Maine	
History of Brunswick Topsham and Harpswell Maine Book cover	History of Brunswick, Topsham, and Harpswell, Maine: Including the Ancient Territory Known as Pejepscot	1878	A. Mudge & Sons	Brunswick, Maine; Topsham, Maine; Harpswell, Maine; Pejepscot	

== Notes ==
a. On the inside front cover of the 2nd ed. (1974), via Curtis Memorial Library (Brunswick, Maine), the Pejepscot Historical Society states "The History of Brunswick, Topsham, and Harpswell, Maine has long been considered the authoritative text on the three towns through 1878."
b. This article incorporates text from this source, which is in the public domain.
c. Quotes are on the back cover of both books (2016 editions) ISBN 978-1-36267-547-1 ISBN 978-1-35741-641-6
