= Jean Baptiste Guedry =

Pirate

Jean-Baptiste Guedry (died 1726, last name also Guidry or Giddery, in English John Baptist Jedre) took over a small ship off Acadia and was tried for piracy. The trial was publicized to First Nations in the region as an example of English law.

== History ==
Joseph Decoy, a ship's captain from Cape Breton Island, traded in Boston during the 1720s. On one of the trips, his son accompanied him, who was detained in Boston for reasons unknown. Decoy returned north without his son and stopped and shared his news with friends at the Acadian port town of Merliguesh (now Lunenburg, Nova Scotia). Decoy shared with Guedry and other locals that he was desperate to get his son back and pondered the seizure of a New England fishing vessel as ransom for his son's return. The meeting took place on September 4, 1726.

Tensions were already high between New Englanders and French Acadians after the recent conclusion of the Dummer's War, a 1722-1725 conflict between English colonists and the Indian nations of the Wabanaki Confederacy.

Guedry was an Acadian, but many of his relatives and his sons had been raised among the native Mi’kmaq people. Acadia was then a French colony that encompassed all of present-day Nova Scotia. Kidnappings and coercive subjugation of French settlers were common practices by English naval vessels in the region. Decoy's idea to seize a Boston fishing vessel, began to infect the group not only as a means to secure the younger Decoy's freedom but also to protest the continued practice of French colonist kidnappings by English naval vessels. French piracy laws were not as severe as that of their English counterparts and so it is unlikely that the group was aware of the severity of their proposed crimes.

On August 25, 1726, the 42 year-old Jean Baptiste Guedry Sr., his son Jean Baptiste Guedry Jr., and other local Acadians noted the docking of a passing ship, the 25-ton fishing sloop Tryal, captained by Samuel Doty of Plymouth, Massachusetts, at Merliguesh Harbor. Doty was fetching fresh water and after a friendly conversation, he offered to take Guedry, his son, and three other Acadians aboard, where they shared drinks and exchanged other news. Doty and all but one of the crew went ashore to visit Guedry’s mother, Marguerite Petitpas, after an invitation for dinner. Jean Baptiste Sr. remained aboard. Upon the group's return, Jean Baptiste Jr was present with James and Phillipe Mius, Marguerite Petitpas, and a group of nine Indians including “a squaw with two children” (Note: What became of the woman and the children is not recorded in the trial documents.) They boarded the ship and the men of the group seized it. The group tore down the English flag; Guedry(Sr) girdled it around his waist as a belt and tucked his pistol under it. Doty and the crew were brought back aboard and kept under watch. Doty pleaded with Jean Baptiste Sr.'s mother, Marguerite Petitpas, to intercede, but she was unable to talk the group down.

Jean Baptist Guedry seemed to take charge of the group as the incident progressed. He ordered Doty to sail the ship eastward. The Mius brothers and Marguerite stayed ashore. Once underway, Guedry, his son, and six Mi'kmaq collaborators intended to seek out a French ship, join up with it, and board it. However, at some point during the night, Doty and his crew turned on their captors, overpowered them, threw some in the ship's hold, and barricaded others in the cabin. Shots were fired, but no one was injured. Three of the Mi’kmaq natives leaped out the cabin's windows rather than face capture by the English. Guedry and his associates were subdued, and Doty delivered them to New England authorities.

Guedry, his son, and the three remaining Indians were transported to Boston for trial on October 4, 1726. Unusually, the court appointed not only a lawyer for Guedry’s defense but also French and Mi’kmaq translators (Guedry spoke little English and his son none). His lawyer argued that Guedry's attack was mere robbery because it happened so close to shore, and that at 14, his son was too young for a death sentence. The prosecutor countered that any attack at sea was piracy, and that 14 was the age of majority for criminal cases. The court agreed. New England authorities used the trial as a public event meant to set an example for the French settlers of Acadia. Jean Baptiste Guedry and his 14-year-old son Jean Baptiste Jr., were executed via public hanging on the Boston Common on November 13, 1726. Guedry's wife, children, mother, and other family members were present.

The prosecutor and others used the trial as a counter to local customs, which allowed the holding of a group (all Englishmen) responsible for an individual's crimes. They also used it as a test case for separating English law, as applied to Acadia, from the law applied to First Nations groups like the Wabanaki Confederacy. Guedry and his son were tried as Acadians, but the Mius brothers and another man were classed as $Indians" and were tried separately.

After the Guedry executions, New England colonial officials had the trial transcripts translated into French. A group was organized to travel to Acadia to read the transcripts to French Acadian and native Mi'kmaq villages. The campaign was intended to demonstrate and to caution the settlers as to the definition of English law and the potential outcomes of English prosecution. The trial and the subsequent execution of Guedry and his son was characteristic of many such incidents that marked a continued rise in tensions between New England and French settlers in the region. The tensions eventually culminated in the Great Expulsion of the Acadians from Acadia in 1755 to 1764, during and after the North American French and Indian War.

== See also ==
- Cornelius Andreson - A Dutchman who, like Guedry, sailed from Acadia and was subsequently tried for piracy against the English.
- Admiralty court, the venue in which Guedry and his associates were tried.
- King Philip’s War, a predecessor to Dummer’s War and another in a series of English/native conflicts in the late 17th and early 18th centuries.
