= George Savary Wasson =

American writer and painter (1855–1932)

- Born: August 27, 1855; Groveland, Massachusetts, U.S.
- Died: April 28, 1932 (aged 76)
- Occupations: Novelist; painter; boat builder
- Children: 2

George Savary Wasson (August 27, 1855 – April 28, 1932) was an American novelist, painter and boat builder.

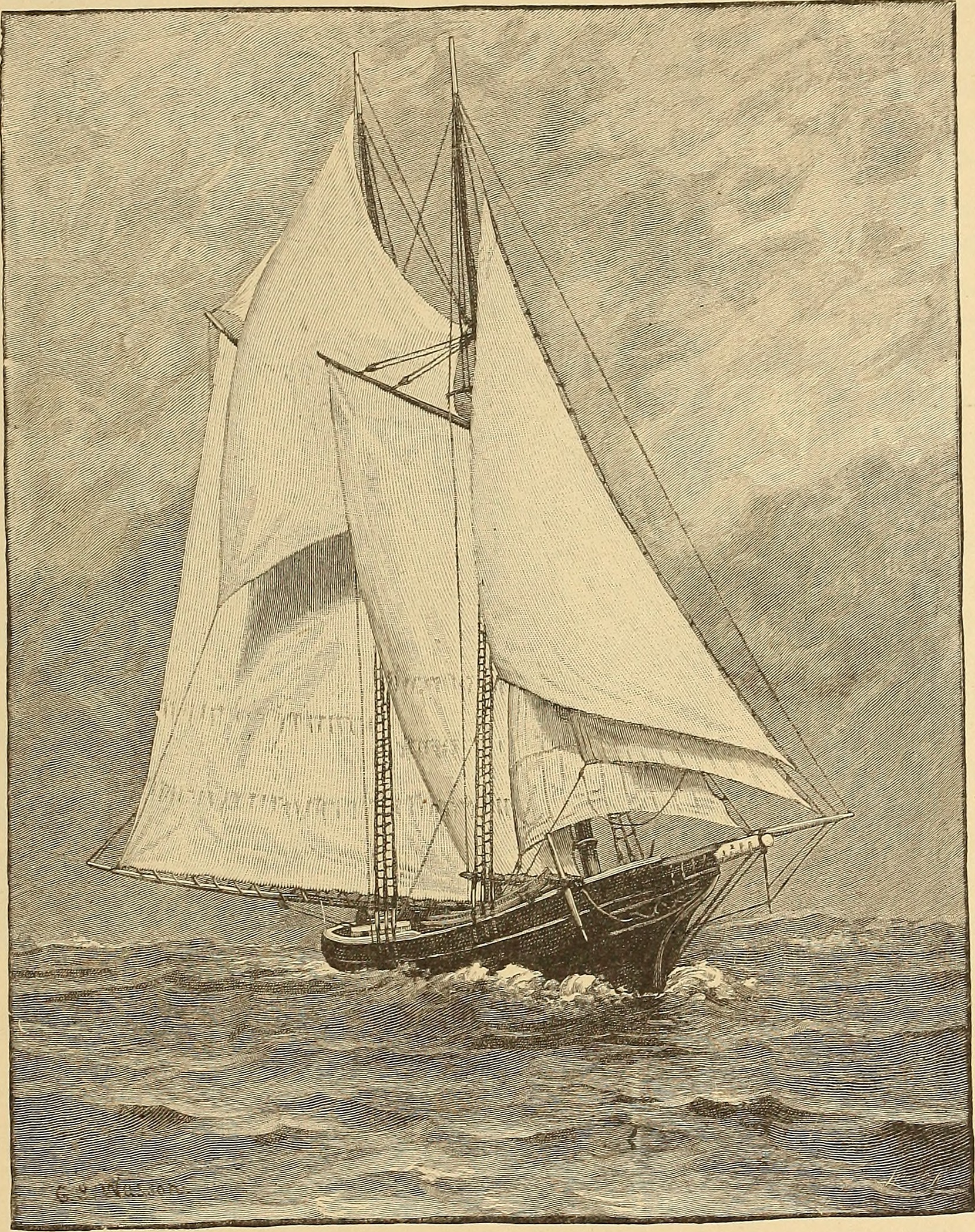
The ″Wandering Wind″ Bound Out

Wasson was born in Groveland, Massachusetts on August 27, 1855. His father was David Atwood Wasson, a Transcendentalist pastor. He settled in Kittery Point, Maine in 1889, where he built a house. He had two sons, David Arnold (1887–1915) and Lewis Talcott (1889–1912). In 1916, Wasson moved to Bangor.

Wasson wrote novels, which he illustrated. His novels captured the New England dialect used in southern Maine at the turn of the century.

== Works ==
- Cap’n Simeon’s Store (1903)
- The Green Shay (1905)
- Home from Sea (1908)
- Sailing Days on the Penobscot (1932)
