= Fort Pentagouet =

Acadian fort in modern Castine, Maine

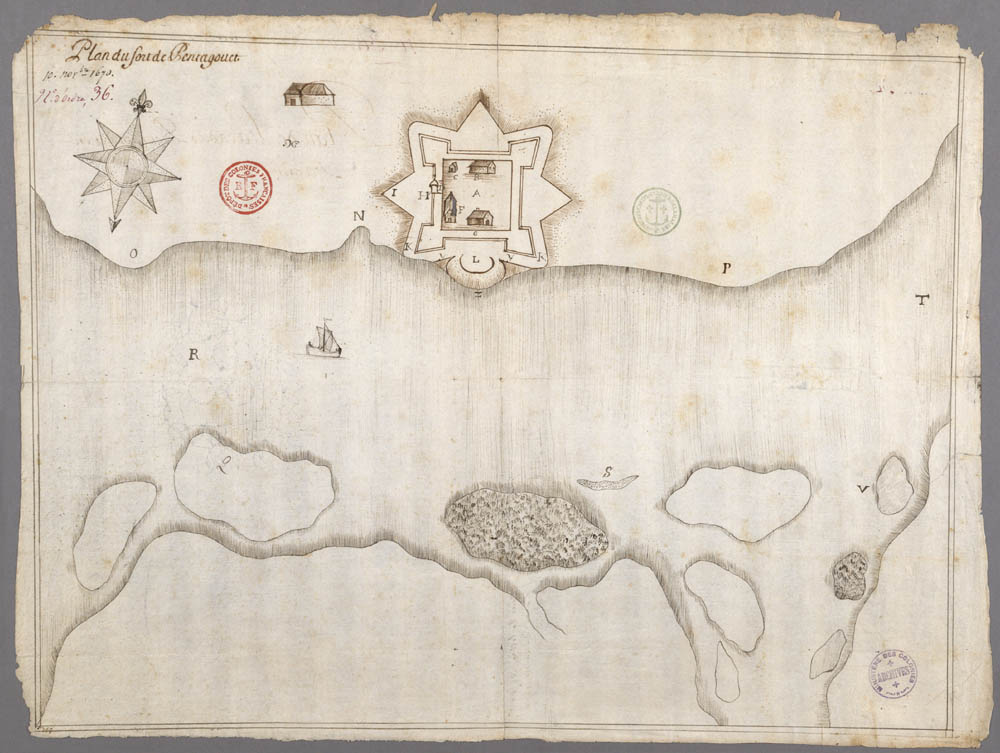
Fort Pentagouët in 1670

Fort Pentagouët (Fort Pentagoet, Fort Castine, Fort Penobscot, Fort Saint-Pierre) was a French fort established in present-day Castine, Maine, which was the capital of Acadia (1670–1674). It is the oldest permanent settlement in New England.

Its commanding position at the mouth of the Penobscot River estuary, a lucrative source of furs and timber, as well as a major transportation route into the interior, made the peninsula of particular interest to European powers in the 17th century. Majabagaduce (as the Abenaki name would be corrupted) changed hands numerous times with shifting imperial politics. At one time or another, it was occupied by the French, Dutch and England's Plymouth Colony.

== La Tour ==
Castine was founded in the winter of 1613, when Claude de Saint-Étienne de la Tour established a small trading post to conduct business with the Tarrantine Indians.

After the trading post was established at Castine, a raid by English captain Samuel Argall at Mount Desert Island in 1613 signaled the start of a long-running dispute over the boundary between French Acadia to the north and the English colonies to the south. There is evidence that La Tour immediately challenged the English action by re-establishing his trading post in the wake of Argall's raid. Captain John Smith charted the area in 1614 and referred to French traders in the vicinity. In 1625, Charles de Saint-Étienne de la Tour erected a fort named Fort Pentagouët.

English colonists from the Plymouth Colony seized it in 1629, and made it an administrative outpost of their colony.

== Aulnay ==
From 1635 to 1654, Charles de Menou d'Aulnay de Charnisay defended his private commercial interests at Fort Pentagoet. In 1635, it was retaken by the French and again incorporated into Acadia; Governor Isaac de Razilly sent Charles de Menou d'Aulnay de Charnisay to retake the village. In 1638, Aulnay built a more substantial fort named Fort Saint-Pierre. While he had other ventures in Acadia, Fort Pentagoet was his major outpost on the frontier with New England. Emmanuel Le Borgne with 100 men raided the settlement in 1653.

Major General Robert Sedgwick led 100 New England volunteers and 200 of Oliver Cromwell's soldiers on an expedition against Acadia in 1654. Before taking its capital, Port Royal, Sedgwick captured and plundered the French settlement at Pentagouët. The English occupied Acadia for the next 16 years and Fort Pentagouët saw very little use.

== Capital of Acadia ==
From 1670, when Acadia was returned to the French, Fort Pentagouët became the Capital of Acadia under two Governors Hector d'Andigné de Grandfontaine (1670–73) and Jacques de Chambly (1673-74), both formerly of the Carignan-Salières Regiment. (Saint-Castin had already set up his near-by trading post three years earlier in 1667).

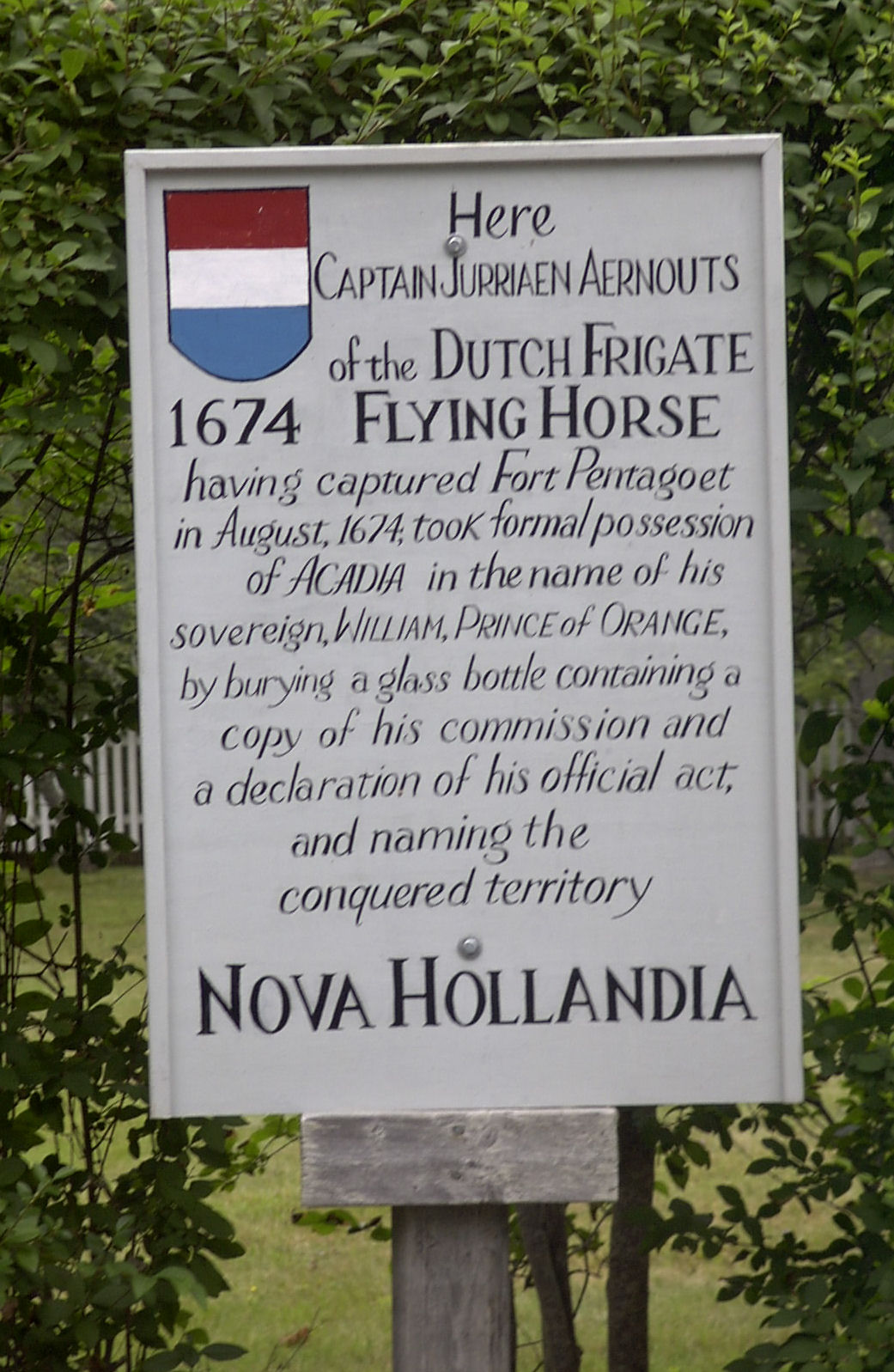
Marker commemorating the Dutch conquest of Acadia (1674), which they renamed New Holland. This is the spot where Jurriaen Aernoutsz buried a bottle at the capital of Acadia, Fort Pentagouët, Castine, Maine

During the Franco-Dutch War (1674), Pentagouët and other Acadian ports were captured by the Dutch captain Jurriaen Aernoutsz who arrived from New Amsterdam, renaming Acadia, New Holland. The Dutch turned the fort's cannon on its own walls and destroyed most of it after the second siege. Saint-Castin himself retook it in 1676 and renamed the town Bagaduce, a shortened version of Majabagaduce.

== The Habitation of Saint-Castine ==
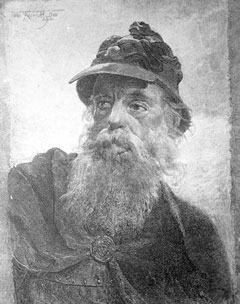
Baron Jean-Vincent de Saint-Castin

From 1667, after the Treaty of Breda, until 1700, Saint-Castin, former ensign at Fort Pentagoet, re-established French authority nearby at a small trading post that formed a nucleus of a new French and Indian habitation. French authorities dispatched the Baron Jean-Vincent de Saint-Castin to take command of Pentagouët. The baron married an Abenaki woman, the daughter of the sachem Modockawando. She adopted the French name Mathilde and bore him 10 children. The baron became a widower and then married another Abenaki woman named Marie Pidiwammiskwa who bore him two additional children. Castine soon became a force in colonial trade and diplomacy.

After 1677, Saint-Castin returned to his trading post within a village of 160 Etchemin Indians - two European buildings within a settlement of thirty-two wigwams.

== King William's War ==
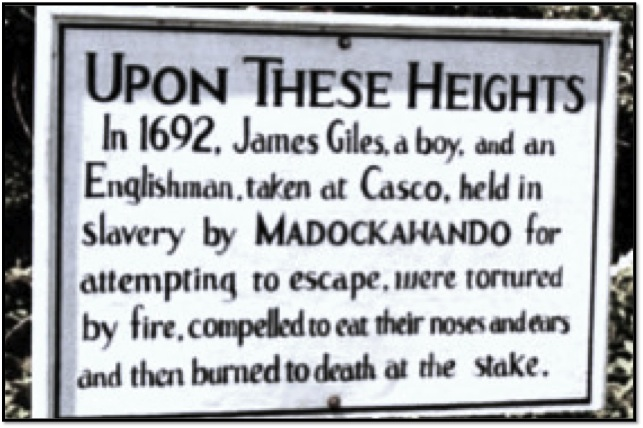
Sign at site of death of John Gyles' brother, Dyce Head Lighthouse Rd., Castine, Maine

During King William's War, Castin's settlement was plundered by English Governor Sir Edmund Andros in 1688. In response, Saint-Castin led an Abenaki war party to raid the English settlement at Pemaquid (present-day Bristol, Maine) in August 1689. During the Siege of Pemaquid (1689), one of the captives the Maliseet took back to their main village, Meductic, was John Gyles, who created one of the few captivity narratives to come out of Nova Scotia/Acadia. John Gyles' brother James was also captured by the Penobscot and eventually taken back to Fort Penobscot where he was tortured and burned alive at the stake.

In 1692 the village was again seized by the English, when Major Benjamin Church destroyed the fort and looted the settlement. With the return of Baron de Saint-Castin and his sons to France, the settlement became sparsely occupied.

== Queen Anne's War ==
During Queen Anne's War, in response to the French Raid on Deerfield in February 1704, New England Colonel Benjamin Church raided Castin's settlement (then known as Penobscot) before moving on to raid other Acadian villages at present-day St. Stephen, New Brunswick, Grand Pré, Pisiguit (present-day Windsor, Nova Scotia), and Chignecto. St. Castin's daughter was taken in the raid.

== See also ==
- Pentagoet Archeological District
