= Joshua Scottow =

Joshua Scottow (England, ca. 1618 - Boston, Massachusetts, Thirteen Colonies, January 20, 1698), was a colonial American merchant and the author of two histories of early New England: Old Men's Tears for Their Own Declensions (1691) and A Narrative of the Planting of the Massachusetts Colony Anno 1628 (1694).

== Life ==
Scottow emigrated to Massachusetts between 1630 and 1634 with his widowed mother Thomasina and older brother Thomas. He settled in Boston and was admitted to membership in the Old (South) Church in 1639. He married Lydia (surname unknown) in 1640, and they had seven children. He acquired considerable wealth trading with Acadia, dealing in waterfront property, and developing frontier settlements near Scarborough, Maine. In November 1658, William Crowne, proprietor of Nova Scotia, leased a portion of the colony to Scottow and Captain George Curwin (grandfather of Salem Witch Trials high sheriff George Corwin). He clashed with others in Scarborough: Scottow had a long-running legal battle with neighbor Andrew Alger over ownership of a flake yard and was twice summoned to court over potential involvement in the 1681 drowning death of Nathan Bedford.

He served as a captain in King Philip's War alongside pardoned pirate Peter Roderigo. His use of resources and manpower for his own advantage further alienated his neighbors, as did two incidents where Scottow refused to come to the aid of nearby garrisons. Alger was killed in one of those incidents. Scottow later stood trial before the Massachusetts General Court regarding his use of military resources; while he was away in Boston Scottow's garrison surrendered it to Native Americans without firing a shot.

He was survived by his wife and four children, three daughters and a son Thomas, who graduated from Harvard College in 1677.

== Writings ==
Scottow was a Puritan and self-described "Old Planter." Both of his histories declare that the founding generation of New England was “animated as with one soul” for the achievement of a millennial religious mission and that the present (1690s) generation has lost its focus and loyalties. Scottow’s language is replete with biblical and classical references.

=== Opposition to Witchcraft Trials ===
In 1656, Scottow seems to have opposed some aspect of the prosecution of Ann Hibbins, who was accused of witchcraft. Scottow wasn't alone. Another contemporary critic of the trial, Rev. John Norton (a hero of Scottow's) was said to have quipped that Hibbins "was hanged for having more wit than her neighbors." Ann Hibbins was executed on June 19, 1656 and Scottow was one of five men named in her will. The winter following her execution, Scottow was elected as a town selectman for the first time. Around the same time of his election, Scottow seems to have felt pressured to retract his original support for Hibbins and issue an apology to the court. "He stated that he did not intend to oppose the proceedings of the General Court in the case of Mrs. Ann Hibbins: " I am cordially sorry that anything from me, either in word or writing, should give offense to the honored Court, my dear brethren in the church, or any others."

Scottow finally returned to the same subject almost 40 years later in 1694. This was less than two years after the infamous trials at Salem, which he addresses at length in his, Narrative of the Planting making this work an important contemporary source. Scottow again seems to come down on the side of presumed innocence and against the accusers whose testimony was fickle and inconsistent ("said, and unsaid"). He further blames a departure from the non-superstitious theology taught by Jean Calvin ("Geneva") and embraced by the earlier teachers:, "Can it be rationally supposed:? that had we not receded from having Pastors, Teachers, and Ruling Elders, and Churches doing their duty as formerly... that the Roaring Lion [the father of lies] could have gained so much ground upon us..." Scottow includes a tally, "...above two hundred accused, one hundred imprisoned, thirty condemned, and twenty executed."

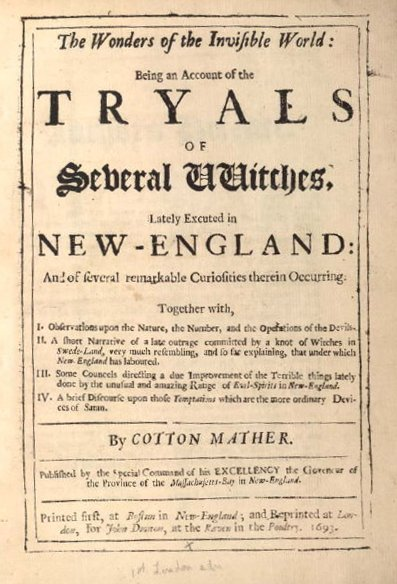
Wonders of the Invisible World-1693

In the previous decade, Increase Mather and his son Cotton Mather, had both been industrious in New England's government and written several books on witchcraft. Scottow was also a close neighbor to one of the judges Samuel Sewall. In bringing the witchcraft trials to an end, Scottow seems to give credit to the relatively unzealous leadership of the governor, the native born William Phips "who being divinely destined, and humanely commissioned, to be the pilot and steersman of this poor be-misted and be-fogged vessel in the Mare Mortuum and mortiforous sea of witchcraft, and fascination; by heaven's conduct according to the integrity of his heart, not trusting the helm in any other hand, he being by God and their Majesties be-trusted therewith, he so happily shaped, and steadily steered her course, as she escaped shipwreck... cutting asunder the Circean knot of Inchantment... hath extricated us out of the winding and crooked labyrinth of Hell's meander."

== Works ==
- A Narrative of the Planting of the Massachusetts Colony (1694) (an 1858 reprint in the Collections of the Massachusetts Historical Society, volume IV of the Fourth Series, p 279-332)
- Old Men's Tears for Their Own Declensions (1691) (Online edition, PDF)
- Scottow edited and published a collection of early documents MASSACHUSETTS: or The first Planters of New-England, The End and Manner of their coming thither, and Abode there: In several EPISTLES (1696) (Online edition, PDF) containing materials by John Winthrop, Thomas Dudley, John Allin, Thomas Shepard, and John Cotton.
- Scottow is also credited with translating portions of an anti-Anabaptist or anti-Quaker work by Guido de Bres, La racine, source et fondement des anabaptistes ou rebaptisez de nostre temps (Rouen, 1565). This was published as Johannes Becoldus Redivivus (London, 1659) and as The Rise, Spring and Foundation of the Anabaptists, or Re-baptized of Our Time (Cambridge, Mass., 1668).
- Anne Myles has recently shown that Scottow was the compiler of Divine Consolations for Mourners in Sion (1664), a work derived from Foxe's Book of Martyrs.
