= Claude de Saint-Étienne de la Tour =

Claude de Saint-Étienne de la Tour (c. 1570 – after 1636) was born in the province of Champagne, France and came to Acadia in 1610 after suffering heavy losses as a ship's captain.

Claude arrived in Acadia to assist Jean de Biencourt de Poutrincourt et de Saint-Just in establishing a permanent colony at Port-Royal, N.S. He was accompanied by his son, Charles de Saint-Étienne de la Tour, and they were initially occupied with the construction of buildings and planting crops.

After the initial colonization effort, it is known that Claude engaged in fur-trading activities in the Penobscot Bay area. It is believed that Fort Pentagouet, a combined trading post and fishing station which he built, was the first permanent settlement in present-day New England. We know that about 1626, Claude de La Tour had to abandon the area to the Plymouth Colony.

Claude returned to France and upon returning to his son's fort at Cap de Sable in the spring of 1628, the ships were captured by the British, under the command of Sir David Kirke, and he was sent as a prisoner to England. He returned to Acadia in 1630 with an English wife and briefly switched allegiance to the British. There was a siege of Fort la Tour by Claude with his son resisting and winning.

Claude was eventually convinced by his son Charles to return to Cap de Sable and French allegiance. He lived his remaining years in that area. He was in receipt of a large land grant and Fort Pentagouët itself by the French Crown although it does not appear that he took residential possession of it.

== Family ==
He married Marie Amador de Salazar, a descendant of Georges de La Trémoille, the Grand Chamberlain of France to King Charles VII of France. She gave him a son, Charles de Saint-Étienne de la Tour.
