= New Holland (Acadia) =

Former Dutch colony in North America

- colony
- Establishment: 1674
- Formal claim: 1676
- Abandonment: 1678

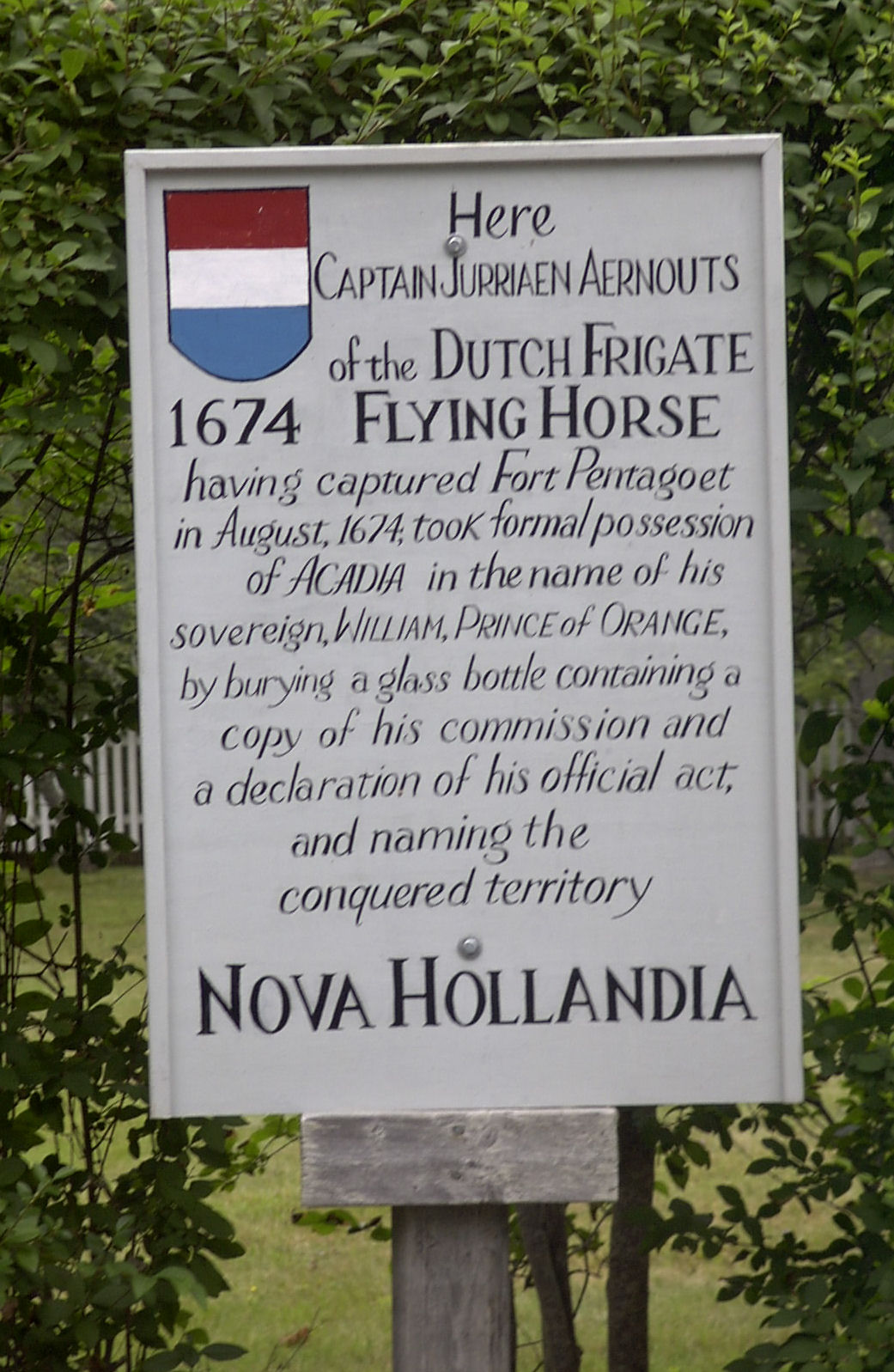
Marker commemorating the Dutch conquest of Acadia (1674), which they renamed New Holland. This is the spot where Jurriaen Aernoutsz buried a bottle at the capital of Acadia, Fort Pentagouet, Castine, Maine.

New Holland (Nova Hollandia) was a Dutch colony in North-America, established by Dutch naval captain Jurriaen Aernoutsz upon seizing the capital of Acadia, Fort Pentagouet in Penobscot Bay (present-day Castine, Maine, United States), and several other Acadian villages during the Franco-Dutch War. The Dutch imprisoned the Governor of Acadia Jacques de Chambly. The French and native allies under the command of St. Castin regained control of the area the following year in 1675; however, a year later the Dutch West India Company appointed Cornelis Steenwijck, a Dutch merchant in New York, governor of the "coasts and countries of Nova Scotia and Acadie." The formal Dutch claim to Acadia (1676) was finally abandoned at the end of the war with the Treaty of Nijmegen in 1678.

== History ==
In 1672, the Franco-Dutch War began, and England allied itself with the French. England and the Netherlands came to terms early in 1674 and then several months later the July day when Captain Jurriaen Aernoutsz sailed into New York harbor. Previously he had been sailing the North Atlantic Ocean looking for English and French ships to attack.

In New York, he met a trader named John Rhoades, a Massachusetts resident thoroughly familiar with the fur trade on the coasts of Maine and Acadia, who told him that the Dutch were no longer at war with the English, but that France had yet to come to terms. Rhoades went on to explain to Aernoutsz that the French colony in Acadia was barely defended and ripe for conquest. Aernoutsz took this suggestion to his a crew and they agreed unanimously. John Rhoades would be the crew's guide.

Aernoutsz with 110 soldiers immediately set sail for the capital of Acadia Fort Pentagouet in Penobscot Bay (present-day Castine, Maine). On 10 Aug 1674, he attacked the capital. There were only 30 French soldiers in the fort and they were lightly armed. The Dutchmen took the fort easily. While they were there they also took the French Military Headquarters. Following this, they sailed to Jemseg and captured another French fort there. At both places, Aernoutsz buried bottles at Fort Pentagouet with messages inside them proclaiming that "Acadie" was to be Dutch possession and henceforward known as Nova Hollandia ("New Holland"). The Dutch took the Governor of Acadia Jacques de Chambly prisoner (along with his ensign, Jean-Vincent d’Abbadie* de Saint-Castin, and Pierre Joybert de Soulanges, who had been captured at Jemseg.)

Aernoutsz sailed to Boston where he disposed of his plunder, even selling the cannon from Fort Pentagouet to the Massachusetts government. Some time in October 1674, he sailed for Curaçao, but left his prisoners and a number of his company in Boston, including John Rhoades.

Aernoutsz’s efforts were soon negated by the action of Massachusetts. John Rhoades and the other men Aernoutsz had left in Boston, acting under Aernoutsz's orders to return to Acadia and maintain possession, began seizing New England vessels coming to trade with the Native Americans. Massachusetts apprehended Rhoades and his cohorts and tried them as pirates. Ultimately they were all released or banished from Massachusetts.

== Aftermath ==
In September 1676, the Dutch West India Company made a belated effort to capitalize on Aernoutsz’s conquest by granting Rhoades a commission to reside and trade in Acadia and by appointing Cornelis van Steenwijck, a Dutch merchant in New York, governor of the "coasts and countries of Nova Scotia and Acadie".

Although the territory was claimed by the Dutch, they had no sustained power over the area. Later in 1676, the two forts were reoccupied by the French. On 20 May 1676, Governor of Acadia Jacques de Chambly was re-established as the governor of Acadia. The dispute over the colony was resolved by the Treaty of Nijmegen in 1678, in which the Dutch withdrew their claim to the colony. The treaty, which did not mention the claim specifically, also ended the Franco-Dutch War.

== See also ==
- New Holland (disambiguation page)
- Acadia
- History of the Acadians
- Military history of Nova Scotia
- History of Maine
- New Netherland
