= 1702 in Canada =

- Decades: 1680s; 1690s; 1700s; 1710s; 1720s
- See also: History of Canada; Timeline of Canadian history; List of years in Canada

Events from the year 1702 in Canada.

== Incumbents ==
- French Monarch: Louis XIV
- English, Scottish and Irish Monarch: William III (until March 8), then Anne

=== Governors ===
- Governor General of New France: Louis-Hector de Callière
- Governor of Acadia: Claude-Sébastien de Villieu then Jacques-François de Monbeton de Brouillan
- Colonial Governor of Louisiana: Sauvolle then Jean-Baptiste Le Moyne de Bienville
- Governor of Plaisance: Joseph de Monic

== Events ==
- Having begun in Europe in 1701, the War of the Spanish Succession spreads to North America (Queen Anne's War) in Acadia and New England.
- 1702-13: The short-lived Peace of Ryswick collapses with the outbreak of the War of the Spanish Succession, which erupts in the colonies as Queen Anne's War. It ends with France losing North American territory to Britain.
- 1702-13: Queen Anne's War—Maine Abenakis and Iroquois from Quebec (Caughnawaga) attack the English colonists on behalf of the French, but lose. The European nations negotiate their settlement at the Treaty of Utrecht (1713); Louis XIV cedes Hudson Bay, Acadia (Nova Scotia) and Newfoundland (but not Cape Breton Island or St. John's Island) to Great Britain.

== Deaths ==
- September 20 - Charles Aubert de La Chesnaye, businessman (born 1632)

== See also ==
- List of years in Canada
