= 1701 in Canada =

- Decades: 1680s; 1690s; 1700s; 1710s; 1720s
- See also: History of Canada; Timeline of Canadian history; List of years in Canada

Events from the year 1701 in Canada.

== Incumbents ==
- French Monarch: Louis XIV
- English, Scottish and Irish Monarch: William III

=== Governors ===
- Governor General of New France: Louis-Hector de Callière
- Governor of Acadia: Claude-Sébastien de Villieu
- Colonial Governor of Louisiana: Sauvolle
- Governor of Plaisance: Joseph de Monic

== Events ==
=== Full date unknown ===
- The Peace of Montreal signed: peace treaty between the Iroquois Confederacy and the French. Considered one of the major events in Canada's history, sometimes called the "great peace."
- Detroit, Michigan founded as Fort Pontchartrain du détroit by Antoine de Lamothe Cadillac.
- War of the Spanish Succession begins in Europe; spreads to North America (Queen Anne's War) in 1702.

== Births ==
- October 15 - Marie-Marguerite d'Youville, founder of the "Grey Nuns" order; died 1771; she was beatified in 1959, the first Canadian-born saint.

== Deaths ==
- April 4 - Guillaume Couture, diplomat in New France (born 1618).

== See also ==
- List of years in Canada
