= 1706 in Canada =

- Decades: 1680s; 1690s; 1700s; 1710s; 1720s
- See also: History of Canada; Timeline of Canadian history; List of years in Canada

Events from the year 1706 in Canada.

== Incumbents ==
- French Monarch: Louis XIV
- English, Scottish and Irish Monarch: Anne

=== Governors ===
- Governor General of New France: Philippe de Rigaud Vaudreuil
- Governor of Acadia: Jacques-François de Monbeton de Brouillan then Daniel d'Auger de Subercase
- Colonial Governor of Louisiana: Jean-Baptiste Le Moyne de Bienville
- Governor of Plaisance: Daniel d'Auger de Subercase then Philippe Pastour de Costebelle

== Events ==
- In 1706, the census of New France was 16,417.

== Births ==
- February 2, 1706: Claude-Godefroy Coquart, missionary (died 1765)
- August 21, 1706: Pierre Nicolas d'Incarville, French Jesuit and amateur botanist (died 1757)
- James Abercrombie, British Army general and commander-in-chief of forces in North America during the French and Indian War (died 1781)

== Deaths ==
- July 9, 1706: Pierre Le Moyne d'Iberville: Canadian-born French explorer who established settlements in what is now southern Louisiana (born 1661).
- October 11, 1706: Marguerite Bourdon (religious order name, Mother Saint-Jean-Baptiste): one of the foundresses of the Hôpital Général in Quebec; known for her work with the poor (born October 12, 1642).
- November 25, Jacques Le Ber merchant and seigneur in Montreal, New France.
