= 1704 in Canada =

- Decades: 1680s; 1690s; 1700s; 1710s; 1720s
- See also: History of Canada; Timeline of Canadian history; List of years in Canada

Events from the year 1704 in Canada.

== Incumbents ==
- French Monarch: Louis XIV
- English, Scottish and Irish Monarch: Anne

=== Governors ===
- Governor General of New France: Philippe de Rigaud Vaudreuil
- Governor of Acadia: Jacques-François de Monbeton de Brouillan
- Colonial Governor of Louisiana: Jean-Baptiste Le Moyne de Bienville
- Governor of Plaisance: Daniel d'Auger de Subercase

== Events ==
- French forces destroy the English settlement at Bonavista, Newfoundland.
