= 1700 in Canada =

- Decades: 1680s; 1690s; 1700s; 1710s; 1720s
- See also: History of Canada; Timeline of Canadian history; List of years in Canada

Events from the year 1700 in Canada.

== Incumbents ==
- French Monarch: Louis XIV
- English, Scottish and Irish Monarch: William III

=== Governors ===
- Governor General of New France: Louis-Hector de Callière
- Governor of Acadia: Claude-Sébastien de Villieu
- Colonial Governor of Louisiana: Sauvolle
- Governor of Plaisance: Joseph de Monic

== Events ==
- January 26, 1700- The Cascadia earthquake, one of the largest earthquakes on record, ruptures the Cascadia subduction zone offshore from Vancouver Island to northern California, creating a tsunami that wiped out the winter village of Pachena Bay leaving no survivors.

=== Full date unknown ===
- By now, it is clear that New France is not going to be self-sufficient.
- Population of Acadia is 1,400.
- Sir Stephen Evans is Governor of the Hudson's Bay Company between the years 1700 to 1712.

== Births ==
- June 17 - François-Marie Bissot, Sieur de Vincennes, explorer and soldier. (died 1736)

=== Full date unknown ===
- Joseph Adams, chief factor of the Hudson's Bay Company. (died 1737)

== Deaths ==
- January 12 - Marguerite Bourgeoys (born Troyes, France on April 17, 1620), a first school teacher in Montreal and founder of the congregation of Notre Dame (the first order of uncloistered nuns in North America).

=== Full date unknown ===
- Louis Jolliet was one of the first people of European descent born in North America to be remembered for significant discoveries. (born 1645)

== See also ==
- List of years in Canada
