= 1708 in Canada =

- Decades: 1680s; 1690s; 1700s; 1710s; 1720s
- See also: History of Canada; Timeline of Canadian history; List of years in Canada

Events from the year 1708 in Canada.

== Incumbents ==
- French Monarch: Louis XIV
- British and Irish Monarch: Anne

=== Governors ===
- Governor General of New France: Philippe de Rigaud Vaudreuil
- Governor of Acadia: Daniel d'Auger de Subercase
- Colonial Governor of Louisiana: Jean-Baptiste Le Moyne de Bienville
- Governor of Plaisance: Philippe Pastour de Costebelle

== Births ==
- Christopher Dufrost de La Jemeraye born December 6 of this year. Already in ill health, he died while travelling from Fort Maurepas (Canada) on the Red River to Fort St. Charles on Lake of the Woods. He was buried near the junction of the Red and Roseau rivers (died 1736).

== Deaths ==
- May 6 - François de Laval, 1st Bishop of Quebec (born 1623)
