= John Leverett =

Governor of Massachusetts Bay Colony and Nova Scotia (1616-1679)

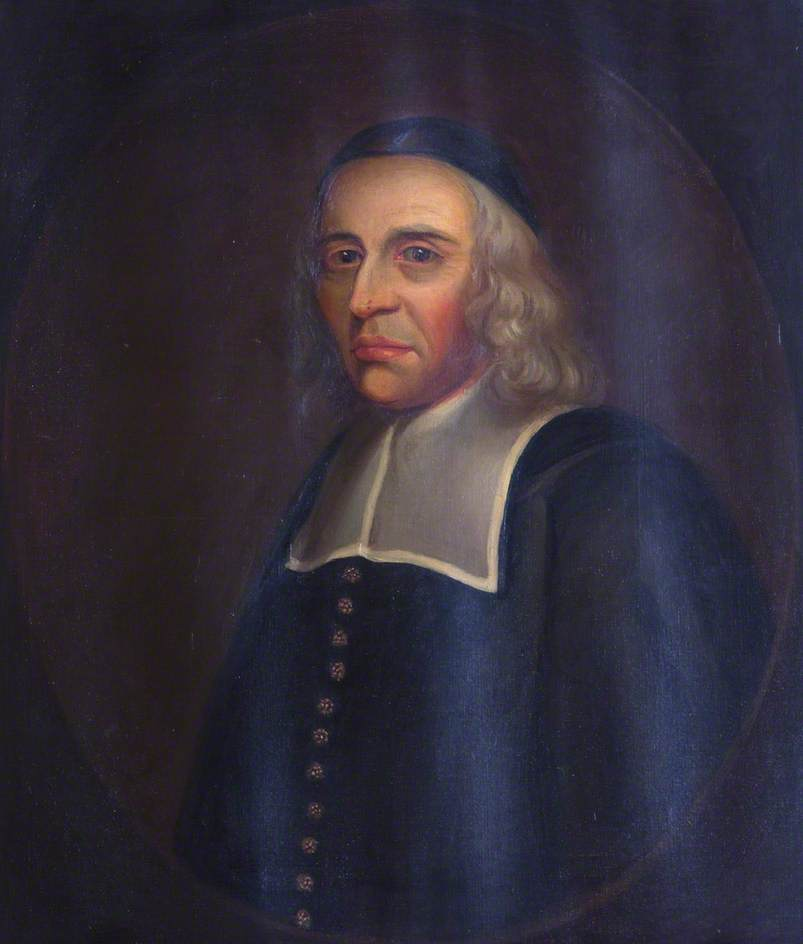
- Portrait of Leverett

Governor of Acadia/Nova Scotia (military)
- In office 1654–1657
- Preceded by: Charles de Saint-Étienne de la Tour
- Succeeded by: Sir Thomas Temple (as proprietor of Nova Scotia)

19th Governor of the Massachusetts Bay Colony
- In office 1673–1679
- Preceded by: Richard Bellingham
- Succeeded by: Simon Bradstreet

Personal details
- Born: baptized 7 July 1616 Boston, Lincolnshire, England
- Died: 16 March 1679 (aged 62–63) Boston, Massachusetts Bay Colony
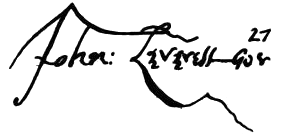
- Signature

Military service
- Allegiance: Parliament army Massachusetts Bay Colony militia
- Years of service: 1644–1648 (Parliament army); 1649–1673 (Massachusetts militia)
- Rank: Captain (Parliament army); Major-general (Massachusetts militia)
- Commands: Massachusetts militia
- Battles/wars: English Civil War

John Leverett (baptized 7 July 1616 – 16 March 1678/79 (Note: In the Julian calendar, then in use in England, the year began on 25 March. To avoid confusion with dates in the Gregorian calendar, then in use in other parts of Europe, dates between January and March were often written with both years. Dates in this article are in the Julian calendar unless otherwise noted.)) was an English colonial magistrate, merchant, soldier and the penultimate governor of the Massachusetts Bay Colony. Born in England, he migrated to Massachusetts as a teenager. He was a leading merchant in the colony, and served in its military. In the 1640s he went back to England to fight in the English Civil War.

As a Puritan he nonetheless was opposed to the strict Puritan religious orthodoxy in the colony. He also believed the colonial government was not within the power of the English crown and government, a politically hardline position that contributed to the eventual revocation of the colonial charter in 1684. His business and military activities were sometimes intermingled, leading some in the colony to view him unfavorably. However, he was popular with his troops, and was repeatedly elected governor of the colony from 1673 until his death in 1679. He oversaw the colonial actions in King Philip's War, and expanded the colony's territories by purchasing land claims in present-day Maine.

== Early life ==
John Leverett was baptized 7 July 1616 at St Botolph's Church in Boston, Lincolnshire. His father, Thomas Leverett, was a close associate of John Cotton, the church's Puritan pastor, and served as one of the church's elders. Nothing is known of his mother, Anne Fisher, beyond that she bore her husband 16 children. Of John Leverett's youth nothing is known prior to the family's departure for the New World in 1633. By the early 1630s Leverett's father was an alderman in Boston, and had acquired, in partnership with John Beauchamp of the Plymouth Council for New England, a grant now known as the Waldo Patent for land in what is now the state of Maine. When the family arrived in the Massachusetts Bay Colony it settled in the capital, also called Boston. Leverett married Hannah Hudson in 1639. They had a son, Hudson, in 1640; Hannah died in 1643. In 1640 Leverett was made a freeman.

In 1639 he joined the Artillery Company of Massachusetts. The Artillery Company was a focal point in the colony for people who disagreed with the orthodoxy of the colony's Puritan leaders. Many of its leading members, Leverett among them, opposed the colonial crackdowns on religious dissenters. Its members also engaged in trade. Leverett frequently partnered with Edward Gibbons and Major General Robert Sedgwick in trading ventures. He was, for example, part owner with Gibbons of a ship lost off the Virginia coast. The mixture of military leadership and commercial enterprise sometimes led to conflicts of interest. In the 1640s, Gibbons convinced Governor John Winthrop to allow Massachusetts volunteers to assist French Acadian Governor Charles de la Tour in his dispute with Charles de Menou d'Aulnay. Gibbons had negotiated exclusive trading privileges with la Tour in exchange for this help, and Leverett was also able to secure preferential trading privileges with the French.

== English Civil War ==
In about 1644 Leverett went to England, where he fought in the Parliamentary cause for Oliver Cromwell in the English Civil War. He had a military command in the cavalry of Thomas Rainsborough, where he supposedly served with distinction. He returned home in 1645, but may have gone back to England in the following years. He married Robert Sedgwick's daughter Sarah in 1645. The couple had 12 children, of whom only six survived to adulthood.

Leverett's time in England brought him to a belief in the need for more religious tolerance. He would pursue the idea politically, often in the face of opposition from the conservative Puritan leadership of Massachusetts that opposed religious views that did not accord with their own. He specifically opposed the Cambridge Platform describing New England church orthodoxy, and opposed punishments of nonconforming individuals when he sat as a deputy in the Massachusetts general court (the colonial legislature). John Winthrop, in writing about the 1648 synod that adopted the platform, noted that those "who came lately from England" were strongly opposed to its resolutions.

== Massachusetts politics ==
Leverett became active in local politics after becoming a freeman in 1640. In 1642 Leverett and Edward Hutchinson were sent as diplomatic envoys to negotiate with the Narragansett chief Miantonomoh amid concerns that all of the local Indian tribes were conspiring to wage war on the English colonists. Miantonomoh went to Boston and convinced Governor Winthrop that the rumors they had heard were groundless. Leverett would be called on for diplomatic missions in future administrations as well.

Following his return from England, he resumed his political activities. He was elected as one of Boston's two representatives in the colony's general court in 1651, and served a brief stint as Speaker of the House. Throughout the 1650s and 1660s he served five terms on the general court.

Leverett was a popular leader of the colonial militia, something that resulted in an unusual situation caused by the colony's militia laws. The colony had voted to limit the size of its militia companies, and restricted their officers to hold only one post. In 1652, when Leverett was captain of a Suffolk County company of horse, he was also elected as a captain of one of Boston infantry companies as well as captain of the Artillery Company of Massachusetts. The colonial magistrates refused to grant him an exemption from the rule, and he was required to give up the Boston post. He was, apparently, allowed to retain his captaincy of the Artillery Company as the company was exempt from regulations governing the militia.

Governor John Endecott

Governor John Endecott in 1652 sent a survey party to determine the colony's northern boundary, which was specified by the charter to be 3 miles (4.8 km) north of the Merrimack River. This survey party discovered (incorrectly) that the northern limit of the Merrimack was near what is now known as Lake Winnipesaukee in New Hampshire. An east–west boundary at this latitude was found to include a number small settlements in what is now southern Maine. Endecott sent Leverett as one of several commissioners to negotiate the inclusion of these settlements into the colonial government, which resulted in the eventual formation of York County, Massachusetts. Leverett became interested in developing more land in Maine as result of this and other official visits, and invested in a significant amount of land there, over and above the lands inherited from his father.

In 1655 he was formally appointed as the Massachusetts colony's agent in England. It is unclear, given the overlap with his governance in Acadia, when he actually went to England, but he served in this capacity until 1662. During the 1650s when Cromwell was Lord Protector the colony benefited from the relationship he had cultivated with Cromwell during the civil war. In particular, Cromwell took no steps to enforce the 1651 Navigation Act against the colony's merchants, and also overlooked complaints about the colony's repressive tactics against religious nonconformists. The latter occurred despite Leverett's personal opposition to the colony's extreme stance on religion. A common claim that Leverett was knighted by Charles II lacks a solid foundation in the documentary record.

== Military rule of Acadia and Nova Scotia ==
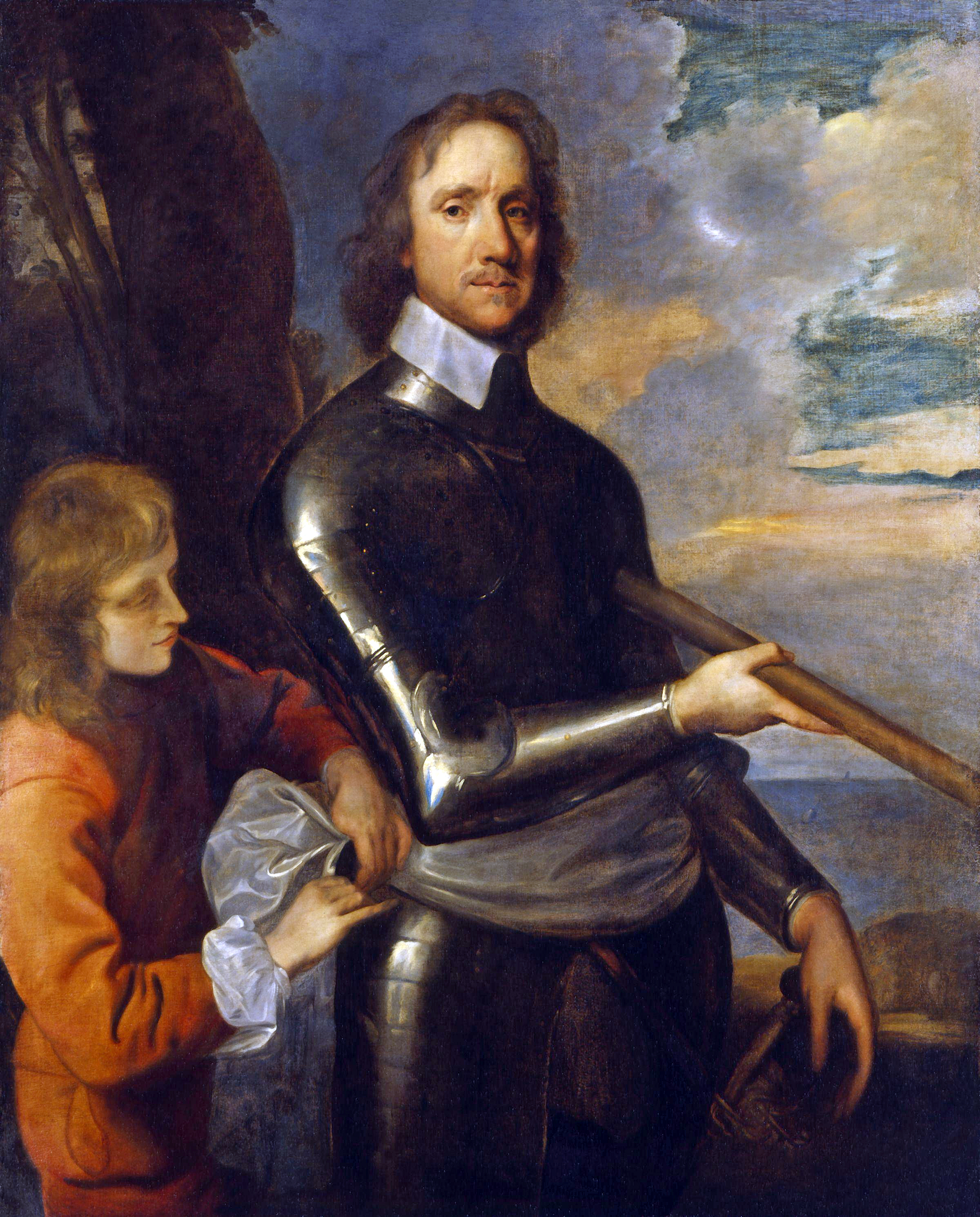
Oliver Cromwell, with whom Leverett had good relations

In 1651 England and the Netherlands went to war. Word of this arrived in the New World in 1652, and rumors flew around the English colonies of New England that the Dutch in New Amsterdam were conspiring with all of the region's Indians to make war against them. Leverett and Robert Sedgwick both saw a significant benefit for their trading operations if the Dutch could be eliminated as competitors, and lobbied for military action against New Amsterdam, although religious moderates like Simon Bradstreet were opposed to it. New Amsterdam's Director-General Peter Stuyvesant invited a delegation from New England colonies to New Amsterdam to discuss the matter. Leverett was one of the commissioners sent in 1653; he took careful note of the colony's defenses while he was there. The New Haven Colony petitioned the Commonwealth government of Oliver Cromwell for assistance against the Dutch threat, a position supported by Leverett, who went to England with Sedgwick in 1653 to press the colonial case for war.

Cromwell responded by giving Sedgwick a commission as military commander of the New England coast, and sent him and Leverett with several ships and some troops to make war on the Dutch. The fleet was to be augmented by a force of 500 New Englanders under Leverett's command. By the time the New England force was raised in 1654, peace had been made between the English and Dutch. Sedgwick took advantage of his commission to act instead against the French in neighboring Acadia, which was home to privateers who preyed on English shipping. He captured the principal Acadian ports of Port Royal and Fort Pentagouet in July 1654. Sedgwick gave military command of the province to Leverett. Leverett governed Nova Scotia for three years, turning command over to Sir Thomas Temple in May 1657. During this time he and Sedgwick enforced a virtual trade monopoly on French Acadia for their benefit, leading some in the colony to view Leverett as a predatory opportunist. Leverett funded much of the cost of the occupation himself, and then petitioned Cromwell's government for reimbursement. Although Cromwell authorized payment, he made it contingent on the colony performing an audit of Leverett's finances, which never took place. Leverett was consequently still petitioning for compensation after the Restoration (1660).

== Military command and governorship ==
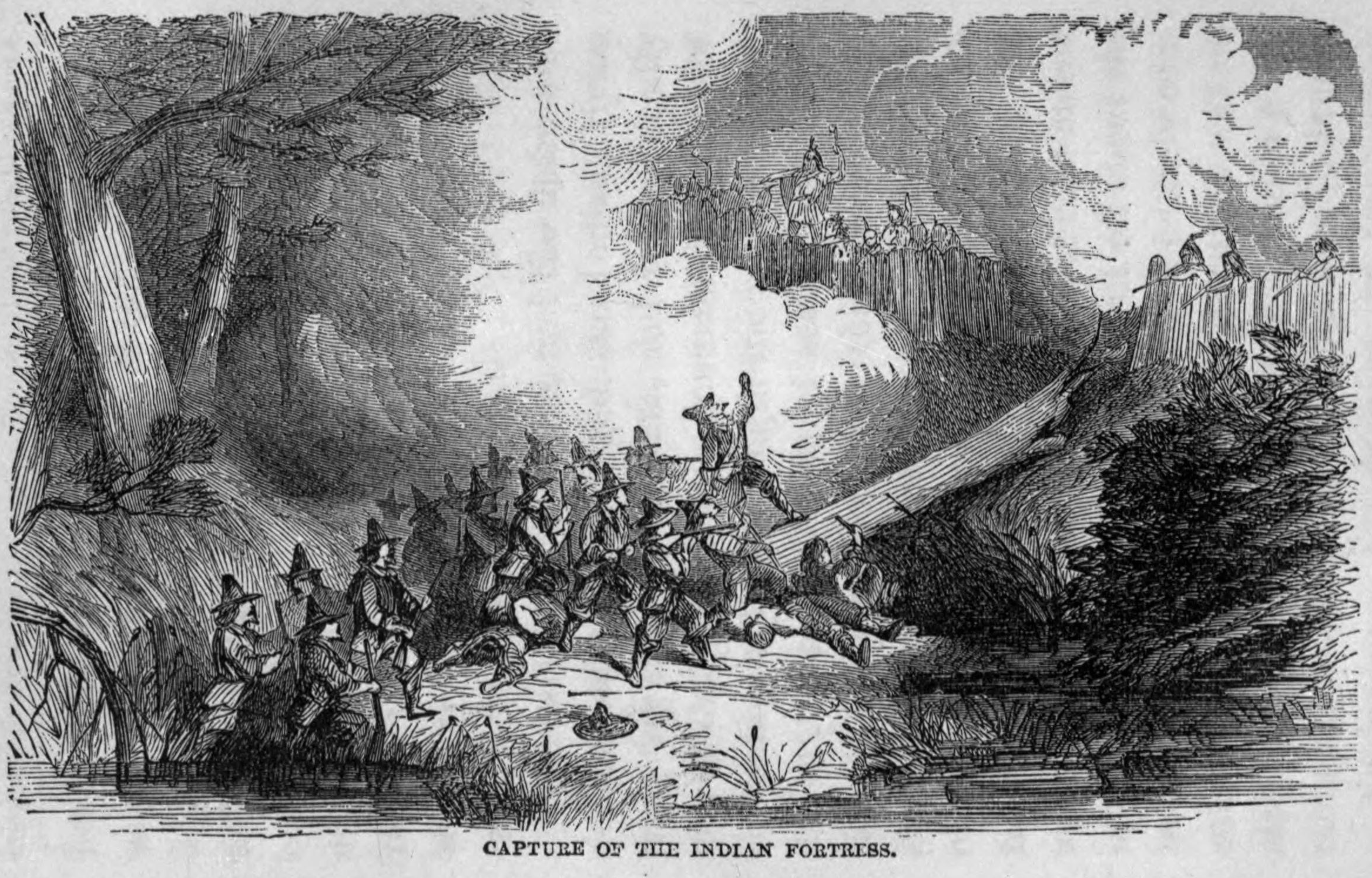
An engraving depicting the capture of the Wampanoag fort at Mount Hope in 1675 during King Philip's War

From 1663 to 1673, Leverett held the rank of major-general of the Massachusetts militia, and was repeatedly elected as a deputy to the general court or to the council of assistants. During this time he oversaw the strengthening of Boston's defenses. He was also again sent to the colonial settlements of New Hampshire and southern Maine, where some colonists had objected to Massachusetts rule and arrested colonial officials.

Following the restoration of Charles II to the throne, all of England's colonies came under his scrutiny. In 1665, the Carr-Cartwright Commission visited Massachusetts. They were instructed to gain the colony's agreement to terms demanded by Charles in a letter he sent to the colonial government in 1662, in which he instructed the colony to adopt more tolerant religious laws, and to enforce the Navigation Acts. The arrival of the commissioners was of some concern to the government, and Leverett was placed on a committee to draft a petition to the king demanding the commission's recall. The document they drafted characterized the commissioners as "agents of evil sent to Massachusetts to subvert its charter and destroy its independence."

In 1665, those four commissioners validated a previous 1662 royal ruling which declared Massachusetts had no authority over Maine. When the commissioners left New England in 1668, Leverett led a counter-coup against the government established in Maine by them in order to reassert Massachusetts authority. On July 14, 1668 he, Richard Waldron, Edward Tyng (father of Edward Tyng, Robert Pike and 12 cavalrymen rode into York, Maine and deposed the officials and swore in new military officers and court officials.

Leverett served as deputy governor under governor Richard Bellingham from 1671 to 1672, and succeeded to his position after the governor's death. His tenure as governor was chiefly notable because of King Philip's War, and the rising threats to the colonial charter that culminated in its revocation in 1684. The colony angered the king by purchasing the claims of Sir Ferdinando Gorges to portions of Maine in 1677, a territory Charles had intended to acquire for his son, the Duke of Monmouth. Edward Randolph, sent by Charles to report on the New England colonies, reported in 1676 that Leverett believed the colony to be beyond the crown's reach: "He freely declared to me that the laws made by your Majesty and your Parliament obligeth them in nothing but what consists with the interest of that colony".

Although Leverett favored religious tolerance, there were still many in the colony who did not. Baptists were able to openly begin worship in Boston during his tenure, but he has also been criticized by Quaker historians for harsh anti-Quaker laws passed in 1677. The Baptists' time in Boston did not last, and they were thrown out in 1680 after Simon Bradstreet became governor.

== Death and legacy ==
Coat of Arms of John Leverett

Leverett died in office, reportedly from complications of kidney stones, on 16 March 1678/9, and was interred at the King's Chapel Burying Ground in Boston. His descendants include his grandson John, the seventh President of Harvard College, and Leverett Saltonstall, a 20th-century governor of Massachusetts. Leverett, Massachusetts, is named for his grandson.

Cotton Mather wrote of Leverett that he was "one to whom the affections of the freemen were signalised his quick advances through the lesser stages of honor and office, unto the highest in the country; and one whose courage had been as much recommended by martial actions abroad in his younger years, as his wisdom and justice were now at home in his elder."

== Bibliography ==
- Breen, Louise A (2001). Transgressing the Bounds: Subversive Enterprises Among the Puritan Elite in Massachusetts, 1630–1692. Oxford: Oxford University Press. ISBN 978-0-19-513800-9. OCLC 213296589.
- Bridgeman, Thomas (1856). The Pilgrims of Boston and their Descendants. New York: D. Appleton and Company. pp. 43–44.
- Fergusson, C. Bruce (1979) [1966]. "Leverett, John". In Brown, George Williams (ed.). Dictionary of Canadian Biography. Vol. I (1000–1700) (online ed.). University of Toronto Press.
- Hall, Michael Garibaldi (1960). Edward Randolph and the American Colonies. Chapel Hill, NC: University of North Carolina Press. OCLC 181784.
- Hill, Hamilton Andrews (1895). The Trade and Commerce of Boston, 1630 to 1890. Boston, MA: Damrell and Upham. OCLC 7676661.
- Holifield, E. Brooks (June 1969). "On Toleration in Massachusetts". Church History. 38 (2). American Society of Church History: 188–200. doi:10.2307/3162706. JSTOR 3162706. S2CID 163026029.
- Klein, Milton (2006). The Empire State: A History of New York. Ithaca, NY: Cornell University Press. ISBN 978-0-8014-8991-4. OCLC 65285709.
- Leverett, Charles Edward (1856). A Memoir Biographical and Genealogical, of Sir John Leverett, Knt., Governor of Massachusetts, 1673–79. Boston, MA: Crosby, Nichols. OCLC 7387840.
- Lucas, Paul (January 1967). "Colony or Commonwealth: Massachusetts Bay, 1661–1666". The William and Mary Quarterly. 24 (Third Series, Volume 24, No. 1). Omohundro Institute of Early American History and Culture: 88–107. doi:10.2307/1920563. JSTOR 1920563.
- Martin, John Frederick (1991). Profits in the Wilderness: Entrepreneurship and the Founding of New England Towns in the Seventeenth Century. Chapel Hill, NC: University of North Carolina Press. ISBN 978-0-8078-2001-8. OCLC 231347624.
- Mayo, Lawrence Shaw (1936). John Endecott. Cambridge, MA: Harvard University Press. OCLC 1601746.
- Moore, Jacob Bailey (1851). Lives of the Governors of New Plymouth and Massachusetts Bay. Boston: C. D. Strong. p. 367. OCLC 11362972.
- Moore, Susan Hardman (2007). Pilgrims: New World Settlers & the Call of Home. New Haven, CT: Yale University Press. ISBN 978-0-300-11718-9. OCLC 122337947.
- Nason, Elias (1874). A Gazetteer of the State of Massachusetts. Boston, MA: B. B. Russell. p. 293. OCLC 1728892.
- New England Historic Genealogical Society (1881). Report of its Heraldic Committee on the Subject: Was Gov. Leverett a Knight?. David Clapp & Son. OCLC 558014968.
- Roberts, Oliver Ayers (1895). History of the Military Company of the Massachusetts. Vol. 1. Boston, MA: A. Mudge and son. OCLC 1394719.
- Roberts, William I., 3rd (1979) [1966]. "Sedgwick, Robert". In Brown, George Williams (ed.). Dictionary of Canadian Biography. Vol. I (1000–1700) (online ed.). University of Toronto Press.

Government offices
Preceded by Charles de Saint-Étienne de la Tour	Governor of Acadia (military); 1654–1657	Succeeded by Sir Thomas Temple as proprietor of Nova Scotia
Preceded by Richard Bellingham	Governor of the Massachusetts Bay Colony; 1673–1679	Succeeded by Simon Bradstreet
