= Philippe Mius d'Entremont =

Philippe Mius d’Entremont, 1st Baron of Pobomcoup
- Born: c. 1609; Normandy, France
- Died: 1701; Grand-Pré, Nova Scotia

Philippe Mius d’Entremont, 1st Baron of Pobomcoup (c. 1609–1701) was an early settler of Acadia, and progenitor of the Muise and d’Entremont families of Nova Scotia.

== Biography ==
Philippe Mius d’Entremont was born in Normandy, France, and he was expelled from France because of his daughter's marriage and was sent to Acadia with his family in 1651 as a lieutenant-major with Charles de Saint-Étienne de la Tour, who had been named Governor of Acadia by Louis XIII first in 1631 and again by Louis XIV in 1651. The governor in July 1653 awarded him one of the few fiefs to constitute territory in North America, the first in Acadia, and the second in Canada, the Barony of Pobomcoup. The fiefdom, which operated under the same conditions as Europe's feudal system, is one of many solid pieces of evidence that Philippe was a noble in France.

Pobomcoup, meaning in Mi'kmaq "land from which the trees have been removed to fit it for cultivation", extended from Cap-Nègre (Clyde River) to Cap-Fourchu (Yarmouth). He promoted agriculture on his seigneury and brought to his estate several indentured workers and a few families from Port-Royal. The settlement and Mius d'Entremont's residence were established at Pubnico, the modern spelling of Pobomcoup.

Pubnico is considered the oldest village in Nova Scotia still occupied by the Acadians and the oldest village in Canada still occupied by the descendants of its founder.

In 1654, d'Entremont was captured by Major General Robert Sedgwick, who added Acadia to the British dominions after capturing the forts of Saint John, Port Royal, and the settlement of Penobscot. He did not resurface with his family until the colony was restored to France in 1670. He was then created a procureur du roi (King's attorney) in Acadia by Governor Hector d'Andigné de Grandfontaine, a post he retained until 1687. At an advanced age, he left his seigneurial estate, bequeathing the title of baron to his eldest son Jacques, and resided with his eldest daughter until he died in 1701.

The barony of Pobomcoup remained in the family until the expulsion of the Acadians, which began in 1755 by the British.

== Family ==
Born circa 1609, Philippe married Madeleine Hélie in Normandy and had the following children:

=== Children ===
1. Marguerite Mius d'Entremont (1649–1714), married Pierre Melanson, founder of Grand-Pré
2. Jacques Mius d'Entremont, 2nd Baron of Pobomcoup (1654–1736), married Anne de Saint-Étienne de la Tour, daughter of Charles de Saint-Étienne de la Tour
3. Abraham Mius d'Entremont (1658–1702), married Marguerite de Saint-Étienne de la Tour, sister of Anne de Saint-Étienne de la Tour
4. Philippe Mius d'Azy (1660- ), married a Mi'kmaq woman and became the progenitor of the Meuse and Muise families
5. Madeleine Mius d'Entremont (1669- )

An unsigned letter that has been attributed to H. Léander d'Entremont claims that Philippe was the same person as François Virgine, the son of Claude Antoine d'Albon de Montauban de Meuillon and Béatrix de Coligny, the latter of whom was the daughter of Gaspard II de Coligny and Jacqueline de Montbel d'Entremont. However, neither Stephen A. White, a well-known Acadian genealogist, nor the Dictionary of Canadian Biography, identify Philippe's parents.

== See also ==
- Port-Royal (Acadia)
- Canadian peers and baronets
