= 1707 in Canada =

- Decades: 1680s; 1690s; 1700s; 1710s; 1720s
- See also: History of Canada; Timeline of Canadian history; List of years in Canada

Events from the year 1707 in Canada.

== Incumbents ==
- French Monarch: Louis XIV
- English, Scottish and Irish Monarch (until May 1, 1707), British and Irish Monarch (beginning May 1, 1707): Anne

=== Governors ===
- Governor General of New France: Philippe de Rigaud Vaudreuil
- Governor of Acadia: Daniel d'Auger de Subercase
- Colonial Governor of Louisiana: Jean-Baptiste Le Moyne de Bienville
- Governor of Plaisance: Philippe Pastour de Costebelle

== Events ==
- Port Royal is attacked twice by the English from Massachusetts.

== Deaths ==
- Jean-Vincent d'Abbadie de Saint-Castin (born 1652)
