= Biencourt =

Biencourt may refer to:

== Places ==
- Biencourt, Quebec, Canada
- Biencourt, Somme, France
- Biencourt-sur-Orge, Meuse, France

== People ==
- Charles de Biencourt de Saint-Just (1591/1592 - 1623/1624), French nobleman and military officer
- Jean de Biencourt de Poutrincourt et de Saint-Just (1557–1615), French nobleman and colonial governor
