= Agathe de Saint Etienne de La Tour =

Acadian landowner (1690–1765)

- Born: 1690; Cape Sable
- Died: 1765 (aged 74–75); Kilkenny

Agathe de Saint Etienne de La Tour (1690 – in or after 1765) was an Acadian landowner.

== Life ==
Tour was born in Cape Sable Island in 1690. Her parents were Anne Melanson and Jacques de Saint Etienne de La Tour and her grandfather was Charles de Saint-Étienne de la Tour, who had been a Governor of Acadia. She married twice; her first husband was called Edward Bradstreet and her second was called Campbell. Her seven children included the British officer John Bradstreet.

Agathe came to notice after she successfully made a claim to Canadian land based on her grandfather's rights. This opportunity arose in 1729 when she was a widow. The governor Richard Griffiths had decided to re-organise the existing grants of land that had been made in Nova Scotia. Her family had inherited shares in substantial lands from a grant made to them in 1703 by the French king. In fact, she owned only 25% of this claim but she was able to show that her relatives had transferred the other 75% to her control. She made claims in 1725 and 1730, and in 1732 she went to present her case to the Board of Trade in London. Despite the doubts of Griffiths, the Board of Trade ruled in her favour and they decreed that she should be paid £2,000 in exchange for her rights to the lands. William Popple of the Board of Trade noted that she was not well and paid her in 1734 to avoid having to negotiate with her children following her death.

Tour died in Kilkenny after or in 1765.
