= 1618 in Quebec =

Events from the year 1618 in Quebec.

== Events ==
- In a memoria to king Louis XIII, Samuel de Champlain proposes that the French should start to convert the First Nations in North America. This marks the start of a process that will have wide-reaching consequences in the colony.
- Jean Nicolet arrives in Quebec. Like Étienne Brûlé before him, Nicolet is sent to live among the natives in order to learn their language and function as a link between them and the French colonists. Nicolet settles among the Algonquins on Allumette island in the Ottawa River.

== Births ==
- Médard des Groseilliers, explorer and coureur des bois (d. 1696).
- January 4 - Guillaume Couture, diplomat in New France (d. 1701).
