= Governor Temple =

Governor Temple may refer to:

- Sir Richard Temple, 1st Baronet (1826–1902), Governor of Bombay from 1877 to 1880
- Thomas Temple (1613/14–1674), Governor of Acadia and Nova Scotia from 1657 to 1670
- William Temple (politician) (1814–1863), 35th Governor of Delaware
