= Governor Bradstreet =

Governor Bradstreet may refer to:

- John Bradstreet (1714–1774), Governor of Newfoundland in 1747
- Simon Bradstreet (1603–1697), 20th and 21st Governor of the Massachusetts Bay Colony from 1679 to 1686
