= Simon-Pierre Denys de Bonaventure =

Canadian politician

Simon-Pierre Denys de Bonaventure (22 June 1659 – 7 February 1711) was born in Trois-Rivières, Québec to Pierre Denys de La Ronde and Catherine Le Neuf.

He became an officer in the colonial troupes de la marine of New France and was heavily involved with the events of Acadia from 1685 until his death. In 1690, with Pierre Le Moyne d'Iberville, he attacked York Fort, in Hudson Bay. He participated in the naval battles off St. John, in 1691 and in 1696. Together with Jean-Vincent d’Abbadie and Iberville, Bonaventure led the Siege of Pemaquid (1696). He governed Acadia in the interim after the death of Governor Jacques-François de Monbeton de Brouillan, in September 1705, until the appointment of the new governor, Daniel d'Auger de Subercase, on 22 May 1706.

He is credited with designing the Bonaventure hatchet, a spike tomahawk which was used during the Second Indian War, the first of the French and Indian Wars.

Political offices
Preceded by Jacques-François de Monbeton de Brouillan	Governor of Acadia (acting); 1705–1706	Succeeded by Daniel d'Auger de Subercase
