= John Fullartine =

British colonial official

John Fullartine (c. 1652 – October 1738) was governor of the Hudson's Bay Company in the James Bay area of Canada. He replaced James Knight and was replaced by Anthony Beale in 1705.
