= Alexandre Le Borgne de Belle-Isle =

Governor of Acadia, Seigneur of Port Royal and Seigneur of Les Mines

Alexandre le Borgne de Belle-Isle (1640 – c. 1693), the son of Emmanuel Le Borgne, was a temporary governor of Acadia and seigneur of Port Royal. Around 1675, he married Marie de Saint-Étienne de La Tour, daughter of Charles de Saint-Étienne de La Tour and Jeanne Motin de Reux, widow of Acadian Governor, Charles de Menou d'Aulnay. In 1690, he was an interpreter in the negotiation of the surrender of Port Royal to William Phips.

Le Borgne inherited his rights in Acadia from his father, who, in turn, claimed the governorship and seigneurial rights in Acadia on the death of d'Aulnay in 1650, due to large debts owed. Although the governorship passed to Hector d'Andigné de Grandfontaine in 1670, Le Borgne exercised seigneurial rights over Port Royal until his death.

The seigneurial rights asserted by the Le Borgne father and son since 1650 were always disputed by the heirs of d'Aulnay, and would be settled by an edict from the French Royal Council in 1703.
