= William Crowne =

Governor of Nova Scotia

William Crowne (1617–1682) had a varied career as an officer of arms, a member of parliament, a colonel during the English Civil War, and a joint proprietor of the English colony of Nova Scotia. He was also the father of the playwright John Crowne.

== Early and personal life ==
Coat of Arms of William Crowne

Different sources have Crowne's birthdate as 1608, 1617 or as late as 1620, but little is known of his early life and education.

As a young man he accompanied his master the Earl of Arundel to Germany and wrote a book about his travels called "A true relation of all the remarkable places and passages observed in the travels of the right honourable Thomas Lord Hovvard, Earle of Arundell and Surrey, Primer Earle, and Earle Marshall of England, ambassadour extraordinary to his sacred Majesty Ferdinando the second, emperour of Germanie, anno Domini 1636. By Wiliam Crowne Gentleman, London". As Earl Marshal, Howard controlled appointments to the College of Arms; in 1638 he appointed Crowne Rouge Dragon Pursuivant, one of the four junior officers of arms. Crowne continued to hold this office, even while in North America, until his resignation in 1661.

Between 1635 and 1640 Crowne married Agnes Watts (née Mackworth), widow of Richard Watts (the son of alderman and Lord Mayor of London John Watts) and sister of Humphrey Mackworth, later governor of Shrewsbury and a member of Cromwell's Council of State. Crowne and his wife had 3 children, of whom the eldest, John became a well-known dramatist.

== In the Civil War ==
At the outbreak of the English Civil War Crowne declared for the Parliamentary cause. From 1641 to at least 1644 he was secretary to Basil Feilding, 2nd Earl of Denbigh; by 1649 he was serving in the same capacity to his brother-in-law. On 2 April 1650 Crowne was granted a commission as captain, and just over two weeks later was promoted to lieutenant-colonel, again under his brother-in-law Humphrey Mackworth. In 1654 he was elected as MP for Bridgnorth. During the 1650s Crowne also served as a justice of the peace.

== Proprietorship of Nova Scotia ==
In 1656 Crowne and Colonel Thomas Temple become joint proprietors of the province of Nova Scotia, after buying out Charles de Saint-Étienne de la Tour. The following year Crowne with his son John (but not his wife), Temple and a group of settlers moved to North America. Crown and Temple divided the province between them in February 1658, with Crowne taking the western part, and building a trading post at "Negu," or "Negu alias Cadascat", on the Penobscot River. In September of that year he leased his territory to a Captain Corwin and Ensign Scottee, then in 1659 he leased it to Temple for a period of four years, at a rate of £110 per annum. Temple did not pay the lease after the first year, but remained in possession of the territory. During this period he was living in Boston, Massachusetts, of which he was made a Freeman on 30 May 1660. (Note: Archibald MacMechan in John Crowne: A Biographical Note gives a different version of events. According to him Crowne renamed Negue as Crownespoint, and also built a fort on Penobscot island. Crowne then built up a beaver trade which was so successful that Temple took both forts and all their contents away by force. Temple's arrangement to lease Crowne's territory, according to MacMechan, did not come about until after the two had returned from defending their grant in England.)

With the Restoration in 1660 Crowne returned to England to participate in the coronation of Charles II, and to defend his claim to Nova Scotia. The grant to Crowne and Temple had been made by Cromwell under the Commonwealth; now that Charles had ascended the throne there were a number of other claimants. These included Thomas Elliot (a groom of the bedchamber to Charles II), Sir Lewis Kirke and others (who had taken Acadia in the expedition against Quebec in 1632), and heirs of Sir William Alexander (the original grantee, from whom Charles de la Tour's father had obtained the grant). In 1661 the French Ambassador claimed the territory for France. Temple returned to England in 1662 and was successful in obtaining a new grant as well as a commission as governor. He promised to restore Crowne's territory and make reparations, but did not. Crowne pursued this in the New England courts, but was unsuccessful, the courts eventually deciding they did not have jurisdiction.

== American colonist ==
From 1662 to 1667 Crowne lived in Boston and Roxbury. In 1667 he moved to the recently established town of Mendon, Massachusetts, and was appointed as the town's first clerk and selectman. In that same year Charles II ceded Nova Scotia, and thus Crowne's property, to the French under the Treaty of Breda. Crowne's time in Mendon was marked by frequent disputes with his neighbours over financial matters.

In 1674 Crowne was living in Prudence Island, near Newport, Rhode Island. In that year he was ordered by the General Court of Massachusetts to return to his wife, who had not accompanied him to North America, or face a £20 fine. Her date of death is unknown. By 1679 Crowne was living in Boston, where he died on 24 December 1682. Below is a copy of his will.

I William Crowne Esq. being very weak in body, but of sound mind and memory, and looking every day to be received to glory w'ch God hath given me some comfort of thinking fitting to set down how I would have my estate disposed of when I am dead:

As concerning w't his Maj'tie hath promised to give me concerning the delivery of my right up to the French in Nova Scotia, my son John being prosecuting of it of the King, Whatsoever his Maj'tie doth bestow on me, give him the one halfe; as also the bond of four hundred and forty pounds the halfe of that.

And for my son Henry I leave to him the money that is owing me from William Allen of Prudence Island by order of the Town Council at Portsmouth, and also the moiety of w'ch the town of Mendham ows me w'ch is near forty pounds, and alsothe moiety of w'ch" 500 acres (2 km^{2}) "shall bee sould for lying near Sudbury and for the ten pounds w'ch the General Court hath ordered me shall bee to defray the charges of my burial if I dye suddenly; and as for my bedding with appurt thereunto I give to Sarah Covell if she continue with me till I dye, and for her babe Dorothy I give her ten shillings in money as also her daughter Sara the like.

All my wearing apparel I give to my son Henry and the remainder of my estate, the whole being to my sons John and Henry, I give to my children my daughter Agnes having a double part.

And this I do declare to bee my last will and testimony, revoking all former. As for the debts I do appoint my son Henry to be my executor unto w'ch I have put my hand this Twenty-Fourth day of December in the year 1682.

== Notes ==
Notes

Citations
