= Charles de Saint-Étienne de la Tour =

Governor of Acadia and Seigneur of Port Royal

Charles de Saint-Étienne de La Tour
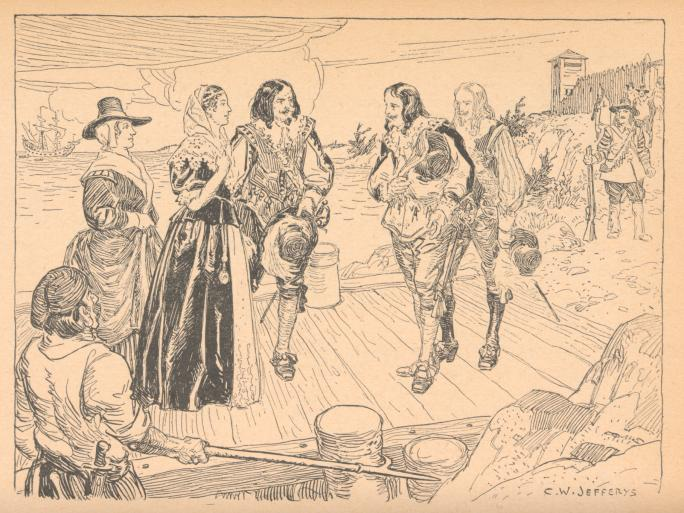
- Born: 1593; France
- Died: 1666 (aged 72–73) Port-Royal (Acadia)
- Allegiance: Kingdom of France
- Service years: 1631-45 and 1653-1657
- Rank: Governor of Acadia
- Spouses: Françoise-Marie Jacquelin and Jeanne Motin

Charles de Saint-Étienne de La Tour (1593–1666) was a Huguenot French colonist and fur trader who served as Governor of Acadia from 1631 to 1642 and again from 1653 to 1657.

== Early life ==
Charles de Saint-Étienne de La Tour was born in France in 1593 to Huguenot Claude de Saint-Étienne de la Tour and his wife Marie Amador de Salazar, a descendant of Georges de La Trémoille, the Grand Chamberlain of France to King Charles VII of France. In 1610, at the age of 17, Charles arrived at Port-Royal in Acadia with his father in an expedition led by Jean de Biencourt de Poutrincourt who had been one of the original settlers in 1604 at Saint Croix Island, Maine before they moved in 1605 to their permanent settlement at Port-Royal. The habitation had been previously abandoned in 1607 by Biencourt de Poutrincourt and others due to financial troubles. The 1610 expedition also included Poutrincourt's 19-year-old son Charles de Biencourt de Saint-Just and a Catholic priest who set about the task of baptizing the local Mi'kmaq people, including their chief Membertou.

In 1613, the habitation at Port-Royal was attacked by Virginia colonists led by Captain Samuel Argall. Several settlers were killed, others taken prisoner and the fort and goods were destroyed. Poutrincourt who had wintered in France to gather supplies returned to Port Royal the next spring. He was forced to return to France with the surviving settlers, and left his interest in the colony to his son. The young Biencourt and Charles de la Tour remained, living amongst the Mi'kmaq and engaging in the fur industry. Charles de Biencourt died in 1623 and left La Tour as his heir, though this was not recognized by the French crown. La Tour took charge of the colony and migrated from Port-Royal to establish himself at Cap de Sable (present-day Port La Tour, Nova Scotia), building a strong post called Fort Lomeron in honor of David Lomeron who was his agent in France. Soon after, La Tour married a woman from the Mi'kmaq tribe and started a family.

With the onset of the Anglo-French War of 1627–29, Charles de La Tour knew he had to strengthen defenses if Acadia were to remain French. He wrote letters to King Louis XIII and Cardinal Richelieu, that were presented by his father Claude, requesting supplies and reinforcements, as well as a proper commission authorizing him to defend the area. Reinforcements were sent in the spring of 1628, however the ships were captured by the English under the command of Sir David Kirke, and the crew, including La Tour's father, were sent as prisoners to England. With the fall of Quebec to the English in 1629, the sole French stronghold left in New France was La Tour's Fort Lomeron. After his capture, Claude de La Tour made an alliance with the English and promised to win over his son, in exchange for being made a baronet of Nova Scotia and a large grant of land. When Charles was pressed by his father to surrender the fort he refused, stating that "he would rather die than betray his King." Upon La Tour's refusal, Claude de La Tour led English troops in an unsuccessful attack on Fort Lomeron.

== Governor of Acadia ==
In 1631, La Tour was formally granted a commission by King Louis XIII naming him lieutenant-general and governor of Acadia. He then relocated to the mouth of the Saint John River in present-day Saint John, New Brunswick where he built a new fort called Fort Sainte-Marie (later named Fort La Tour). The setting was described by historian M.A. MacDonald:

Down this river highway came fleets of canoes, bringing the richest fur harvest in all Acadia to Charles La Tour's storehouses: three thousand moose skins a year, uncounted beaver and otter. On this tongue of land his habitation stood, yellow-roofed, log-palisaded, its cannon commanding the river and bay.

— M.A MacDonald

The following year with the Treaty of Saint-Germain-en-Laye, all the lands that had been seized by the British were returned to France including Acadia. In addition, Cardinal Richelieu sent his cousin, Isaac de Razilly, as the new lieutenant-general of all New France and governor of Acadia, conflicting with La Tour's commission from the prior year. La Tour and Razilly agreed to divide control of Acadia, the latter controlling La Hève, Port-Royal, and the Saint Croix area, while La Tour was given authority over Cap de Sable and the Saint John River, headquartered at Fort Sainte-Marie. Razilly unexpectedly died in 1635, and the amicable relationship the two leaders shared did not extend to his successor, Charles de Menou d'Aulnay.

By 1639, Charles de La Tour's wife had died leaving three daughters, and realizing he needed a male heir to bolster his claim, set about contracting for a new wife. His sights fell on Huguenot Françoise-Marie Jacquelin and a marriage contract was signed on 31 December 1639. The contract authorized Jacquelin kept all her property and anything that she might inherit. She was also entitled to a half share of anything that she or her husband acquired during their marriage, and as a widow she would be entitled to half her husband's estate, with an inheritance fund and she would be the guardian of any children. Upon arriving in Port-Royal in June 1640, the couple married and moved to Fort Sainte-Marie.

== Acadian Civil War ==
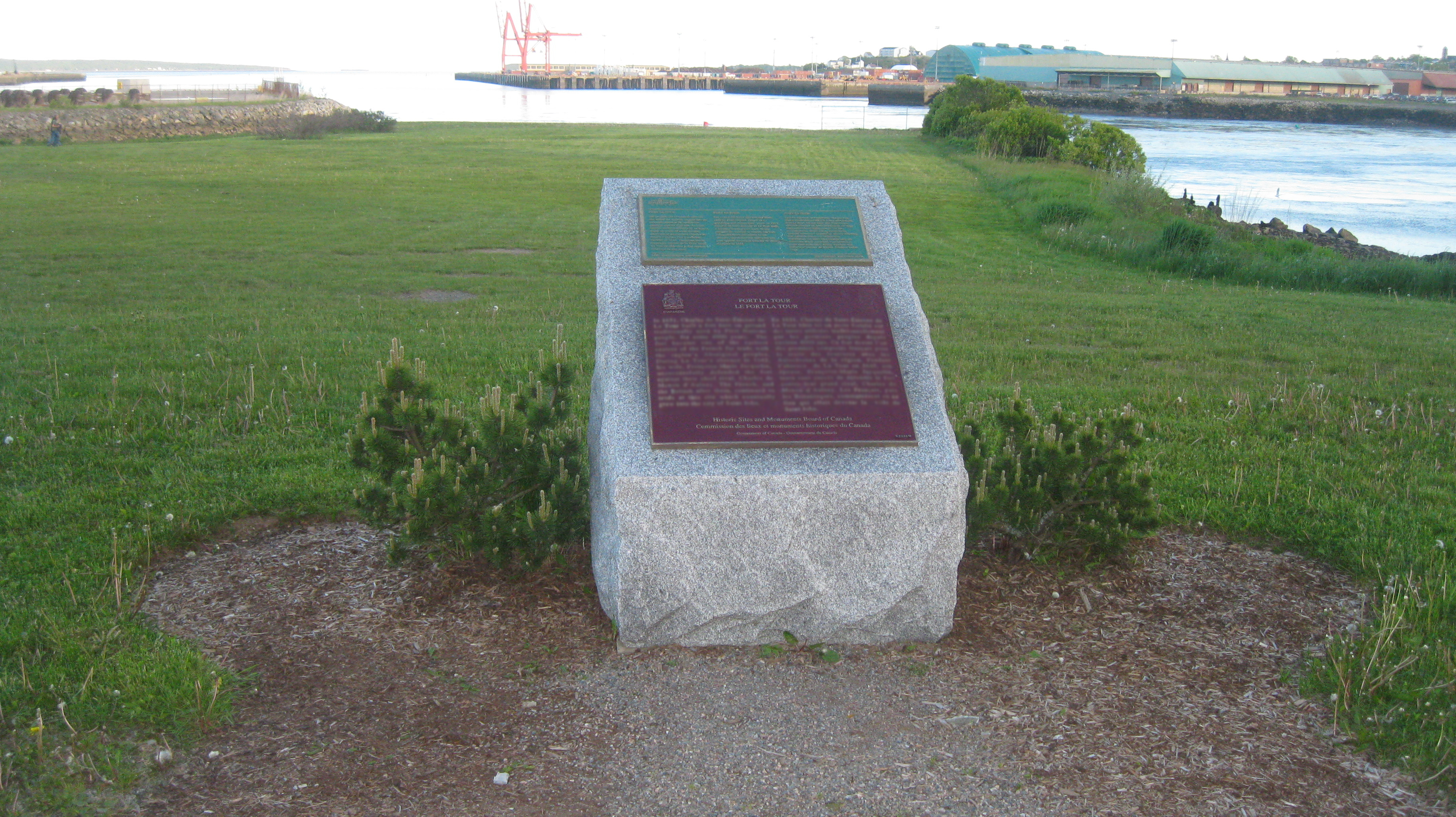
Monument to Fort LaTour, Saint John, New Brunswick

In July 1640, Charles de La Tour and Charles de Menou d'Aulnay began a series of violent and costly confrontations that would last for the next five years. Hostilities continued to escalate and by 1642 d'Aulnay managed to get La Tour charged with treason and disrespect to the French Crown. Knowing he would be imprisoned if he were to return to France, La Tour sent his wife, Françoise-Marie, to advocate on his behalf which she did skillfully. She was allowed to return to Acadia with a warship to help her husband defend himself. In the Spring of 1643, La Tour led a party of English mercenaries against the Acadian colony at Port-Royal. His 270 Puritan and Huguenot troops killed three, burned a mill, slaughtered cattle and seized 18,000 livres of furs.

In 1645, while La Tour was in Boston seeking reinforcements and drumming up more support for his cause, d'Aulnay retaliated by seizing all of La Tour's possessions and outposts, especially Fort La Tour at Saint John and Cap de Sable. In the Battle of Saint John, La Tour's wife defended the fort for three days. On the fourth day despite losing 33 men, d'Aulnay was able to breach the fort, and La Tour's men were sent to the gallows, forcing Françoise-Marie to watch with a rope around her own neck. Three weeks later she died at age 23 while a prisoner as documented by Nicolas Denys' letters and journals of the drama. Upon learning of his wife's death, and the loss of all his possessions, La Tour sought refuge at the Chateau Saint-Louis in Quebec City where he was welcomed by Governor Charles Jacques Huault de Montmagny, and d'Aulnay became the sole governor of Acadia.

== Later years and death ==
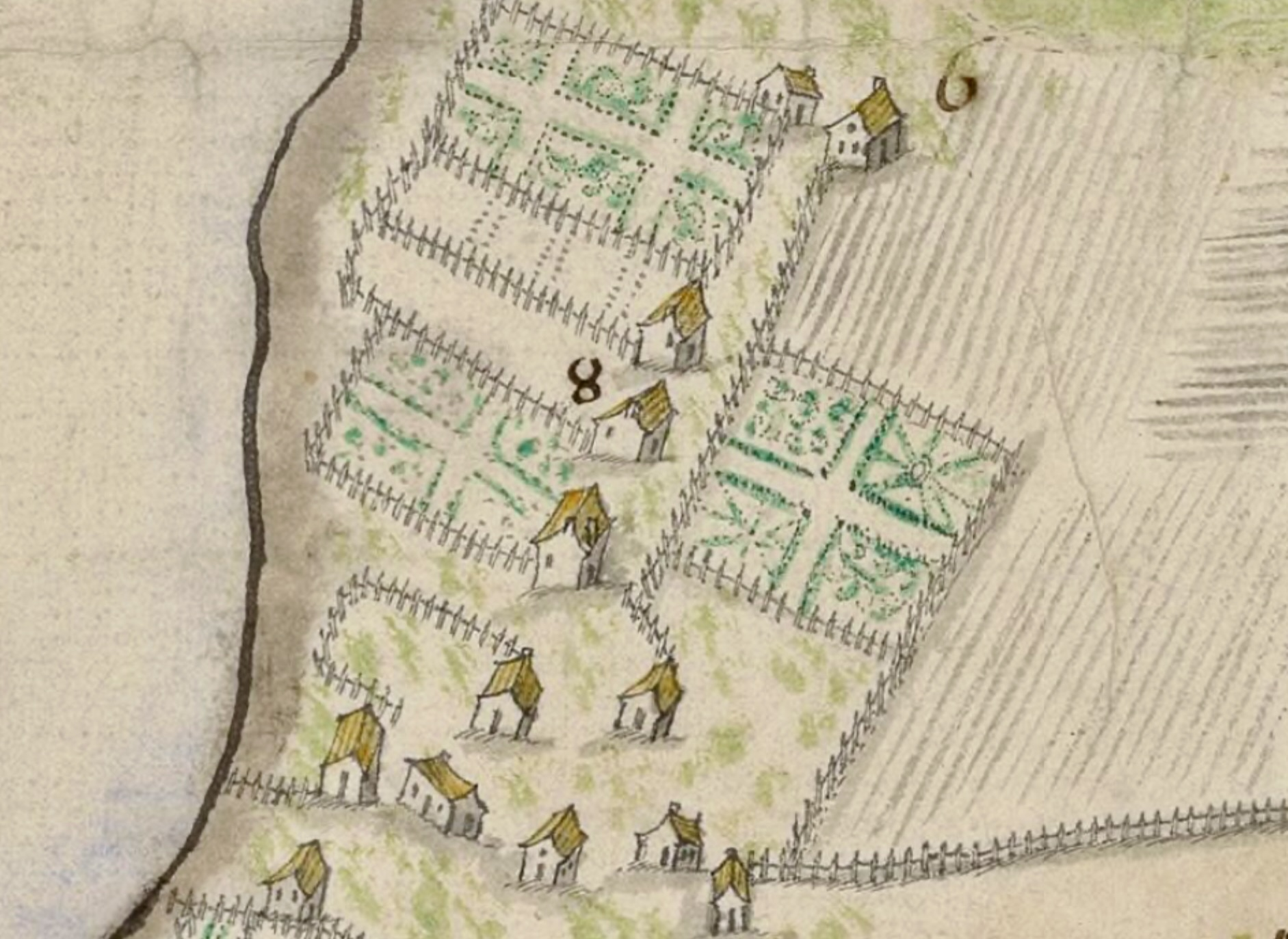
The only confirmed image of the seigneurial manor belonging to Marie de Saint-Étienne de La Tour, Charles de la Tour's eldest daughter with Jeanne Motin, and her husband Alexandre Le Borgne. Marked as number "8" on a close-up of a 1686 Port Royal map.

During the next four years while in exile in Quebec, Charles de La Tour continued in the fur trade, assisted the Jesuits in their missionary efforts, and occasionally fought with the Hurons against the Iroquois. In 1650, d'Aulnay died when his canoe capsized. La Tour promptly returned to France to plead his case and was successfully rehabilitated in the royal favor, as well as having his property and his commission as governor being restored. He returned to Acadia in 1653, along with several new colonist families including his friend Philippe Mius d'Entremont, to whom he awarded one of the few fiefs to constitute territory in North America. In an effort to bring an end to the rivalry between the La Tour and d'Aulnay faction, Charles de La Tour married a third time to Jeanne Motin, the widow of his former enemy on 24 February 1653.

In 1654, an English expedition under the command of Major General Robert Sedgwick captured the forts of Saint John, Port Royal, and the settlement of Penobscot adding Acadia to the British dominions. La Tour was taken prisoner to England, and it was not until 1656 that he was granted an audience with Oliver Cromwell to request the return of his property. Recognized as a baronet of Nova Scotia, as his father's heir, Cromwell granted his request on the condition that he accept English allegiance and pay both the amount he owed Boston merchants and the cost of the English garrison maintained at Saint John. In an effort to raise funds to cover these funds, he took on William Crowne and Colonel William Temple as joint proprietors of Acadia. Soon afterwards he sold his rights to his two partners, retaining only a small percentage of the profit. Early historians presume La Tour retired to Cap de Sable (present-day Port La Tour, Nova Scotia), with his wife, and died there in 1666. However, more recent and systematic evidence shows that he most likely lived at Port Royal after 1657 and resided there until his death.

== Marriage and issue ==
Charles de Saint-Étienne de La Tour was married three times.

Name	Birth	Death	Notes
By Unnamed Mi'kmaq wife (married approximately 1625)
Jeanne de Saint-Étienne de La Tour	1626	1686	Married Martin d'Aprendestiguy de Martignon in 1655 and had issue
Antoinette de Saint-Étienne de La Tour			Became a nun
Unnamed de Saint-Étienne de La Tour			Became a nun
By Françoise-Marie Jacquelin (married June 1640 until her death in 1645)
Charles de Saint-Étienne de La Tour	1645		Sent back to France by d'Aulnay and adopted by Françoise-Marie's sister Gabrielle
By Jeanne Motin (married February 1653 until La Tour's death in 1666)
Marie de Saint-Étienne de La Tour	1654	28 May 1739	Married Alexandre Le Borgne in 1675 and had issue
Jacques de Saint-Étienne de La Tour	1655	1697	Married Anne Melanson in 1685 and had issue including Agathe de Saint Etienne de La Tour
Marguerite de Saint-Étienne de La Tour	1658	15 July 1748	Married Abraham Mius d'Entremont in 1685 and had issue
Anne de Saint-Étienne de La Tour	1661	15 September 1738	Married Jacques Mius d'Entremont, 2nd Baron of Pobomcoup in 1678 and had issue
Charles de Saint-Étienne de La Tour	1663	11 August 1731	Married Jeanne Angélique Loreau in 1699 and had issue

== Ancestry ==
Ancestors of Charles de Saint-Étienne de la Tour

4. Guyon Turgis Turgis De St Etienne Saint-Etienne De La Tour (1542 - 1609)
2.TURGIS says SAINT-ÉTIENNE, Claude
5. CONDOT, Marie
1. Charles de Saint-Étienne de la Tour
12. Salazar, F
6. SALAZAR (de), Hector
13. Marie Rouvroy de Saint-Simon
3. SALAZAR (of), Marie Amador
14. COURCELLES of Pierre
7. COURCELLES (de), Antoinette
15.

== Legacy ==
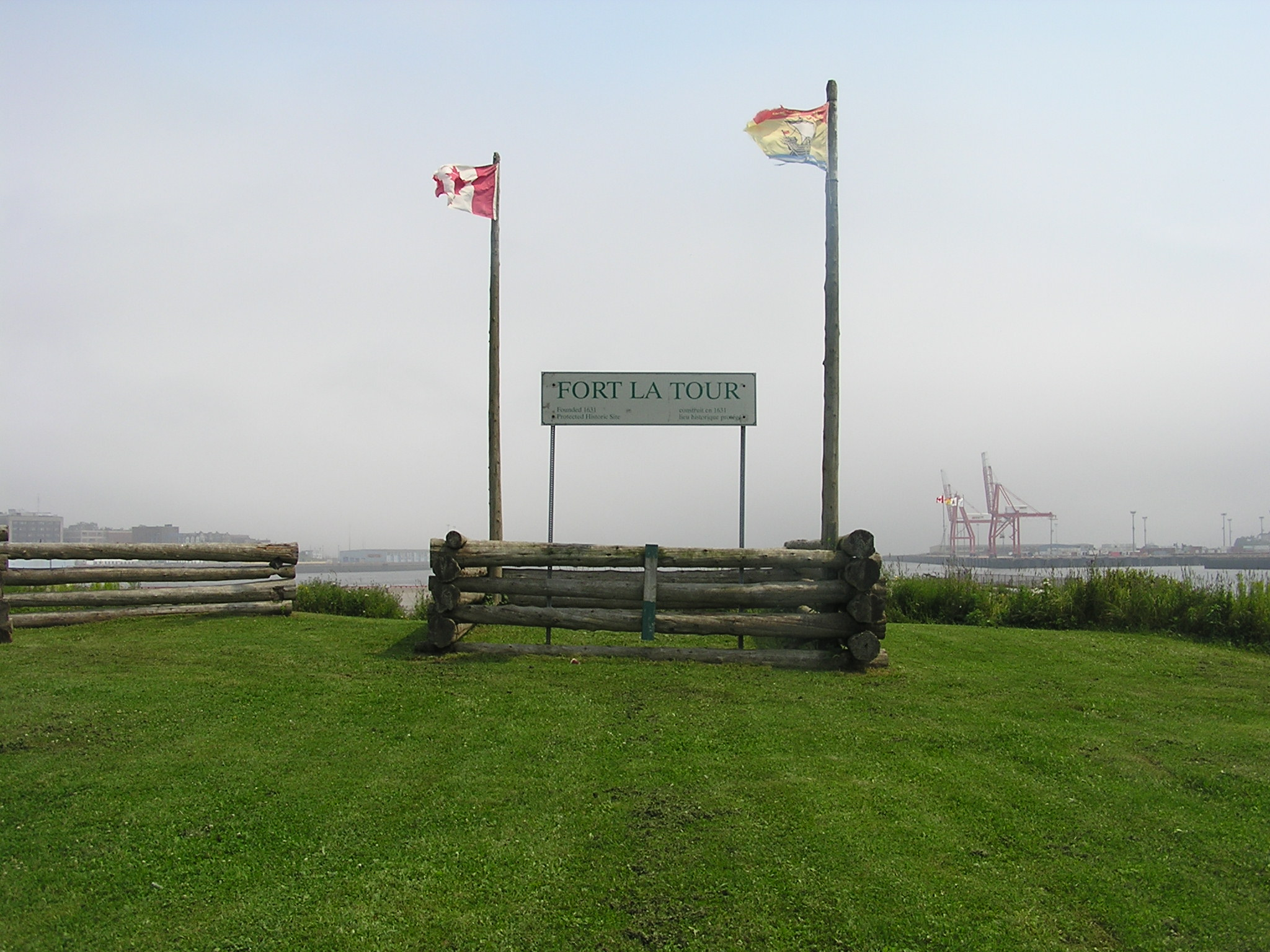
Fort La Tour

The communities of Port La Tour, Nova Scotia and Upper Port La Tour, Nova Scotia are named after Charles La Tour.

== See also ==
English Invasion of Acadia (1654)

== Notes and references ==
Preceded by Charles de Biencourt de Saint-Just (1615-1623)	Governor of Acadia; 1631-1642 along with Isaac de Razilly (1632-1635) and Charles de Menou d'Aulnay (1638-1650)	Succeeded by Charles de Menou d'Aulnay (1638-1650)
Preceded by Charles de Menou d'Aulnay (1638-1650)	Governor of Acadia; 1653-1657	Succeeded by Emmanuel Le Borgne 1653-1657)
