= John Bradstreet =

Canadian politician

Major-General John Bradstreet
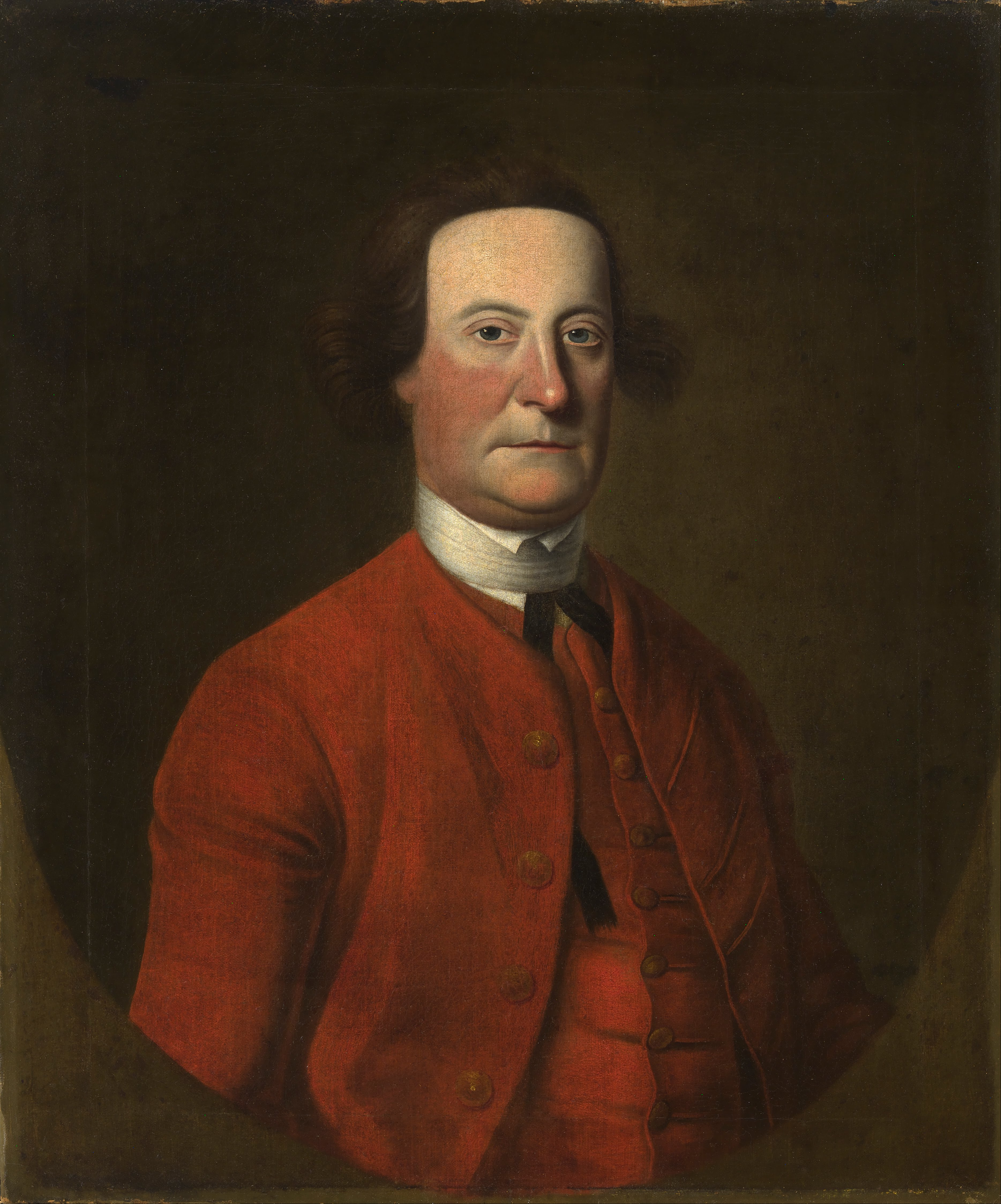
- Portrait by Thomas McIlworth, c. 1764
- Born: 21 December 1714; Annapolis Royal, Nova Scotia
- Died: 25 September 1774 (aged 59); New York City, British America
- Military career
- Allegiance: Great Britain
- Branch: British Army
- Service years: 1735–1774
- Rank: Major general
- Commands: Expeditionary force to Fort Frontenac
- Conflicts: King George's War; French and Indian War; Battle of Fort Oswego; Battle of Carillon; Battle of Fort Frontenac; Pontiac's War

Viceregal styles of John Bradstreet
- Reference style: His Excellency
- Spoken style: Your Excellency

Major-General John Bradstreet (born Jean-Baptiste Bradstreet; 21 December 1714 – 25 September 1774) was a British Army officer and colonial administrator who served in King George's War, the French and Indian War and Pontiac's War. He was born in Annapolis Royal, Nova Scotia, to a British army lieutenant and an Acadian mother. He also served as the Commodore-Governor for Newfoundland.

== Life ==
Jean-Baptiste Bradstreet was the son of Agathe de Saint Etienne de La Tour and her first husband, Edward Bradstreet. It is unknown whether he was related to Puritan Simon Bradstreet. Bradstreet died in New York City on 25 September 1774. He had married (to the widow of a cousin who shared his name), and had two children.

== Military service ==
Through his Acadian mother's influence he was accepted into the regular British army in 1735. Bradstreet's early military service consisted of garrison duty in Nova Scotia with the 40th Regiment of Foot, during which time he took advantage of his Acadian heritage and engaged in trade with the French at Louisbourg. As a young officer he was stationed at Canso, during King George's War he was captured in the French raid on Canso, however he was released within a year. During his internment Bradstreet developed plans for the capture of Louisbourg, although it is not clear whether these plans were ever implemented and to his dismay he was not given command of the expedition. However Bradstreet accepted a commission as lieutenant-colonel of the 1st Massachusetts Regiment and contributed to the final victory at Louisbourg, which fell after a siege in 1745.

=== French and Indian War ===
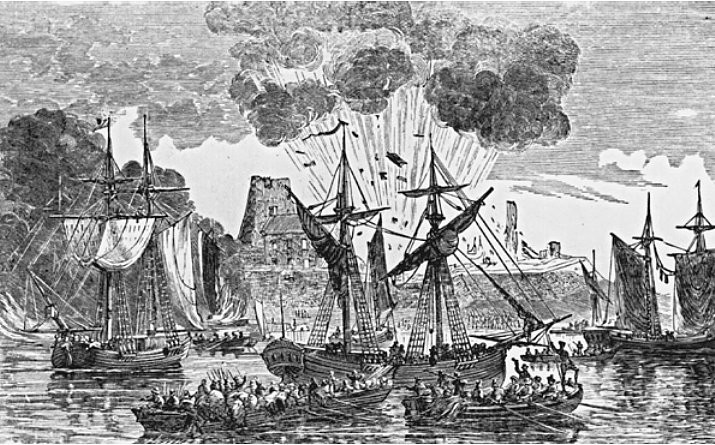
Bradstreet's raid on Frontenac.

In 1755, Bradstreet, then a captain, was appointed as Governor William Shirley's adjutant general. In 1756 he led a relief column to Fort Oswego with supplies. Upon his return he was attacked a combined French-Indian force. He survived but his warnings to Governor Shirley and Lord Loudon of the weak condition of Fort Oswego were largely ignored in midst of their ongoing power struggle. The French captured and burned Oswego later the same year. In the spring of 1757 he assembled supplies and transports at Boston for Loudoun's abortive expedition against Louisbourg.

At Halifax in August, he was among those who felt that the attack should not be postponed. On 27 December 1757 he was appointed Lt. Colonel and in 1758 he participated in the attack on Fort Carillon, where he led the advance guard following the death of General George Howe, 3rd Viscount Howe. The Battle ended in disaster and Bradstreet attempted to organize some sort of retreat, which had turned into a chaotic rout. After the failed attempt to capture Ticonderoga, Bradstreet immediately proposed his idea to attack Fort Frontenac, the key French supply base on Lake Ontario.

Bradstreet's proposal met with approval from British planners and he was given a force of approximately 3,000 men to carry out the operation. Bradstreet reached Lake Ontario on 21 August and four days later was within sight of the fort, which surrendered on the 27th. After sacking and burning the fort, Bradstreet's force retreated to British territory. With this attack the French had (at least temporarily) their supply line in the Great Lakes cut. Under the new British commander in North America, Jeffery Amherst, Bradstreet served as deputy quartermaster general in Albany, a lucrative position which he held until the end of the war.

=== Pontiac's War ===
Shortly after the French and Indian War, Bradstreet was appointed colonel in 1764 and was ordered to lead a force of 1,400 men to reinforce Fort Detroit in response to the outbreak of Pontiac's War. His superiors considered Bradstreet to have mismanaged his final campaign; exceeding his orders by attempting to negotiate independent peace treaties and failing to act aggressively enough against Pontiac's forces. This left his military reputation badly tarnished in later years, although he was still promoted to the rank of major general on 25 May 1772.

== Bateau and Transport Service ==
Bradstreet is often remembered today for his work organizing and leading a corps of armed boatmen and teamsters in the British service, tasked with moving supplies and troops along the inland waterways of upstate New York and the Great Lakes. A substantial logistical feat, the force was developed from 1756 and grew to the strength of several thousand men, organized into dozens of companies, using hundreds of bateaux and whaleboats to transport the thousands of tons of supplies and equipment necessary for Britain to wage war in the colonial Northwest by supplying the army's far-flung outposts. Also a combat force, the 'Battoe Men', as they were sometimes called, took part in combat operations, most famously Bradstreet's assault on Fort Frontenac/Carillon in 1758.

== See also ==
- Military history of Nova Scotia
