= Hector d'Andigné de Grandfontaine =

Governor of Acadia, French naval officer

Chevalier Hector d'Andigné de Grandfontaine

Governor of Acadia
- In office 1670–1673
- Preceded by: Thomas Temple
- Succeeded by: Jacques de Chambly

Personal details
- Born: 17 May 1627 Ruillé-Froid-Fonds, Maine, France
- Died: 6 July 1696 Brest, France
- Awards: Order of Saint Louis

Military service
- Allegiance: Kingdom of France
- Branch/service: French Navy
- Rank: Captain
- Battles/wars: Campaign against the Mohawk (1666), Expedition to Cayenne (1676), Action of March 1677

Hector d'Andigné de Grandfontaine (baptized 17 May 1627; died 6 July 1696) was a French naval officer who served as the governor of Acadia from 1670 to 1673.

Grandfontaine was baptised in France and became a Knight of Malta. He was captain of a company in Quebec in 1665 and participated in a military campaign against the Mohawk people. He was appointed governor of Acadia in 1670 after the region was returned to French governance by the British. He tried to bolster French control of the region by resolving the concerns of the citizens of the colony and encouraging French loyalty. Upon his return to France he was appointed as a naval officer. He received the Order of Saint Louis and died on 6 July 1696.

== Early life and family ==
Grandfontaine was baptised in Ruillé-Froid-Fonds, Mayenne. His father was named Hector and his mother was named Anne. His grandfather, Gaston d’Andigné, received the Grandfontaine property and it was added to the family name. Hector was the youngest of four boys.

Grandfontaine was a Knight of Malta.

== Quebec ==
Grandfontaine arrived in Quebec in 1665 to captain a company of the Carignan-Salières Regiment. He supervised the construction of a road between Fort Saint-Louis and Fort Sainte Thérèse, and participated in a campaign against the Mohawk people, in which Grandfontaine signed the report indicating the French annexation of the Mohawk territory. He returned to France shortly afterward.

Grandfontaine offered to lead a company in order to obtain land in Quebec, but was sent to Acadia instead. He became governor of Acadia in 1670 as the first French governor after the British occupation of the region from 1654 to 1670. He arrived in North America the following year and went to Boston to receive the letters of restitution of Acadia from the previous British governor, Thomas Temple. Grandfontaine established Acadia's capital at Fort Pentagouet, per orders from his intendent, Jean Talon, in order to be close to the animals that produced fur pelts. Shortly after his arrival he organised a census of the colony, which counted around 500 people.

As governor, Grandfontaine was tasked to reestablish order in the region after a dispute among the heirs of previous governors. He replaced the Port-Royal inhabitants' council with giving sole authority to Le Borgne de Bélisle, but was forced to remove Bélisle when the inhabitants expressed disapproval over the new governing structure. The population was also advocating for independence after being separated from France for several years. He brought supplies to the colony and removed a controversial seigneur, asking the population to wait until a government official could come to their towns to judge their concerns. He also encouraged French immigrants to come to the region, paying their travel costs.

The Treaty of Breda did not establish the boundaries of Acadia, so Grandfontaine established the boundary at the St. George River and tried to convince the newly acquired English forts to become loyal to France.

== Navy career and death ==
Grandfontaine was replaced as governor by Jacques de Chambly in 1673 and Grandfontaine returned to France. He demanded reimbursement of 13,000 livres, and although it was refused he was appointed to a navy post instead. He served as a lieutenant-commander, then as a captain within the navy.

He was aboard the Glorieux during an expedition to capture Cayenne for the French empire and was the person to enter the town, subsequently becoming wounded in the arm. He broke his arm during the Action of March 1677 and could not use it for the rest of his life. He retired to Brest, France, and received the Order of Saint Louis by 1693. He died on 6 July 1696 in Brest.
