= Thomas Temple =

Governor of Nova Scotia

Sir Thomas Temple, 1st Baronet (January 1613/14 at Stowe, Buckinghamshire, England – 27 March 1674 at Ealing, Middlesex) was an English proprietor and governor of Acadia/Nova Scotia (1657–70). In 1662, he was created a Baronet of Nova Scotia by Charles II.

== Family ==
Coat of Arms of Thomas Temple

He was the second son of Sir John Temple of Stanton Bury and his first wife Dorothy, daughter of Edmund Lee, and a grandson of Sir Thomas Temple, 1st Baronet, of Stowe. Sir Thomas Temple was the great nephew of Lord Saye and Sele. Temple's cousins, Nathaniel Fiennes and John Fiennes were prominent supporter of parliament in the Civil War and members of Oliver Cromwell's Council of State. Both were appointed to Cromwell's House of Lords.

== Temple in North America ==
In the year 1656, Colonel Temple and Colonel William Crowne became joint proprietors of Nova Scotia, by buying Charles de Saint-Étienne de la Tour's patent as baronet of Nova Scotia. By this purchase, Crowne and Temple agreed to pay la Tour's debt of £3,379 to the widow of Maj.-Gen. Edward Gibbons of Boston, and Temple assumed the cost of the English that which had earlier captured the fort on the Saint John River. According to his statement of losses in about 1668, Crown supplied the money and security for the purchases.

Temple, Crowne, Crowne's son John Crowne, and a group of settlers came to America in 1657. Crowne's name first appears in the records of Suffolk County, Massachusetts, in September 1657 on an agreement between Temple and Crowne to divide Acadia, Temple taking the eastern part and Crowne the western, including the fort of Pentagouet (now Castine, Maine). The articles of agreement were not signed until 15 Feb. 1657/58 when Governor John Endecott and John Crowne witnessed them. Each party gave a bond of £20,000.

Crowne took possession of his part of Acadia and built a trading post on the Penobscot River at a place called "Negu", or "Negu alias Cadascat". John Crown attended Harvard for the next three years. On 1 November 1658, Crowne leased the whole territory to Captain George Corwin and Ensign Joshua Scottee, and in 1659 to Temple for four years. In each case the consideration was £110 per year. At this time Crowne was living in Boston, and was made a freeman of Boston on 30 May 1660.

The claim of Temple and Crowne to the grant of Nova Scotia by Cromwell was threatened at the Restoration by both French and English claims. Thomas Elliott, one of the grooms of the bedchamber to Charles, petitioned his master for a grant of the province. Sir Lewis Kirke and associates and the heirs of Sir William Alexander also petitioned for it. In 1661 the French ambassador claimed it for France. That same year Crowne, accompanied by his son, went to England with a petition, signed by the three original grantees (Crowne, Temple, and la Tour) which he submitted on 1 March. On 22 June 1661 he submitted a statement on the manner in which he and Temple became proprietors. While in England, Crowne also pleaded the cause of the colonists before the council and lord chamberlain on 4 December 1661. Temple arrived in England in February 1662 and prepared a statement in answer to the French ambassador's claim, which gained him and his heirs a grant of Acadia and Nova Scotia and the governorship for life.

Soon after the starting of the uncharted Massachusetts Bay Colony mint, Charles II of England, with much anger questioned Temple, who was the first agent officially dispatched by the General Court to London. King Charles asked why this American Colony presumed to invade His Majesty's rights by coining money. Then ensued a long discussion between the king and Temple on the pine tree shilling minted by John Hull in the "Hull Mint".

The first trading post at present-day Jemseg, New Brunswick, was built near the mouth of the Jemseg River in 1659 by Temple. This was a fortified post convenient for trade with the Maliseet Indians.

Temple had his headquarters at Penobscot (present day Castine, Maine), keeping garrisons at Port Royal and at Saint John. It was during this time that the la Tour fort at the mouth of the Saint John River was abandoned in favour of a new fort at Jemseg, 50 miles (80 km) or so up the river. At Jemseg, occupiers were put out of the way of seagoing pirates. Jemseg was also a better place to trade with the descending river Indians.

With the Treaty of Breda in 1667, in North America, Acadia was returned to France, without specifying what territories were actually involved on the ground. Thomas Temple, the proprietor, residing in Boston, had been given a charter by Cromwell, which was ignored in the treaty, and the actual handing off was delayed at the site until 1670.

Temple had governed Acadia for nine years, from the time he bought his rights from la Tour in 1656, until he was ordered by the British crown to hand over his rights to the French by the Treaty of Breda.

From 1667 to 1670 Temple lived in Boston and continued to seek recompense from the king for his expenses and losses in Nova Scotia.

He prospered after settling in Boston. He gained property there while still living in Nova Scotia, being very active in commerce, especially real estate. He was prominent among those who attempted to develop some of the Boston Harbor Islands, and he had leased Deer Island.

Temple moved to London before his death. He was buried at Ealing, Middlesex. His will left the bulk of his estate to his nephew, John Nelson of Boston.

== Notes ==
Baronetage of Nova Scotia
New creation	Baronet; 1662–1674	Extinct
