= Charles de Biencourt de Saint-Just =

Canadian politician

Baron Charles de Biencourt de Saint-Just (1591 or 1592, Champagne, France – 1623 or 1624, Port-Royal of what was then Acadia, New France). was a member of the French nobility and a military officer. He is best known as the successor to his father, Jean de Biencourt de Poutrincourt et de Saint-Just as commander of the settlement at Port-Royal and the King's Governor of Acadia from his father's death in 1615 until his own death. Because of his father's frequent trips to France, he had been previously acting in that capacity.

Poutrincourt oversaw Acadia under the authority of Pierre Dugua, Sieur de Mons until 1607 when he was notified that the King had rescinded de Mons' monopoly and that the Crown's contribution to the costs to maintain Port-Royal would not be continued.

Following the murder of King Henry IV and the ascension to the French throne by Louis XIII, under Marie de' Medici's regency, Biencourt and his father were authorized to return to Acadia. Their mandate required them to take along a Roman Catholic priest who would be responsible for the colony's welfare and for missionary work to convert the native peoples.

In 1611, Biencourt returned to France with a shipload of furs during which time the Crown appointed him Vice-Admiral of Acadia. Biencourt arranged financing for his colonial business ventures from two Huguenot businessmen from Dieppe but that was withdrawn when he was compelled by the King to take two Jesuit priests with him to Acadia to expand the Roman Catholic missionary work among the natives. New financing was arranged with the Jesuit Society becoming the partners of Jean de Poutrincourt and Thomas Robin de Coulogne, sharing in the profits from their colonial trading activities.

== Conflicts with the Jesuits ==
Biencourt proved highly successful in his fur-trading ventures until 1618 when the industry went into decline. Port-Royal was gradually falling apart as a result of neglect and the lack of new immigrant settlers and it is thought that in the final few years before his death, Biencourt lived primarily with the natives.
