= Guillaume Couture =

French missionary (c. 1617–1701)

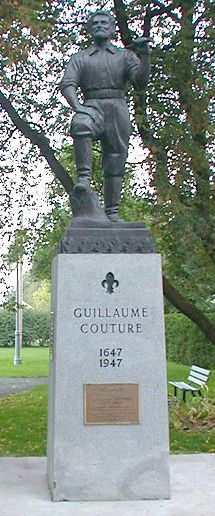
Monument to Guillaume Couture in Levis

Guillaume Couture (January 14, 1618 – April 4, 1701) was a citizen of New France. During his life he was a lay missionary with the Jesuits, a survivor of torture, a member of a Haudenosaunee (Iroquois) council, a translator, a diplomat, a militia captain, and a lay leader among the colonists of the Pointe-Lévy (now named Lévis city) in the Seigneury of Lauzon, a district of New France located on the South Side of Quebec City.

== Early life and recruitment by the Jesuits ==
Couture was born in 1618 in Rouen, Normandy, and baptized in the church Saint-Godard in Rouen, the son of Guillaume Couture and Madeleine Mallet. His father, Guillaume was a carpenter in the St-Godard district and young Guillaume was trained in the same occupation. However, by 1640 he was recruited by Jesuits to be a donné in New France to convert Natives to Roman Catholicism.

=== Work with Isaac Jogues ===
Couture arrived in New France in 1640. In the summer of 1641, he went to work among the Wendat (Huron). The following spring Couture returned to Quebec in company with the Jesuit leader Isaac Jogues. During this period, Couture learned several major Native languages, which increased his stature, for he could now work as a translator for the Jesuits. Couture also learned much about native culture and ways during this period. He was also a master carpenter, "a deadly marksman with the musket and a sincerely pious man."

=== Tortured by the Haudenosaunee ===
In August 1642, Couture, Jogues, lay missionary, René Goupil, and several Wendat converts set out on their return to the Huron missions. A Haudenosaunee war party ambushed the group. Right before the attack, Couture saw the Wendat, who realized what was about to happen, take off into the woods; Couture followed them as Jogues and Goupil were captured. When Couture realized that he had become separated from his companions he went back to search for them.

Couture then encountered five Haudenosaunee. One of them fired a gun at Couture, but missed. Couture returned fire, killing the warrior instantly. The other four Haudenosaunee fell upon Couture and beat him with their war clubs. They also ran a spear through one of his hands. Later on, Couture, Jogues, and Goupil were subjected to even more torture. The Haudenosaunee tore out Couture's fingernails, and bit the ends. Then the three men were stripped and forced to walk through a gauntlet, the Haudenosaunee beating the three men with sticks. After arriving at an Haudenosaunee village, a Haudenosaunee leader took out a dull knife and began to cut off Couture's right middle finger. When this failed to work, the chief simply pulled the finger out of its socket. At this point, Couture was sent deep into Haudenosaunee Country (present day upstate New York in Auriesville) where he was given to the family of the man he had killed to be their slave.

== Diplomacy and release ==
In 1645, Charles de Montmagny, the governor of New France, decided it was time to end the war with the Haudenosaunee. He released several Haudenosaunee prisoners and sent them into Haudenosaunee country to negotiate a peace settlement. The Haudenosaunee in turn released Couture, and asked him to act on their behalf, which Couture agreed to do. Couture arrived at Trois-Rivières and, along with two Haudenosaunee leaders, was able to put an end (for the time) the war between the Five Nations of the Haudenosaunee and the French.

Instead of settling down after such an ordeal, Couture decided to go straight back to Wendat country. In 1646 he was reported as working in the Huron missions with Father Pijart. He only did this for only two years between 1645 and 1647.

== First settler of Pointe-Lévy in the Seigneury of Lauzon ==
On May 15, 1647, he became the first settler of the Seigneury of Lauzon at Pointe-Lévy (located across the Saint Lawrence River from Quebec City) which will become the city of Lévis in 1861. However, he was not a seigneur because the Seigneury of Lauzon was the property of Jean de Lauzon, the Governor of New France between 1651 and 1657. In 1649, the Jesuit leaders in New France voted unanimously to release Couture from his vows and to allow him to get married. The woman whom Couture chose to be his bride was Anne Émard or Aymard, who was from St-André-de-Niort, in Poitou region of France. The couple would have ten children during their years of marriage.

== Last mission and last expedition in New France ==
During the 1650s and 1660s, Couture acted as a diplomat, going to New Netherland (present-day New York) to negotiate trade and to settle boundary disputes between the two colonies.

In 1663, Couture was recruited by French Governor Pierre Dubois Davaugour for a mission in the North of New France. The main mission was to find the North Sea. However, Couture found the Mistassini Lake and he goes to the Rupert River. He was accompanied by Pierre Duquet and Jean Langlois and many Amerindians. This shipment consisted of 44 boats. No doubt Couture's skills with native languages came into good use. The party worked among the Papinachois, who lived in present-day northeastern Quebec.

== The administrator and Captain of the Militia of Pointe-Lévy ==
Sometime around 1666, with war with the Haudenosaunee and the English looming, Couture, now living full-time in Pointe-Lévy (Lévis) since 1647. Couture was the main administrator and had been named Captain of the Militia for the area he lived in. This was a major honour in New France, going only to those who had proved themselves, something Couture had done again and again. In 1690, when Admiral William Phips invaded Quebec City Area with a force of New England colonists, Couture was able to prevent the English from attacking Pointe-Lévy at the age of 72.

By this point, Couture was also the Chief Magistrate of the Pointe-Lévy (today Lévis) district. Among his jobs were to run the censuses, enforce government edicts, and run the local assemblies that met from time to time. Couture was also in charge of local court cases, being both judge and jury. On some occasions, Couture was invited to sit on the Sovereign Council, which ran New France for Louis XIV. The fact that the status-obsessed French government offered Couture a part-time seat on the council shows how highly the leaders of New France viewed him.

== Marriage and children ==
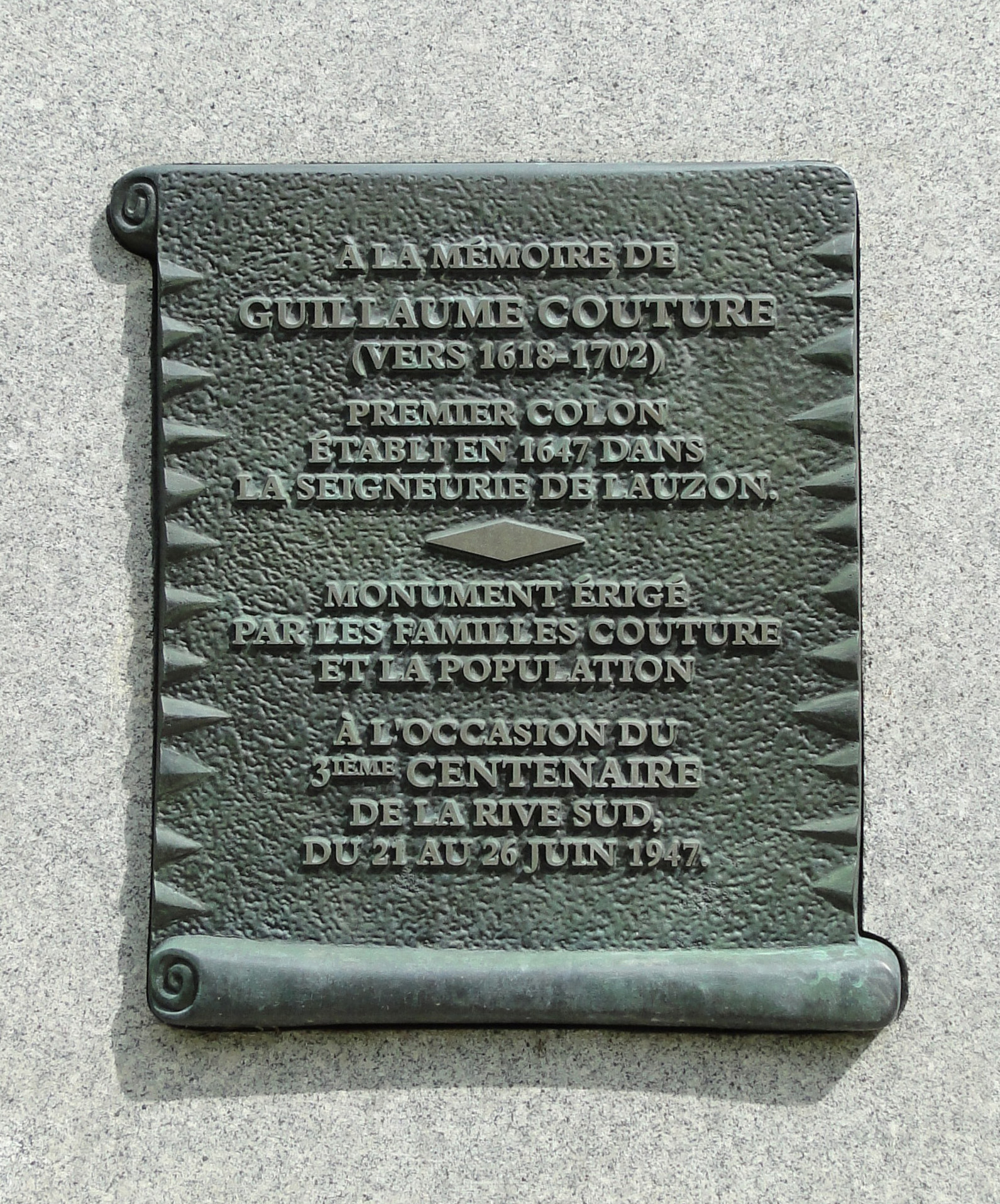
Plaque of Guillaume Couture in Lévis.

Guillaume married Anne Émard (or Aymard) on November 16, 1649, in Quebec City, Quebec, Canada. Together they had the following children:

- Jean Baptiste (6 Nov 1650-22 Aug 1698)
- Anne (22 Jan 1652-26 Nov 1684)
- Louis (29 Aug 1654-?)
- Marguerite (29 Feb 1656-28 Mar 1690)
- Marie (18 Jun 1658-22 Jul 1702)
- Charles (29 Nov 1659-9 Sep 1709)
- Guillaume (11 Oct 1662-15 Dec 1738)
- Louise (19 Mar 1665-22 Dec 1751)
- Eustache François (24 Mar 1667-16 May 1733)
- Joseph Auger (27 Jul 1670-6 May 1733)

== Death ==
On November 17, 1700, Couture's wife, Anne Émard, died. In the spring of 1701, Couture was 83 years old and ill, possibly from smallpox. He was moved to the Hôtel-Dieu de Québec, where he died on April 4, 1701. The location of his tomb is unknown, as is the location of the tomb of Samuel de Champlain, founder of Quebec City. There is a park dedicated to Couture in Lévis.
