= Jean de Biencourt de Poutrincourt et de Saint-Just =

Governor of Acadia and Seigneur of Port Royal

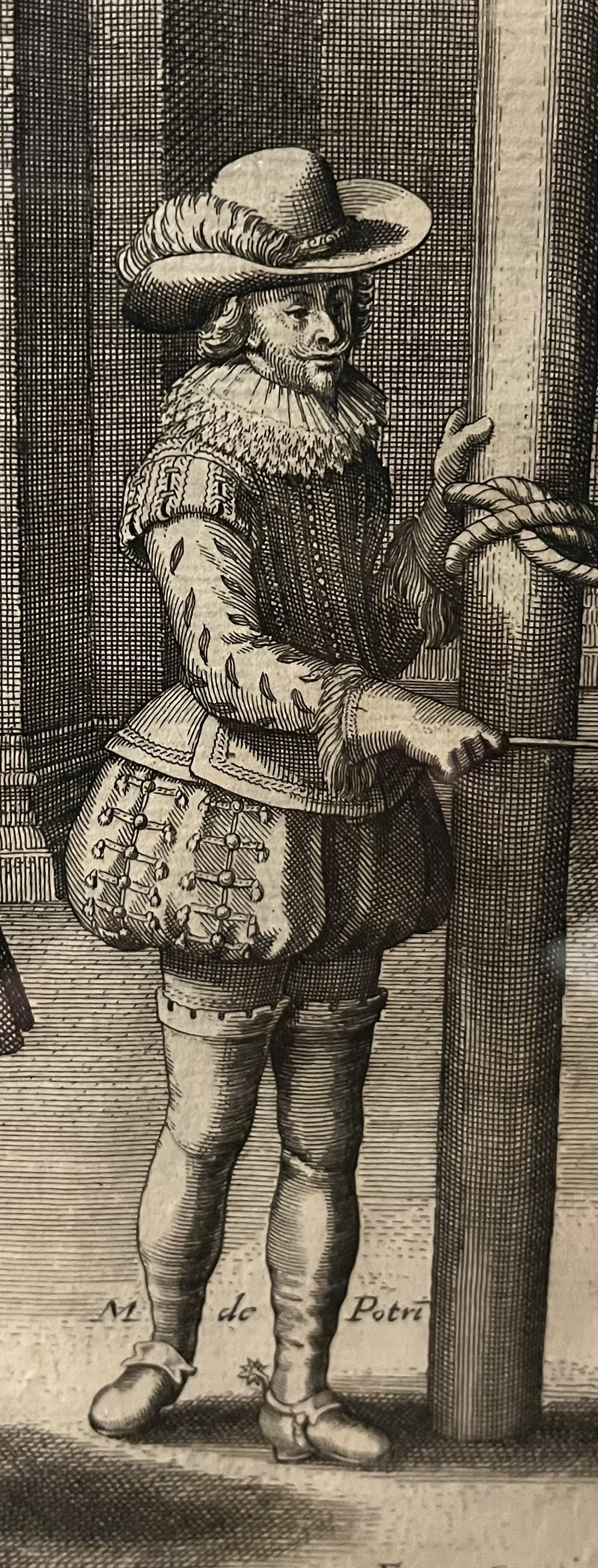
Jean de Poutrincourt

Jean de Biencourt de Poutrincourt et de Saint-Just (Jean Biencourt, Baron of Poutrincourt and Saint-Just) (1557–1615) was a member of the French nobility best remembered as a commander of the French colonial empire, one of those responsible for establishing the most successful among early attempts to establish a permanent settlement in the North American territory that became known as Acadia, a region of New France.

== Life ==
Jean de Poutrincourt was born in 1547, the third son of Florimond de Biencourt and Jeanne de Salazar. In 1565 he was given the seigneury of Marsilly-sur-Seine. In 1590 Poutrincourt married Claude Pajot; they had two sons and six daughters.

He made his first voyage to the New World in 1604 as a senior member of the expedition led by Pierre Dugua de Mons that established a colony, first on Saint Croix Island but which moved after one winter to build a new settlement in 1605 at Port-Royal. Because of political opposition at home, de Mons decided to remain in France and appointed Poutrincourt governor of Port Royal in 1606. In addition to the title, de Mons granted him ownership of the land in and around the colony, along with fur-trading privileges and fishing rights. These privileges and rights were confirmed by Henri IV, King of France on February 25, 1606. The inclusion of the fur-trading rights was particularly important to Poutrincourt's fortunes in the early years of the colony. After one successful winter, Port Royal was abandoned in 1607 when support from France was cut off.

Poutrincourt again returned to Acadia in 1610, along with his son Charles de Biencourt de Saint-Just, Claude de Saint-Étienne de la Tour and his son Charles de Saint-Étienne de la Tour.

The son of François Gravé Du Pont abandoned the ship left to his care and went to live among the indigenous tribes, adopting their customs for himself. He was arrested by Poutrincourt in 1610 but escaped captivity. The following year Jesuit priest Pierre Biard found the younger DuPont and brought him out on White Head Island to take public Confession, participate in Holy Mass and receive Communion reconciling himself to Poutrincourt. The younger DuPont asked Poutrincourt to dine with him as he reclaimed the ship left to his care, but during the meal Potrincourt lost his temper and seized the ship requiring Biard to come out again to make peace between the pair.

Port-Royal was re-established and was successful until destroyed by a British raid in 1613.

Following the destruction of Port-Royal, Poutrincourt returned to a military career in France, where he became a victim of a dynastic dispute between Henri IV's widow, Marie de Medici, and Henri de Bourbon, Prince de Condé. In 1615, Poutrincourt was killed during a battle over possession of the town of Méry, in the Champagne region.

== See also ==
Order of Good Cheer
