= Anthony Beale (fur trader) =

Anthony Beale (c. 1664 – 13 April 1731) became a governor and chief commander for the Hudson's Bay Company in James Bay.

Beale was an apprentice with the Hudson's Bay Company starting in 1678. He rose gradually through the ranks of the company and received his appointment as governor in 1705. He served until 1714 when the Treaty of Utrecht gave the British sovereignty over Rupert's Land. This changed the fabric and scope of the HBC operations and, in 1714, Beale was recalled to England.
