= Joseph de Monic =

French military officer and administrator

Joseph de Monic (c. 1650 – October 17, 1707) military officer and administrator, acting Governor of Newfoundland, born Oloron, Béarn died Bayonne.

Monic was promoted to captain before he came to Canada in 1687 where he was then promoted to the garrison adjutant at Québec. In 1697 he was appointed temporary governor at Plaisance. Monic never achieved full governor status because of his misunderstandings with his senior lieutenants. He was recalled to France in 1702 when the King had learned of his trading relationship with Boston to overcome a food shortage.

When in France he served at Rochefort and was dubbed a knight of the Order of Saint Louis in May 1707.

== See also ==
- Governors of Newfoundland
- List of people of Newfoundland and Labrador

Political offices
Preceded by Jacques-François de Monbeton de Brouillan	Governor of Plaisance (acting); 1697–1702	Succeeded by Daniel d'Auger de Subercase
