= Louis-Hector de Callière =

French soldier and governor of New France (1648–1703)

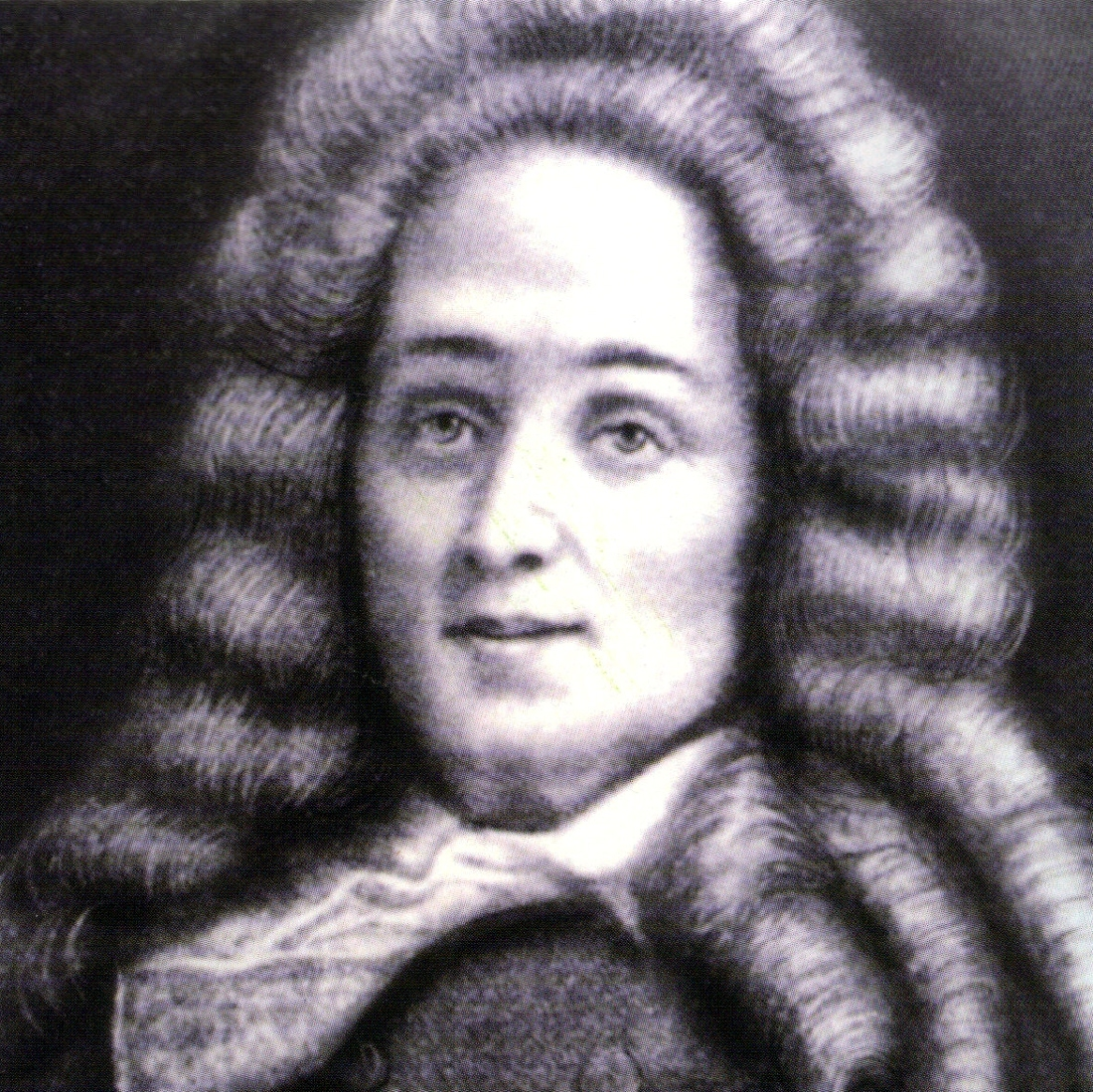

Governor of Montreal
- In office 1684–1699
- Preceded by: Thomas Tarieu de LaNouguère
- Succeeded by: François Provost

Governor of New France
- In office 1698–1703
- Monarch: Louis XIV
- Preceded by: Louis de Buade de Frontenac
- Succeeded by: Philippe de Rigaud Vaudreuil

Personal details
- Born: 12 November 1648 Torigni-sur-Vire, Manche
- Died: 26 May 1703 (aged 54) Quebec City
- Relations: François de Callières
- Parent(s): Madeleine Potier de Courcy; Jacques de Callières

Louis-Hector de Callière or Callières (French pronunciation: [lwi ɛktɔʁ də kaljɛʁ]; 12 November 1648 – 26 May 1703) was a French military officer, who served as governor of Montreal (1684–1699), and the 13th governor of New France from 1698 to 1703.

During his tenure as governor of Montreal, the Iroquois war enhanced the position's importance. He was awarded the prestigious cross of Saint-Louis in 1694 partly on the recommendation of Buade de Frontenac. He played an important role in defining the strategy that New France followed during Queen Anne's War. He ranked as captain in the regiment of Navarre. He moved to Canada in 1684, and was appointed Governor of Montreal at the request of the Sulpicians who were Seigneurs of the island. The situation at that time was dire, owing to Frontenac's departure, the weakness of Governor de la Barre, and the error of the French government in sending some Iroquois chiefs captured at Cataracoui (Kingston) to be galley slaves in France.

In 1689 Callières proposed to Louis XIV to invade New England by land and sea, and obtained the reappointment of Frontenac as governor. In 1690 he marched to the defense of Quebec, when it was besieged by William Phips. A valiant and experienced soldier, he aided Frontenac in saving New France from the Iroquois and in raising the prestige of the French flag. He was one of the first to receive the Cross of St. Louis (1694).

Having succeeded Frontenac in 1698, he devoted his time to the pacification of the indigenous nations. The treaty of Montreal (1701), agreed to by representatives of 39 nations, was the result of his efforts. This treaty is considered as Callières' chief claim to fame. That same year he sent Antoine Laumet de La Mothe, sieur de Cadillac to found Detroit.

== Family ==
De Callière was born in Thorigny-sur-Vire, Lower Normandy.

He was the son of Jacques de Callières, governor of Cherbourg and the author of La Fortune des gens de qualité et des gentilshommes particuliers, enseignant l'art de vivre à la cour suivant les maximes de la politique et de la morale ("The Fortune of people of quality and private gentlemen, teaching the art of living at court according to the maxims of politics and morality"), and Madeleine Potier de Courey.

François de Callières, the eldest son, was elected to the French Academy in 1689 and also served with distinction in Louis XIV's diplomatic corps. In 1701, thanks to his ability to imitate the royal handwriting and to his mastery of the French language, he succeeded Toussaint Rose as the secretary "who held the pen". His duties, designed to save the monarch time and fatigue, consisted of writing letters and memoirs to dignitaries and foreign heads of state in a hand and style similar to those of the king and signing them with the royal signature. Such a position of trust gave Callières great power that he frequently used to further the career of Louis-Hector in Canada.

== Legacy ==
One of the most conspicuous figures in Canadian history, he left a reputation of disinterestedness, honour, and probity. The Governor's residence in Montreal was located in Place d'Youville was built in 1688 and disappeared sometime around the 1760s. A plaque commemorating the location is at 224 Place d'Youville, an office building built in 1891 and gutted by a fire in 2023.

Government offices
Preceded by Louis de Buade de Frontenac	Governor General of New France; 1698 – 1703	Succeeded by Philippe de Rigaud Vaudreuil
