= Jacques-François de Monbeton de Brouillan =

Governor of Acadia

Jacques-François de Monbeton de Brouillan (French: [ʒak fʁɑ̃swa də mɔ̃bətɔ̃ də bʁujɑ̃]; 1651, Gascony – September 22, 1705 at Chedabouctou, Acadia) French military officer and Governor of Plaisance (Placentia), Newfoundland (1689-1701) and Acadia (1701–1705).

== Biography ==
Monbeton de Brouillan was born to a Protestant noblemen at Gascony and while serving as captain of the French forces in French Canada had renounced Protestantism and was baptized a Roman Catholic at Québec in 1687. In 1689 he returned to France and became governor of Plaisance on June 1, 1690. While at Plaisance Monbeton de Brouillan defended the settlement three times against British attacks, in 1691, 1692 and 1693. During a visit to France in 1695 he was instructed to team up with Pierre Le Moyne d'Iberville. During the winter of 1696–1697, with troops in the command of d'Iberville, Mombeton de Brouillan they attacked, captured and burned St. John's.

With the death of Joseph Robineau de Villebon, the governor of Acadia in 1700, Monbeton de Brouillan was given command of the government there in 1701 although the actual title of governor was not given until 1702. His poor health was evident during this period and he died in 1705.

He appears to have been an effective governor both at Placentia and at Port-Royal. His organization of defences in these two posts was notable. He also promoted the economic growth of Acadia by developing the fisheries, logging the forests, and building ships.

== See also ==
- Governors of Newfoundland
- List of people of Newfoundland and Labrador
- List of Acadian governors

Political offices
Preceded by Louis de Pastour de Costebelle	Governor of Plaisance; 1690–1701	Succeeded by Joseph de Monic
Preceded by Claude-Sébastien de Villieu	Governor of Acadia; 1690–1701	Succeeded by Simon-Pierre Denys de Bonaventure (acting)
