= Daniel d'Auger de Subercase =

Governor of Plaisance and Governor of Acadia

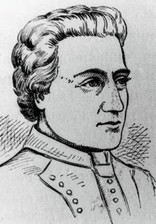
- Sketch of Subercase, date unknown

Governor of Plaisance
- In office 1702–1706
- Preceded by: Joseph de Monic
- Succeeded by: Philippe Pastour de Costebelle

Governor of Acadia
- In office 1706–1710
- Preceded by: Simon-Pierre Denys de Bonaventure acting
- Succeeded by: Samuel Vetch (Note: As Governor of Nova Scotia)

Personal details
- Born: 12 February 1661 Orthez, Béarn, France
- Died: 20 November 1732 (aged 71) Cannes, France
- Military career
- Allegiance: Kingdom of France
- Branch: French Navy
- Service years: 1674-1713
- Rank: Governor of Placentia and Acadia
- Awards: Order of Saint Louis

Daniel d'Auger de Subercase (February 12, 1661 – November 20, 1732) was a naval officer and the French governor of Newfoundland and later Acadia.

Subercase was baptised a Protestant, born to Jean d'Auger, a rich merchant and bourgeois who had purchased several noble estates, including the lay abbey of Subercase, near Asson.

He served about 10 years in the land forces and in 1684 was a captain in the Régiment de Bretagne, before he joined the navy and sailed for Quebec. No sooner had he landed in 1687 than he set off with his contingent on a campaign against the Senecas. In 1693 he was named lieutenant-commander, garrison adjutant and adjutant general.

On 1 April 1702 he succeeded Monic as governor of Plaisance, arriving at his post in 1703 during the early years of Queen Anne's War. He immediately attacked Ferryland, where he learned from prisoners of a planned English attack on Plaisance with a fleet of 33 sail from St. John's under the command of Admiral John Graydon. He immediately set the town's defenses in order and discouraged the attack with the help of two French warships. During the fall of 1704, he organized a series of attacks against English outposts on Newfoundland. With a party of 100 reinforcements from Canada and 350 of his own men, this campaign resulted in the temporary capture of Bay Bulls and Petty Harbour in January 1705 and a failed siege of the main English settlement at St. John's. Unable to subdue the fort, they set out to destroy settlements in Conception Bay and Trinity Bay and succeeded in destroying every colony, with the exception of Carbonear Island. The expedition took 1,200 prisoners, and boasted the destruction of 40 cannon, 2,000 shallops, and pillaged 2,600 livres in cash. Subercase estimated that, although St. John's remained intact, the total cost of the losses inflicted on the enemy was 4 million livres.

Subercase made full use of the following lull in aggression to rebuild the fortifications at Plaisance, improve morale, and generally improve the living conditions of the residents. In 1705 he was made a knight of the Order of Saint Louis and became the governor of Acadia in April 1706. He successfully led the outnumbered defense of Port Royal against two failed sieges in 1707, leading several sallies himself and having his own horse killed under him in one skirmish. The governor of Boston was not prepared to accept defeat and on 5 October 1710 General Francis Nicholson's fleet appeared before Port-Royal and began the Siege of Port Royal. The fleet comprised a landing force of 2,000 men (3,400 according to Subercase), made up of one regiment of English regulars and four regiments of militiamen raised by Massachusetts, Connecticut, Rhode Island, and New Hampshire, and carried in 36 vessels, seven of which were warships. Subercase had fewer than 300 men to oppose them. After a few days of defense, Subercase surrendered the partially ruined and under-provisioned Port-Royal to the British, expressing to the English commander his hope of returning to pay him a visit the following spring.

Subercase, accused of negligence by some officers and reprimanded by New France governor Vaudreuil, was summoned before a court-martial at Rochefort, but rapidly acquitted. In 1711 he was presented an offer to serve in Quebec under Vaudreuil, where he could formulate a plan to retake Port-Royal, while continuing to receive his salary as governor of Acadia. Subercase refused in disgust, and two years later the Treaty of Utrecht was signed ending aggression between the French and English and ceding Acadia and Newfoundland to England for good, thus making Subercase the last governor of French Acadia.

Subercase retired and returned to France to live on his estates in Béarn. He continued to draw a captain's pension of 600 livres a year until he died on 20 November 1732 at Cannes. A ledger-stone marks his grave in the church of this village.

== See also ==
- List of governors of Acadia
- Governors of Newfoundland
- List of people of Newfoundland and Labrador

== Notes ==
Political offices
| Preceded by Joseph de Monic | Governor of Plaisance; 1702–1706 | Succeeded by Philippe Pastour de Costebelle |
| Preceded by Simon-Pierre Denys de Bonaventure | Governor of Acadia; 1706–1710 | Succeeded by Samuel Vetch as Governor of Nova Scotia |
