= List of governors of Acadia =

The governance of the French colony of Acadia has a long and tangled history. Founded in 1603 by Pierre Dugua, Sieur de Monts, the territory of Acadia (roughly, the present-day Canadian provinces of Nova Scotia, New Brunswick, and Prince Edward Island, and portions of the U. S. state of Maine) was hotly contested in the 17th century. It was claimed by English and Scottish interests, fought over by competing French governors, and subjected to raids and attacks from English colonists that sometimes resulted in years of occupation of some of its communities. Most of the non-French claims were given up under the 1667 Treaty of Breda, but the territory did not come completely under French control until three years later. From 1670 until 1710 the province remained in French hands, except for a brief period in the 1670s when Dutch attackers occupied several Acadian communities. In 1710 a British expedition including Royal Navy warships and colonial forces from New England captured Acadia's capital for good, and France ceded an ill-defined territory to Britain in the 1713 Treaty of Utrecht. Although France continued to claim those portions of present-day Maine and New Brunswick that constituted part of Acadia, it had no formal government prior to the British conquest of New France in 1760. The first British governor of Nova Scotia was Samuel Vetch; he took command immediately after the 1710 capture.

Most of Acadia's French governors operated under commissions given by the French crown. During the periods of turmoil in the mid-17th century, they acted more like proprietary governors, acting primarily in their own interests, or in those of their corporate supporters. A Scottish proprietary colony named New Scotland (the origin of the name "Nova Scotia") was granted to William Stirling in 1621; this claim was formally abandoned with the 1632 Treaty of Saint-Germain-en-Laye. Even though there were English claims to the territory under the 1620 charter granted to the Plymouth Council for New England, there was no English settlement of the territory under its authority. In 1656 two Englishmen, Thomas Temple and William Crowne, acquired the French interest of Charles de Saint-Étienne de la Tour, who had been governing part of the territory under a French commission. They ruled over his territories until 1670, when they turned their lands over to French governor Hector d'Andigné de Grandfontaine. Some of the later appointments were not as governors; these were military men who were commissioned as commandant of Acadia, and acted under the direction of the Governor General of New France.

Governor	Term	Granting authority	Notes
Pierre Dugua, Sieur de Monts	1603–1608	French crown	Dugua and Samuel de Champlain established the first settlement in Acadia on St. Croix Island in 1603. After a harsh winter, they moved across the Bay of Fundy to establish Port Royal.
Jean de Biencourt de Poutrincourt et de Saint-Just	1606–1615	French crown	Poutrincourt's first charter was revoked in 1607; he received a new grant from King Henry in 1608, but did not resettle Port Royal until 1610. He only effectively governed until 1613, when Samuel Argall destroyed Port Royal in a raid. Only a few colonists remained, under Biencourt, who was Poutrincourt's son.
Charles de Biencourt de Saint-Just	1615–1623	French crown	Biencourt inherited his father's commission upon the latter's death. The colony remained small, subsisting on fishing and the fur trade.
William Alexander	1621–1629	Scottish crown	Alexander was granted a proprietorship to establish New Scotland. Despite a lack of settlement, his grant was renewed in 1625. Alexander and his son attempted to interest Claude de Saint-Étienne de la Tour, who had come to Acadia with his son Charles on Poutrincourt's expedition.
William Alexander the younger	1629–1632	Scottish crown	Alexander inherited his father's claim. He settled Port Royal and an outpost on Cape Breton Island with Scottish colonists in 1629. The Alexander's claim was extinguished in the 1632 Treaty of Saint-Germain-en-Laye, and the Scots abandoned the colony.
Charles de Saint-Étienne de la Tour	1631–1644	French crown	La Tour inherited Biencourt's commission, but this was not recognized by the crown. He built up a strong presence at Cape Sable, and was issued a charter in his own right in 1631.
Isaac de Razilly	1632–1635	French crown	Razilly's charter conflicted with La Tour's, and King Louis XIII's division of their authorities was geographically uninformed. Although Razilly and La Tour had an amicable relationship, their successors battled each other for control of various parts of Acadia. Razilly established his base at La Héve on the Atlantic coast.
Charles de Menou d'Aulnay	1635–1650	French crown	D'Aulnay governed on behalf of Claude de Razilly, who inherited his brother's charter but was unable to come to Acadia. Disagreements between La Tour and d'Aulnay broke out into open violence in the late 1630s. Both appealed to New England colonists at one time or another for assistance. He succeeded in having La Tour "discredited" in 1644, and used military force in an attempt to drive La Tour from his holdings.
Charles de Saint-Étienne de la Tour	1653–1654	French crown	La Tour refused to surrender territories he was holding when driven from office in 1644, and appealed to New England colonists, with whom Acadians had been trading, for aid. When d'Aulnay died in 1650, La Tour went to France, was vindicated in inquiries, and returned to Acadia in 1653 with a new commission. He cemented his interests in Acadia by marrying d'Aulnay's widow. Following the capture of Port Royal by an English expedition led by Robert Sedgwick, La Tour was captured and sent to England. In 1657 La Tour sold his claim to Thomas Temple and William Crowne, which included recognition by Oliver Cromwell as baronet of Nova Scotia, a title La Tour's father had been granted by the Alexanders.
John Leverett	1654–1657	English military command	Leverett was placed in command of the sites captured by Sedgwick in his 1654 expedition. His command ended with the arrival of Thomas Temple.
Nicolas Denys	1654–1688	French crown	Denys had arrived in Acadia as one of Isaac Razilly's lieutenants. He was granted a charter for coastal areas from Canso north along the coast of the Gulf of Saint Lawrence, including present-day Prince Edward Island and Cape Breton Island, and a monopoly on fishing rights as far south as Virginia. He established several communities on the territory, but none grew to any significant size, and his charter seems to have been extinguished with his death. He spent much effort attempting to enforce his monopoly on fishing rights.
William Crowne and Thomas Temple	1657–1670	The Protectorate	Crowne and Temple claimed Nova Scotia as a proprietorship authorized by Oliver Cromwell, after purchasing Charles La Tour's interests. Their claim was disputed militarily by Emmanuel Le Borgne, who was granted a French charter in 1657. In 1667, the Treaty of Breda, which ended the Second Anglo-Dutch War, called for the return of Acadia to France. Crowne and Temple consequently abandoned their claim in 1670.
Emmanuel Le Borgne	1657–1667	French crown	Le Borgne was a creditor of d'Aulnay's. Shortly after La Tour's return to Acadia in 1653, Le Borgne arrived to negotiate for payment of the debts owed him. His efforts to collect disturbed by the English intervention in 1654, he acquired a charter from King Louis XIV. Unable to collect because of Crowne and Temple's occupation of La Tour's holdings, his land grants were renewed in 1667, but his governorship went to his son.
Alexandre Le Borgne de Belle-Isle	1667–1670	French crown	Belle-Isle, despite the Treaty of Breda's terms, was unable to take control of Acadia from Crowne and Temple because France could not guarantee certain preconditions to the handover. He consequently never actually governed, and the Englishmen turned Acadia over to his successor, Hector d'Andigné de Grandfontaine.
Hector d'Andigné de Grandfontaine	1670–1673	French crown	Grandfontaine, a military officer, spent most of his term in office restoring order after the preceding years of chaos. He established his headquarters at Fort Pentagouet, partly as a deterrent against the English, who also claimed the area.
Jacques de Chambly	1673–1677	French crown	Most of Chambly's term in office was disrupted by the attack of the Dutchman Jurriaen Aernoutsz, who seized a number of the key communities and claimed Acadia as New Holland. Aernoutsz left John Rhoades in command.
John Rhoades	1674–1675	Dutch military command	Rhoades, an Englishman from Massachusetts, was captured and taken to Boston after men under his command captured New England trading ships in Acadian waters. France was consequently able to recover the territory without resistance.
Cornelius Van Steenwyk	1676	Dutch West India Company	Van Steenwyk was a Dutch merchant from New York. The Dutch West India Company, seeking to capitalize on Aernoutsz's actions, granted him a commission as Governor of New Holland. Because of Rhoades' capture by the English, this claim existed only on paper.
Pierre de Joybert de Soulanges et de Marson (commandant)	1677–1678	French crown	In Joybert's brief term in office he moved the capital to Jemseg, where he had been granted land for his military service. He died in 1678.
Michel Leneuf de la Vallière de Beaubassin	1678–1684	French crown	Beaubassin replaced Joybert as commandant, and based himself primarily at Beaubassin on the Isthmus of Chignecto. Commissioned as governor in 1683, he was criticized for allowing New Englanders to fish in Acadian waters (against orders from the king forbidding such activity).
François-Marie Perrot	1684–1687	French crown	Little is known of Perrot's time as governor of Acadia. He apparently did not actually arrive at Port Royal until 1685, and sought to monopolize trade for his own benefit. He also permitted New Englanders to fish in Acadian waters in exchange for a small fee.
Louis-Alexandre des Friches de Meneval	1687–1690	French crown	Meneval, a lieutenant in the troupes de la marine, worked to improve Acadia's defenses against English attacks. In 1690, after the Nine Years' War broke out, he surrendered Port Royal, whose fort was only half-finished, to an expedition led by William Phips.
Charles La Tourasse	1690	English military command	La Tourasse was a sergeant in the French garrison at the time of Phips' expedition. Phips placed him at the head of a council of locals (that notably included Alexandre Le Borgne de Belle-Isle) to govern the colony in his absence. Tourasse's tenure in authority ended with Villebon's arrival, but Tourasse remained in command of Port Royal.
Edward Tyng	1691	English military command	Tyng was appointed Governor of Acadia until he was captured by Villebon and died in prison.
Joseph Robineau de Villebon (commandant)	1691–1700	French crown	Robineau arrived at Port Royal not long after Phips departed. As de facto French commander, he immediately relocated the seat of government to Jemseg, and was eventually given a commission as commandant of Acadia in 1691. He directed French military efforts against New England until the end of the Nine Years' War in 1697. Villebon's treatment of the inhabitants was at times controversial.
Claude-Sébastien de Villieu (acting commandant)	1700–1701	French crown	Villieu governed the colony after Villebon's death until his successor de Brouillan arrived. He also acted as acting commander during some of de Brouillan's absences from the colony.
Jacques-François de Monbeton de Brouillan	1701–1705	French crown	De Brouillan's first commission was as commandant; he was elevated to governor in 1702. He was a corrupt and sometimes cruel administrator, who thought poorly of the inhabitants. He did restart construction of fortifications at Port Royal and organized the defenses there against an anticipated attack in 1704 by Benjamin Church. He left for France shortly after to defend himself against many charges, and died at Chedabouctou on his way back in 1705.
Simon-Pierre Denys de Bonaventure (acting)	1705–1706	French crown	Bonaventure petitioned to formally replace de Brouillan after the latter's death, but the position went instead to the governor of Plaisance, Daniel d'Auger de Subercase. Bonaventure governed until Subercase's arrival in 1706.
Daniel d'Auger, sieur de Subercase	1706–1710	French crown	Subercase successfully repulsed two attempts by English colonists to take Port Royal in 1707. He orchestrated highly successful privateering operations against the New Englanders, but was unable to prevent the capture of Port Royal in 1710 when the British provided the New Englanders with significant naval resources and regular troops to take the Acadian capital for the last time. After his surrender, the British renamed the town Annapolis Royal and installed Samuel Vetch as the new Governor of Nova Scotia.

== See also ==
- Governor of Montreal
- Governor of Plaisance
- Governor of Louisiana
