= List of governors general of Canada =

The following is a list of the governors and governors general of Canada. Though the present-day office of the Governor General of Canada is legislatively covered under the Constitution Act, 1867 and legally constituted by the Letters Patent, 1947, the institution is, along with the institution of the Crown it represents, the oldest continuous and uniquely Canadian institution in Canada, having existed in an unbroken line since the appointment of Samuel de Champlain in 1627.

== Lieutenant General/Viceroy of New France, 1541–1627 ==
No.	Portrait	Name (Birth–Death)	Term of office			Monarch Reign	Ref.
No.	Portrait	Name (Birth–Death)	Took office	Left office	Duration	Monarch Reign	Ref.
1		Jean-François Roberval (c. 1495–1560)	1541	1543	1–2 years	Francis I (1515–1547)	
2		Troilus de Mesqouez (1536–1606)	1578	unknown	unknown	Henry III (1574–1589)	
2		Troilus de Mesqouez (1536–1606)	1578	unknown	unknown	Henry IV (1589–1610)	
3		Aymar de Chaste (1514–1603)	1602	1603	0–1 years	Henry IV (1589–1610)	
4		Henri II, Prince of Condé (1588–1646)	1614	1619	4–5 years	Louis XIII (1610–1643)	
5		Henri II, Duke of Montmorency (1595–1632)	1619	1625	5–6 years	Louis XIII (1610–1643)	
6		Henri de Lévis de Ventadour, Duke of Ventadour (1596–1651)	1625	1627	1–2 years	Louis XIII (1610–1643)	

== Governors of New France, 1627–1663 ==
No.	Portrait	Name (Birth–Death)	Term of office			Monarch Reign
No.	Portrait	Name (Birth–Death)	Took office	Left office	Duration	Monarch Reign
1		Samuel de Champlain (1574–1635)	1627	1635	7–8 years	Louis XIII (1610–1643)
2		Charles de Montmagny (c. 1599–1654)	1635	1648	12–13 years	Louis XIII (1610–1643)
2		Charles de Montmagny (c. 1599–1654)	1635	1648	12–13 years	Louis XIV (1643–1715)
3		Louis d'Ailleboust de Coulonge (c. 1612–1660)	1648	1651	2–3 years	Louis XIV (1643–1715)
4		Jean de Lauson (1584–1666)	1651	1657	5–6 years	Louis XIV (1643–1715)
5		Pierre de Voyer d'Argenson, Vicomte de Mouzay (c. 1599–1654)	1658	1661	2–3 years	Louis XIV (1643–1715)
6		Pierre Dubois Davaugour (1625–1709)	1661	1663	1–2 years	Louis XIV (1643–1715)

== Governors general of New France, 1663–1760 ==
No.	Portrait	Name (Birth–Death)	Term of office			Monarch Reign
No.	Portrait	Name (Birth–Death)	Took office	Left office	Duration	Monarch Reign
1		Augustin de Saffray de Mésy (1598–1665)	1663	1665	1–2 years	Louis XIV (1643–1715)
2		Daniel de Rémy de Courcelle (1626–1698)	1665	1672	6–7 years	Louis XIV (1643–1715)
3		Louis de Buade, Count of Frontenac (1622–1698)	1672	1682	9–10 years	Louis XIV (1643–1715)
4		Joseph-Antoine le Fèbvre, Sieur of La Barre (1622–1688)	1682	1685	2–3 years	Louis XIV (1643–1715)
5		Jacques-René de Brisay, Marquis de Denonville (1637–1710)	1685	1689	3–4 years	Louis XIV (1643–1715)
(3)		Louis de Buade, Count of Frontenac (1622–1698)	1689	1698	8–9 years	Louis XIV (1643–1715)
6		Louis-Hector de Callière (1648–1703)	1698	1703	4–5 years	Louis XIV (1643–1715)
7		Philippe de Rigaud, Marquis de Vaudreuil (1643–1725)	1703	1725	21–22 years	Louis XIV (1643–1715)
7		Philippe de Rigaud, Marquis de Vaudreuil (1643–1725)	1703	1725	21–22 years	Louis XV (1715–1774)
8		Charles de la Boische, Marquis de Beauharnois (1671–1749)	1725	1747	21–22 years	Louis XV (1715–1774)
9		Roland-Michel Barrin de La Galissonière (1693–1756)	1747	1749	1–2 years	Louis XV (1715–1774)
10		Jacques-Pierre de Taffanel de la Jonquière, Marquis de la Jonquière (1685–1752)	1749	1752	2–3 years	Louis XV (1715–1774)
11		Michel-Ange Duquesne de Menneville, Marquess Duquesne (c. 1700–1778)	1752	1755	2–3 years	Louis XV (1715–1774)
12		Pierre de Rigaud, marquis de Vaudreuil-Cavagnial (1698–1778)	1755	1760	4–5 years	Louis XV (1715–1774)

== Governors of the Province of Quebec, 1760–1786 ==
Following the Seven Years' War, control passed from France to Great Britain in the terms of the Treaty of Paris, creating the British Province of Quebec. Governors subsequently served under the British monarchy.

No.	Portrait	Name (Birth–Death)	Term of office			Monarch Reign
No.	Portrait	Name (Birth–Death)	Took office	Left office	Duration	Monarch Reign
1		Jeffery Amherst (1717–1797)	1760	1763	2–3 years	George III (1760–1820)
2		James Murray (1721–1794)	1764	1768	4–5 years	George III (1760–1820)
3		Guy Carleton; KB (1724–1808)	1768	1778	9–10 years	George III (1760–1820)
4		Sir Frederick Haldimand; KB (1724–1808)	1778	1786	7–8 years	George III (1760–1820)

== Governors general of the Canadas/British North America, 1786–1841 ==
No.	Portrait	Name (Birth–Death)	Term of office			Monarch Reign
No.	Portrait	Name (Birth–Death)	Took office	Left office	Duration	Monarch Reign
1		Guy Carleton, 1st Baron Dorchester; KB (1724–1808)	1786	1796	9–10 years	George III (1760–1820)
2		Robert Prescott (c. 1726–1815)	1796	1799	2–3 years	George III (1760–1820)
3		Sir Robert Milnes, 1st Baronet (1754–1837)	1799	1805	5–6 years	George III (1760–1820)
4		Thomas Dunn (1729–1818)	1805	1807	1–2 years	George III (1760–1820)
5		Sir James Henry Craig; KB (1748–1812)	1807	1811	3–4 years	George III (1760–1820)
6		Sir George Prevost, 1st Baronet (1767–1816)	1811	1815	3–4 years	George III (1760–1820)
7		Sir Gordon Drummond (1772–1854)	1815	1816	0–1 years	George III (1760–1820)
8		Sir John Coape Sherbrooke (1764–1830)	1816	1818	1–2 years	George III (1760–1820)
9		Charles Lennox, 4th Duke of Richmond; KG, PC (1764–1819)	1818	1819	0–1 years	George III (1760–1820)
10		George Ramsay, 9th Earl of Dalhousie; GCB (1770–1838)	1820	1828	7–8 years	George IV (1820–1830)
11		Sir James Kempt; GCB (c. 1765–1854)	1828	1830	1–2 years	George IV (1820–1830)
12		Matthew Whitworth-Aylmer, 5th Baron Aylmer (1775–1850)	1830	1835	4–5 years	William IV (1830–1837)
13		Archibald Acheson, 2nd Earl of Gosford; GCB (1776–1849)	1835	1837	1–2 years	William IV (1830–1837)
14		Sir John Colborne (1778–1863)	1837	1838	0–1 years	Victoria (1837–1901)
15		John Lambton, 1st Earl of Durham (1792–1840)	1838	1839	0–1 years	Victoria (1837–1901)
16		Charles Poulett Thomson, 1st Baron Sydenham; PC (1799–1841)	1839	1841	1–2 years	Victoria (1837–1901)

== Governors general of the Province of Canada, 1841–1867 ==
No.	Portrait	Name (Birth–Death)	Term of office			Monarch Reign
No.	Portrait	Name (Birth–Death)	Took office	Left office	Duration	Monarch Reign
1		Charles Poulett Thomson, 1st Baron Sydenham; PC (1799–1841)	5 February 1841	19 September 1841	226 days	Victoria (1837–1901)
2		Sir Charles Bagot (1781–1843)	12 January 1842	19 May 1843	1 year, 127 days	Victoria (1837–1901)
3		Charles Metcalfe, 1st Baron Metcalfe; Bt, PC (1785–1846)	30 May 1843	26 November 1845	2 years, 180 days	Victoria (1837–1901)
4		Charles Cathcart, 2nd Earl Cathcart; GCB (1783–1859)	26 November 1845	30 January 1847	1 year, 65 days	Victoria (1837–1901)
5		James Bruce, 8th Earl of Elgin; PC, GCB (1811–1863)	30 January 1847	19 December 1854	7 years, 323 days	Victoria (1837–1901)
6		Sir Edmund Walker Head, Baronet; KCB (1805–1868)	19 December 1854	25 October 1861	6 years, 310 days	Victoria (1837–1901)
7		Charles Monck, 4th Viscount Monck; PC, GCMG (1819–1894)	25 October 1861	1 July 1867	5 years, 249 days	Victoria (1837–1901)

== Governors general of Canada, 1867–present ==
No.	Portrait	Name (Birth–Death)	Profession	Term of office			Monarch Reign	Prime Minister Term of office	Ref.
No.	Portrait	Name (Birth–Death)	Profession	Took office	Left office	Duration	Monarch Reign	Prime Minister Term of office	Ref.
1		Charles Monck, 4th Viscount Monck (1819–1894)	Politician	1 July 1867	14 November 1868	1 year, 136 days	Victoria (1837–1901)	Sir John A. Macdonald (1867–1873)	
2		John Young, 1st Baron Lisgar (1807–1876)	Politician	14 November 1868	25 June 1872	3 years, 144 days	Victoria (1837–1901)	Sir John A. Macdonald (1867–1873)	
3		Frederick Hamilton-Temple-Blackwood, 1st Earl of Dufferin (1826–1902)	Diplomat	25 June 1872	25 November 1878	6 years, 153 days	Victoria (1837–1901)	Sir John A. Macdonald (1867–1873)	
3		Frederick Hamilton-Temple-Blackwood, 1st Earl of Dufferin (1826–1902)	Diplomat	25 June 1872	25 November 1878	6 years, 153 days	Victoria (1837–1901)	Alexander Mackenzie (1873–1878)	
3		Frederick Hamilton-Temple-Blackwood, 1st Earl of Dufferin (1826–1902)	Diplomat	25 June 1872	25 November 1878	6 years, 153 days	Victoria (1837–1901)	Sir John A. Macdonald (1878–1891)	
4		John Campbell, Marquess of Lorne (1845–1914)	Author, politician	25 November 1878	23 October 1883	4 years, 332 days	Victoria (1837–1901)	Sir John A. Macdonald (1878–1891)	
5		Henry Petty-Fitzmaurice, 5th Marquess of Lansdowne (1845–1927)	Politician	23 October 1883	11 June 1888	4 years, 232 days	Victoria (1837–1901)	Sir John A. Macdonald (1878–1891)	
6		Frederick Stanley, Lord Stanley of Preston (1841–1908)	Politician	11 June 1888	18 September 1893	5 years, 99 days	Victoria (1837–1901)	Sir John A. Macdonald (1878–1891)	
6		Frederick Stanley, Lord Stanley of Preston (1841–1908)	Politician	11 June 1888	18 September 1893	5 years, 99 days	Victoria (1837–1901)	Sir John Abbott (1891–1892)	
6		Frederick Stanley, Lord Stanley of Preston (1841–1908)	Politician	11 June 1888	18 September 1893	5 years, 99 days	Victoria (1837–1901)	Sir John Sparrow David Thompson (1892–1894)	
7		John Hamilton-Gordon, 7th Earl of Aberdeen (1847–1934)	Politician	18 September 1893	12 November 1898	5 years, 55 days	Victoria (1837–1901)	Sir John Sparrow David Thompson (1892–1894)	
7		John Hamilton-Gordon, 7th Earl of Aberdeen (1847–1934)	Politician	18 September 1893	12 November 1898	5 years, 55 days	Victoria (1837–1901)	Sir Mackenzie Bowell (1894–1896)	
7		John Hamilton-Gordon, 7th Earl of Aberdeen (1847–1934)	Politician	18 September 1893	12 November 1898	5 years, 55 days	Victoria (1837–1901)	Sir Charles Tupper (1896)	
7		John Hamilton-Gordon, 7th Earl of Aberdeen (1847–1934)	Politician	18 September 1893	12 November 1898	5 years, 55 days	Victoria (1837–1901)	Sir Wilfrid Laurier (1896–1911)	
8		Gilbert Elliot-Murray-Kynynmound, 4th Earl of Minto (1845–1914)	Military officer	12 November 1898	10 December 1904	6 years, 28 days	Victoria (1837–1901)	Sir Wilfrid Laurier (1896–1911)	
8		Gilbert Elliot-Murray-Kynynmound, 4th Earl of Minto (1845–1914)	Military officer	12 November 1898	10 December 1904	6 years, 28 days	Edward VII (1901–1910)	Sir Wilfrid Laurier (1896–1911)	
9		Albert Grey, 4th Earl Grey (1851–1917)	Politician	10 December 1904	13 October 1911	6 years, 307 days	Edward VII (1901–1910)	Sir Wilfrid Laurier (1896–1911)	
9		Albert Grey, 4th Earl Grey (1851–1917)	Politician	10 December 1904	13 October 1911	6 years, 307 days	George V (1910–1936)	Sir Wilfrid Laurier (1896–1911)	
9		Albert Grey, 4th Earl Grey (1851–1917)	Politician	10 December 1904	13 October 1911	6 years, 307 days	George V (1910–1936)	Sir Robert Borden (1911–1920)	
10		Prince Arthur, Duke of Connaught and Strathearn (1850–1942)	Military officer	13 October 1911	11 November 1916	5 years, 29 days	George V (1910–1936)	Sir Robert Borden (1911–1920)	
11		Victor Cavendish, 9th Duke of Devonshire (1868–1938)	Politician	11 November 1916	11 August 1921	4 years, 273 days	George V (1910–1936)	Sir Robert Borden (1911–1920)	
11		Victor Cavendish, 9th Duke of Devonshire (1868–1938)	Politician	11 November 1916	11 August 1921	4 years, 273 days	George V (1910–1936)	Arthur Meighen (1920–1921)	
12		Julian Byng, 1st Viscount Byng of Vimy (1862–1935)	Military officer	11 August 1921	2 October 1926	5 years, 52 days	George V (1910–1936)	Arthur Meighen (1920–1921)	
12		Julian Byng, 1st Viscount Byng of Vimy (1862–1935)	Military officer	11 August 1921	2 October 1926	5 years, 52 days	George V (1910–1936)	William Lyon Mackenzie King (1921–1926)	
12		Julian Byng, 1st Viscount Byng of Vimy (1862–1935)	Military officer	11 August 1921	2 October 1926	5 years, 52 days	George V (1910–1936)	Arthur Meighen (1926)	
12		Julian Byng, 1st Viscount Byng of Vimy (1862–1935)	Military officer	11 August 1921	2 October 1926	5 years, 52 days	George V (1910–1936)	William Lyon Mackenzie King (1926–1930)	
13		Freeman Freeman-Thomas, 1st Marquess of Willingdon (1866–1941)	Politician	2 October 1926	4 April 1931	4 years, 184 days	George V (1910–1936)	William Lyon Mackenzie King (1926–1930)	
13		Freeman Freeman-Thomas, 1st Marquess of Willingdon (1866–1941)	Politician	2 October 1926	4 April 1931	4 years, 184 days	George V (1910–1936)	R.B. Bennett (1930–1935)	
14		Vere Ponsonby, 9th Earl of Bessborough (1880–1956)	Businessman	4 April 1931	2 November 1935	4 years, 212 days	George V (1910–1936)	R.B. Bennett (1930–1935)	
14		Vere Ponsonby, 9th Earl of Bessborough (1880–1956)	Businessman	4 April 1931	2 November 1935	4 years, 212 days	George V (1910–1936)	William Lyon Mackenzie King (1935–1948)	
15		John Buchan, 1st Baron Tweedsmuir (1875–1940)	Author, Politician	2 November 1935	11 February 1940	4 years, 101 days	George V (1910–1936)	William Lyon Mackenzie King (1935–1948)	
15		John Buchan, 1st Baron Tweedsmuir (1875–1940)	Author, Politician	2 November 1935	11 February 1940	4 years, 101 days	Edward VIII (1936)	William Lyon Mackenzie King (1935–1948)	
15		John Buchan, 1st Baron Tweedsmuir (1875–1940)	Author, Politician	2 November 1935	11 February 1940	4 years, 101 days	George VI (1936–1952)	William Lyon Mackenzie King (1935–1948)	
16		Alexander Cambridge, 1st Earl of Athlone (1874–1957)	Military officer	21 June 1940	12 April 1946	5 years, 295 days	George VI (1936–1952)	William Lyon Mackenzie King (1935–1948)	
17		Harold Alexander, 1st Earl Alexander of Tunis (1891–1969)	Military officer	12 April 1946	28 January 1952	5 years, 300 days	George VI (1936–1952)	William Lyon Mackenzie King (1935–1948)	
17		Harold Alexander, 1st Earl Alexander of Tunis (1891–1969)	Military officer	12 April 1946	28 January 1952	5 years, 300 days	George VI (1936–1952)	Louis St. Laurent (1948–1957)	
18		Vincent Massey (1887–1967)	Diplomat	28 February 1952	15 September 1959	7 years, 199 days	Elizabeth II (1952–2022)	Louis St. Laurent (1948–1957)	
18		Vincent Massey (1887–1967)	Diplomat	28 February 1952	15 September 1959	7 years, 199 days	Elizabeth II (1952–2022)	John Diefenbaker (1957–1963)	
19		Georges Vanier (1888–1967)	Military officer, diplomat	15 September 1959	5 March 1967	7 years, 171 days	Elizabeth II (1952–2022)	John Diefenbaker (1957–1963)	
19		Georges Vanier (1888–1967)	Military officer, diplomat	15 September 1959	5 March 1967	7 years, 171 days	Elizabeth II (1952–2022)	Lester B. Pearson (1963–1968)	
20		Roland Michener (1900–1991)	Politician	17 April 1967	14 January 1974	6 years, 272 days	Elizabeth II (1952–2022)	Lester B. Pearson (1963–1968)	
20		Roland Michener (1900–1991)	Politician	17 April 1967	14 January 1974	6 years, 272 days	Elizabeth II (1952–2022)	Pierre Trudeau (1968–1979)	
21		Jules Léger (1913–1980)	Diplomat	14 January 1974	22 January 1979	5 years, 8 days	Elizabeth II (1952–2022)	Pierre Trudeau (1968–1979)	
22		Edward Schreyer (born 1935)	Politician	22 January 1979	14 May 1984	5 years, 113 days	Elizabeth II (1952–2022)	Pierre Trudeau (1968–1979)	
22		Edward Schreyer (born 1935)	Politician	22 January 1979	14 May 1984	5 years, 113 days	Elizabeth II (1952–2022)	Joe Clark (1979–1980)	
22		Edward Schreyer (born 1935)	Politician	22 January 1979	14 May 1984	5 years, 113 days	Elizabeth II (1952–2022)	Pierre Trudeau (1980–1984)	
23		Jeanne Sauvé (1922–1993)	Journalist, politician	14 May 1984	29 January 1990	5 years, 260 days	Elizabeth II (1952–2022)	Pierre Trudeau (1980–1984)	
23		Jeanne Sauvé (1922–1993)	Journalist, politician	14 May 1984	29 January 1990	5 years, 260 days	Elizabeth II (1952–2022)	John Turner (1984)	
23		Jeanne Sauvé (1922–1993)	Journalist, politician	14 May 1984	29 January 1990	5 years, 260 days	Elizabeth II (1952–2022)	Brian Mulroney (1984–1993)	
24		Ray Hnatyshyn (1934–2002)	Politician	29 January 1990	8 February 1995	5 years, 10 days	Elizabeth II (1952–2022)	Brian Mulroney (1984–1993)	
24		Ray Hnatyshyn (1934–2002)	Politician	29 January 1990	8 February 1995	5 years, 10 days	Elizabeth II (1952–2022)	Kim Campbell (1993)	
24		Ray Hnatyshyn (1934–2002)	Politician	29 January 1990	8 February 1995	5 years, 10 days	Elizabeth II (1952–2022)	Jean Chrétien (1993–2003)	
25		Roméo LeBlanc (1927–2009)	Journalist, politician	8 February 1995	7 October 1999	4 years, 242 days	Elizabeth II (1952–2022)	Jean Chrétien (1993–2003)	
26		Adrienne Clarkson (born 1939)	Journalist	7 October 1999	27 September 2005	5 years, 355 days	Elizabeth II (1952–2022)	Jean Chrétien (1993–2003)	
26		Adrienne Clarkson (born 1939)	Journalist	7 October 1999	27 September 2005	5 years, 355 days	Elizabeth II (1952–2022)	Paul Martin (2003–2006)	
27		Michaëlle Jean (born 1957)	Journalist	27 September 2005	1 October 2010	5 years, 4 days	Elizabeth II (1952–2022)	Paul Martin (2003–2006)	
27		Michaëlle Jean (born 1957)	Journalist	27 September 2005	1 October 2010	5 years, 4 days	Elizabeth II (1952–2022)	Stephen Harper (2006–2015)	
28		David Johnston (born 1941)	Law professor, university administrator	1 October 2010	2 October 2017	7 years, 1 day	Elizabeth II (1952–2022)	Stephen Harper (2006–2015)	
28		David Johnston (born 1941)	Law professor, university administrator	1 October 2010	2 October 2017	7 years, 1 day	Elizabeth II (1952–2022)	Justin Trudeau (2015–2025)	
29		Julie Payette (born 1963)	Astronaut, engineer	2 October 2017	22 January 2021	3 years, 112 days	Elizabeth II (1952–2022)	Justin Trudeau (2015–2025)	
30		Mary Simon (born 1947)	Broadcaster, diplomat	26 July 2021	8 June 2026	4 years, 317 days	Elizabeth II (1952–2022)	Justin Trudeau (2015–2025)	
30		Mary Simon (born 1947)	Broadcaster, diplomat	26 July 2021	8 June 2026	4 years, 317 days	Charles III (since 2022)	Justin Trudeau (2015–2025)	
30		Mary Simon (born 1947)	Broadcaster, diplomat	26 July 2021	8 June 2026	4 years, 317 days	Charles III (since 2022)	Mark Carney (since 2025)	
31		Louise Arbour (born 1947)	Jurist	8 June 2026	Incumbent	151 days	Charles III (since 2022)	Mark Carney (since 2025)	

== Administrators ==
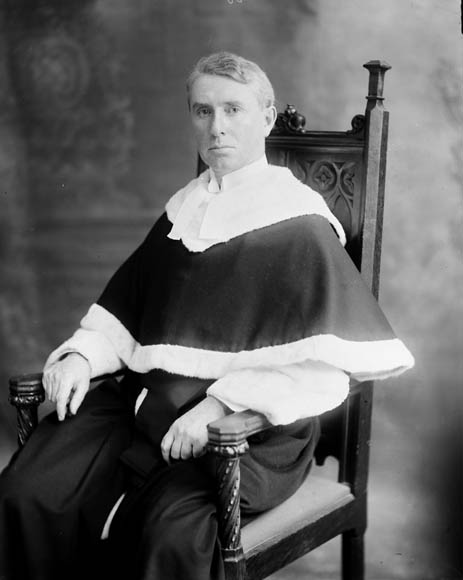
Chief Justice Lyman Duff was administrator of Canada in 1940.

The following is a list of Administrators of the Government, Justices of the Supreme Court of Canada who were acting governors appointed as the result of the death, resignation, prolonged absence of the sitting viceroy, or for any other reason:

1. Chief Justice Sir Lyman Duff, between the death of Lord Tweedsmuir and the arrival of Lord Athlone (February 11 to June 21, 1940);
2. Senior Puisne Justice Patrick Kerwin, during the absence of Governor General Lord Alexander and Chief Justice Thibaudeau Rinfret (June 11 to August 2, 1951).
3. Chief Justice Thibaudeau Rinfret, from the departure of the Lord Alexander to the installation of Vincent Massey (January 28 to February 28, 1952);
4. Chief Justice Robert Taschereau, from the death of Georges Vanier to the installation of Roland Michener (March 5 to April 17, 1967);
5. Chief Justice Bora Laskin, while Governor General Jules Léger was recovering from a stroke (July 2 to December 9, 1974);
6. Chief Justice Beverley McLachlin, while Governor General Adrienne Clarkson was hospitalized (July 8 to July 11, 2005);.
7. Chief Justice Richard Wagner, from the resignation of Julie Payette to the installation of Mary Simon (January 22 to July 26, 2021).

== See also ==
- List of Canadian monarchs
- List of female viceroys in Canada
- Viceregal consort of Canada
- Viceregal eponyms in Canada
