= Colbertism =

17th century economic and political doctrine

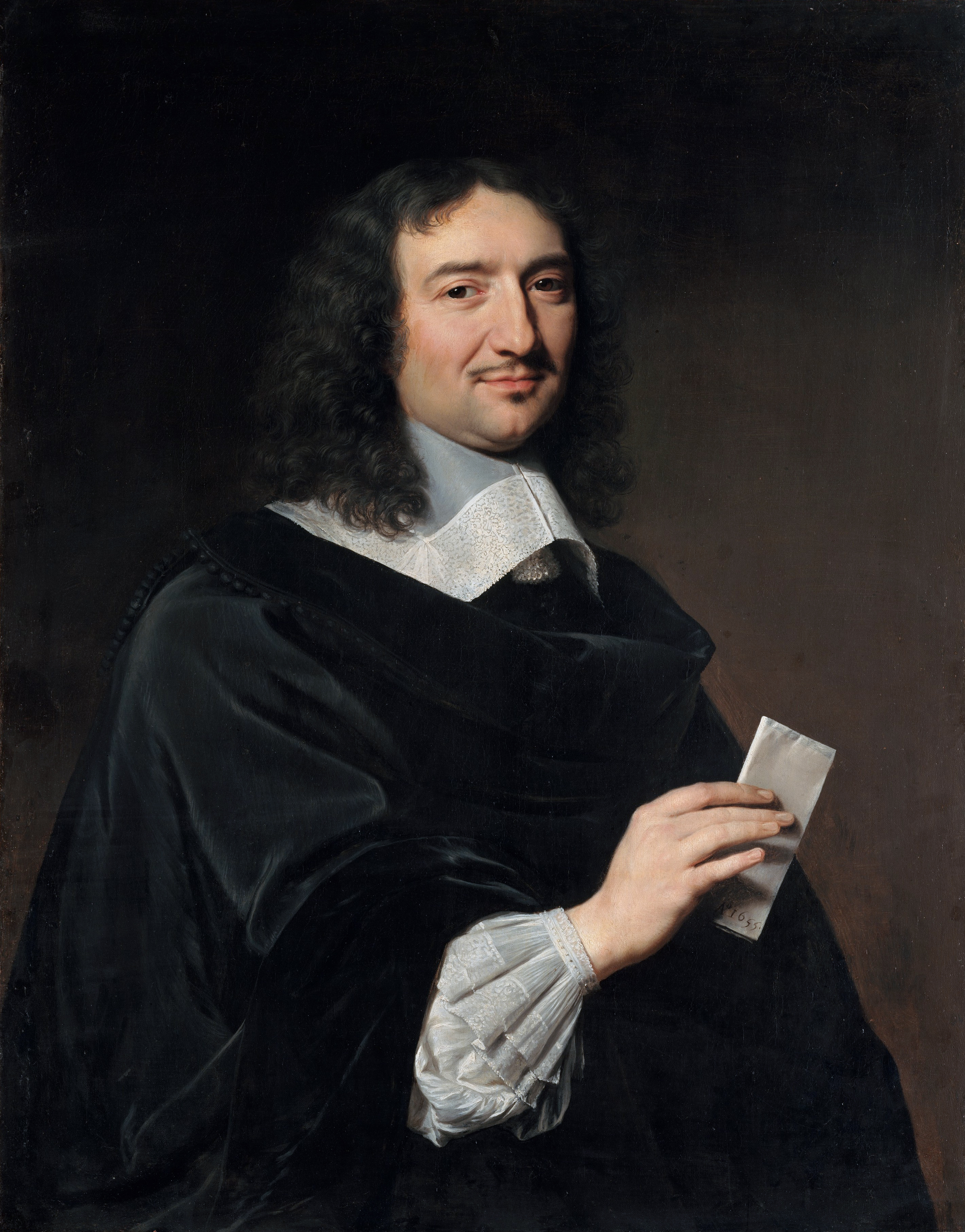
1655 portrait of Colbert by Philippe de Champaigne

Colbertism (French: Colbertisme) is the economic and political doctrine of Jean-Baptiste Colbert. Colbert was the Controller-General of Finances from 1665 to 1683 under Louis XIV of France. Colbertism is a variant of mercantilism, and is sometimes seen as its synonym.

The simplified objectives of mercantilism in terms of Colbertism were to improve the structure of taxes in the fiscal administration, or in the burden of taxes can enhance the nation's wealth, and of all the devices for increasing royal revenue in the king's fiscal arsenal the best is to improve trade and industry.

Colbert's central principle was that the wealth and the economy of France should serve the state. Drawing on the ideas of mercantilism, he believed state intervention was needed to secure the largest part of limited resources. To accumulate gold, a country always had to sell more goods abroad than it bought.

Colbert's main idea was a "favorable balance of trade" in which goods were exported for gold, versus an "unfavorable balance of trade" in which gold would flow out of the country. Colbert intended to get rid of internal tariffs, and to tax the nobility, but failed. Colbert did build a French economy that sold abroad and bought domestically.

== History ==
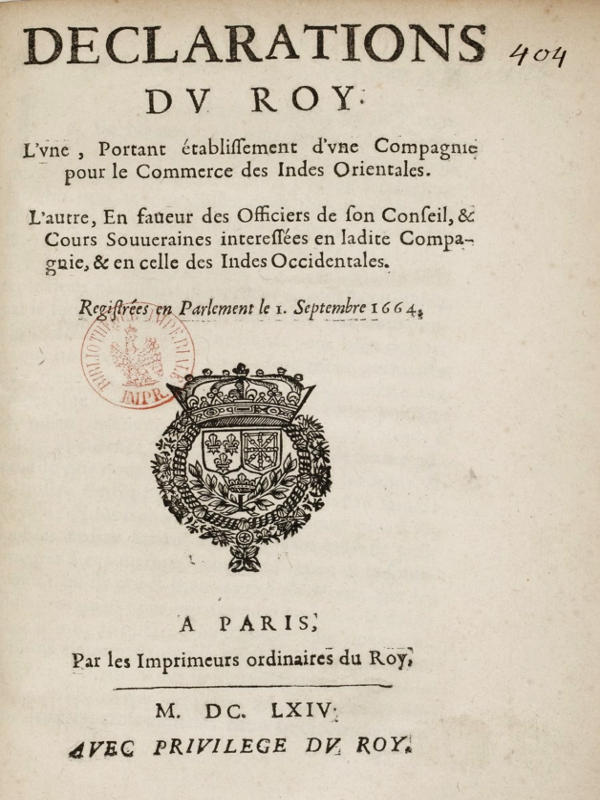
Declaration establishing a company for trade with the West Indies, 1664

By the 17th century, European powers had colonized much of the world. England had holdings in North America, India, and various other areas. Spain had holdings in South America and North America, and the Dutch had successful outposts in Indonesia. The French were beginning to colonize parts of North America, but did not have permanent settlements like the Spanish and British colonies.

In 1628, Quebec became controlled by the Company of One Hundred Associates, a merchant-run joint-stock enterprise founded by Cardinal Richelieu. The company received a monopoly over fur trade, and title to all the lands in New France, in trade for 4,000 settlers to the new colony, as well as supplies and priests. Like all other colonies, French influence in the New World led to problems with the natives: war for control of the fur trade and novel diseases killed off large portions of First Nations tribes.

France not only had colonies in North America, but also controlled the French West Indies, in the Caribbean Sea. During the 17th century, France colonized several of the West Indian Islands because of competition with the Spanish, English, and Dutch. Despite controlling very many of the West Indian Islands, only Martinique, Guadeloupe, and some nearby small islands survived as the French West Indies.

=== Carignan-Salières Regiment ===
In 1663, Louis XIV asked the Company of One Hundred Associates to relinquish its charter, and declared New France a royal province under his direct rule. The decision to make New France a royal province was motivated by mercantile ambitions. Colbert advised the king that revenues from the fur trade could be used to finance plans to push France to its “natural frontiers” in Europe. But if New France was to have a thriving fur trade and a self-sustaining economy, the Iroquois “menace” had to be addressed.

Louis XIV and Colbert took several steps to ensure the survival of New France. Alexandre de Prouville de Tracy was commissioned Lieutenant Général of the Americas and tasked with ending the Iroquois threat. Daniel de Remy de Courcelle was appointed Governor General to replace Augustin de Saffray de Mézy, and Jean Talon was appointed Intendant of New France. In a 1664 letter to Bishop Laval, Colbert wrote: "His Majesty has resolved to send a good regiment of infantry at the end of the year, or in the month of February next, in order to destroy these barbarians completely".

=== French West India Company ===
The French West India Company was the brainchild of Colbert. It was part of an ambitious strategy to compete with the colonial ventures of the Dutch Republic on a global stage, but did not survive the turmoil associated with the Franco-Dutch War in the early 1670s. In Africa, it was succeeded by the Compagnie du Sénégal, and by private traders' operations in America.

== Colbert's economic reforms ==
=== Changes to taxes ===
Colbert moved quickly to reform France’s financial system by targeting corruption and inefficiency in tax collection. At his request, the Crown established a judicial council in 1665 to investigate financial abuses, embezzlement, and irregularities committed by tax officials and revenue collectors, leading to punishments ranging from imprisonment to harsher penalties.

Colbert then focused on restructuring taxation. At the time, the Crown derived a significant portion of its revenue from the taille, a direct tax that fell disproportionately on the lower and middle classes, while the nobility retained exemptions. Rather than simply increasing taxes, Colbert sought to improve the efficiency and fairness of collection by tightening oversight, removing dishonest officials, and redistributing the tax burden through increased reliance on indirect taxes levied on goods. These measures significantly increased state revenues, which nearly doubled over the following decade, although the underlying inequalities of the tax system, including exemptions for privileged groups, largely remained in place.

=== Changes to the tariff system ===
Colbert also reorganized the French tariff system in 1664 as part of a broader effort to strengthen royal fiscal capacity and promote economic integration within France. Prior to these reforms, the French fiscal system was highly fragmented, with numerous internal customs duties (traites foraines) levied at provincial and local boundaries, applying to a wide range of goods and reflecting the legacy of feudal privileges. Colbert’s reforms sought to address these problems by consolidating and standardizing indirect taxation. Most notably, he established the Cinq Grosses Fermes, an internal customs zone in which the monarchy was more successful in imposing centralized fiscal institutions and reducing the autonomy of local authorities. Tariffs under Colbert were relatively limited in scope and often served administrative or fiscal purposes rather than forming a comprehensive protectionist system. In practice, they functioned alongside broader mechanisms of regulation and revenue extraction, reflecting a transitional stage in the development of French economic policy.

From April 1667 to June 1668, Colbert imposed punitive tariffs on the Dutch during the War of Devolution. Franco-Dutch trade declined by 30% due to French tariffs.

=== Industry reforms ===
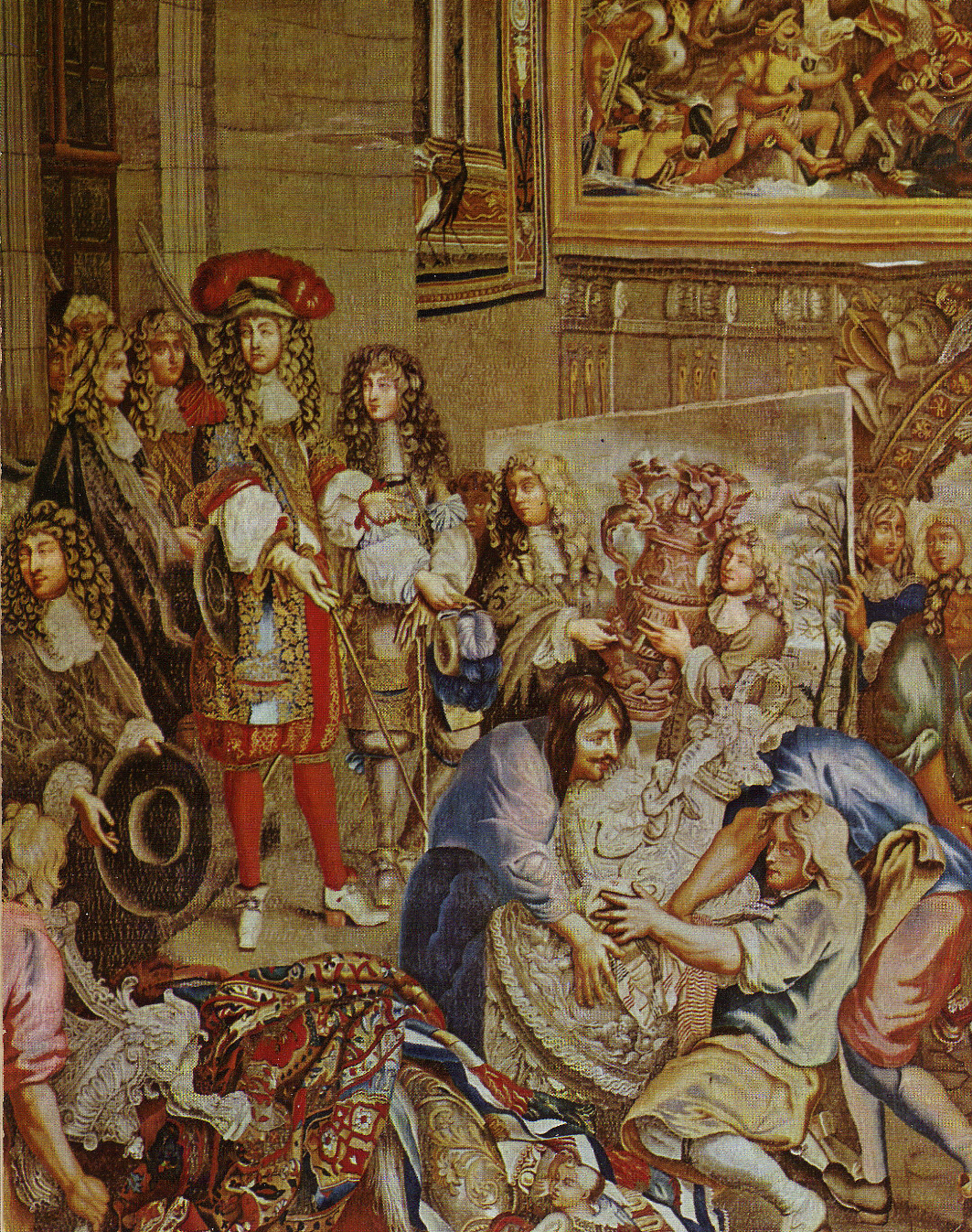
Louis XIV visiting the Gobelins Manufactory with Colbert in 1667.

He spent a lot of energy trying to reorganize industry and commerce. He believed that in order to increase French power it would be essential to grow France's share of international trade and reduce the commercial hegemony of the Dutch.

He stressed the production of high-quality goods that could compete with foreign products abroad but also the building up of a merchant fleet to carry them.

He tried to encourage foreign workers to bring their trade skills to France. To guarantee the standard of workmanship, he made regulations for every sort of manufacture and imposed fines and pillory for counterfeiting and shortcomings

He encouraged the formation of companies dedicated to building ships and attempted to obtain monopolies for French commerce abroad through the formation of trading companies. His system of control was resented by traders and contractors, who wanted to preserve their freedom of action and to be responsible to themselves alone. Thrifty people preferred land, annuities and money lending instead of investing in industry.

In May 1665, the king established monopoly privileges for a group of French lace manufacturers. The point of this was to prohibit anyone other than the privileged licensees from making lace.

Protective tariffs were levied on imported lace, so it could only be made in France. And then in 1667 they prohibited all foreign lace.

They next enforced quality standards on production and trade, which meant that the French economy was frozen at the level of the early or mid-17th century. This act prevented or slowed down innovation in new products, new technologies, and new methods of handling production and exchange.

He granted monopolies, subsidized luxury and the privilege of cartels, and built up a system of central bureaucracy. He created a formidable system of inspection, marks and measurements to be able to identify all those who were straying from the detailed list of state regulations.

He created a system of spies to make sure nobody was differing from the system, with punishments rating from heavy fines, public mockery or the inability to keep working in the industry.

Colbert achieved a remarkable short-term transformation of French industry: his policies stimulated the creation of state-sponsored manufactories, standardised production practices, and expanded key sectors such as textiles, glassworks, and armaments. This bolstered France to the preeminent European power under Louis XIV. However his heavy-handed regulation, reliance on centralised state monopolies, and enforcement of strict guild systems also introduced structural rigidities into the French economy and its industry. These constraints, though effective for maintaining quality and state oversight, later these constraints contributed to a lack of adaptability in French industry and a hostility to technological innovation. However it would be inaccurate to blame solely Colbert for the later French industrial lag.

=== Decree of 1670 ===
In 1670, Colbert made one of his most important single policy statements, in his famous memoire on finances. They can be expressed as follows: the object of economic statesmanship is to provide the monarch with the funds he needs for order and glory. Colonies can be planted and nurtured, home manufacturing improved in quality, internal transportation strengthened, the shipping industry expanded and the idle forced to work. Budgetary control must be put on a sound basis and the dominant revenues must be built up as much as possible. At the heart of this policy was the effort to increase royal revenues indirectly, through economic improvements. The universal rule according to Colbert is to control the economy and the fiscal system so that a sufficient quantity of cash will circulate in every corner of the country, giving all French the opportunity to make profits and pay taxes. His idea on how to lighten taxes was to "increase the cash available for general commerce [that is, all transactions] by attracting cash from other countries, keeping it inside the kingdom, and hindering its export, thus giving men the means to profit from it".

== See also ==
- American School (economics)
- History of economic thought
- Royal manufactories in France
- Mercantilism
