= 1612 in Quebec =

Events from the year 1612 in Quebec.

== Events ==
- Following the death of Charles de Bourbon, comte de Soissons, king Louis XIII appoints Henry II de Bourbon, prince de Condé new Lieutenant General of New France.
- Samuel de Champlain designs one of the first maps of North America

== Births ==
- Louis d'Ailleboust de Coulonge, Governor of New France (died 1660)
