= New Voyages to North America =

1703 book by Louis Armand de Lom d'Arce

New Voyages to North America is a book by Louis Armand de Lom d’Arce, baron de Lahontan that chronicles his nine years exploring New France as an officer in the French Army. Published in two volumes in 1703 as Nouveaux Voyages de M. le Baron de Lahontan dans l’Amérique Septentrionale, it was translated into English the same year.

Considered the best work on 17th century New France for its detailed descriptions of the environment and North American native society, the book includes accounts of the two winters Lahontan spent hunting with a group of the Algonquin people. Lahontan expresses his opinions of New France and the natives, as well as of European society, through dialogue between himself and "Adario", a fictional native based on the Huron chief Kondiaronk.

The volumes provide historical perspective on the landscape, the native peoples, and the developing economic, social, and political involvements of the French explorers. Gordon Sayre says of Lahontan that he "takes a secular perspective" and that this "differentiates his works from those of the Jesuits" who published during the same period.

== Volume I ==
Volume I has two sections: Lahontan's letters to a friend and his memoirs. Both provide descriptions of his journeys. The letters document his interactions with natives as well as superior French figures in Quebec, Montreal, and Sault Ste. Marie while the memoirs provide more in depth descriptions of geographical locations, detailed descriptions of the wildlife and lists of native vocabulary.

=== Letters ===
Lahontan writes twenty-five letters to an ‘old, bigoted relation’ for whom he promises to describe his travels and discoveries. They take place within the span of nine years from November 1683 to January 1692. The letters are lengthy descriptions that begin with one dated November 8, 1683 which tells of his voyage from France to Canada, in which he details a good trip with the exception of a storm that took place. They arrive in the bay of St. Lawrence and finally Quebec. Lahontan is particularly taken aback by the abundance of crops and land for growing as well as the existence of brothels in Quebec, which the French brought with them. He speaks of Quebec as the metropolitan of New France, containing upper and lower cities, the latter for the merchants and their homes and the former for the rest of the populace. The city is well built with lots of homes, six churches, a Cathedral in the upper city and a Jesuit in the lower and it is in letter three that he makes his first commentary on the native people – that he has heard they travel thousands of leagues in bark canoes. In June 1684, Lahontan writes about the Iroquois, who he describes as “barbarians” who are independent, consider themselves sovereign, and are constantly waging war. Lahontan discusses the peace talks the Canadians had with the Iroquois and the importance of bringing them into their commerce system of trade in order to stabilize the peace. The natives around Quebec were the Algonquin and Iroquois, the French quickly developed trade with them as Lahontan observes, it is made of largely of trading beaver skins for axes, arms, kettles, and knives.

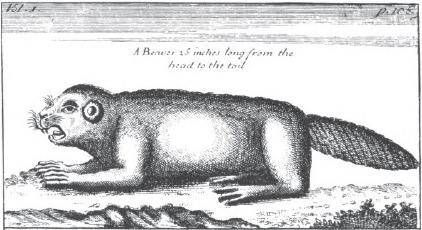
The beaver was an important feature of Algonquin life, especially for the fur and pelt trade but also in the everyday lives of natives as a source of food and warm clothing. (New Voyages to North America, 1703)

The waterways of Canada are essential for this trade to function because the native peoples' main mode of transportation used canoes, which could carry their furs for trade and allowed for them to navigate the St. Lawrence River. Lahontan notes that the natives are incredibly agile at navigating the waters. He spends a winter hunting with the Algonquin “in order to develop a more perfect knowledge of their language” while the city of Montreal is fortified to be protected against attacks. Lahontan writes that the way the Indians fought was comical, with their “bows and arrows and stark nakedness.” Montreal was the city of merchants, some traveling only once a year there to sell their goods such as wine. The governors spent their winters there as well, hence the need for fortifications. During the winter Lahontan is introduced to the native way of hunting elk, the use of “rackets” (or snow shoes) which he finds to be useful. He observes that hunting is a huge part of native culture for survival, unlike in France where hunting is a sport for the wealthy.

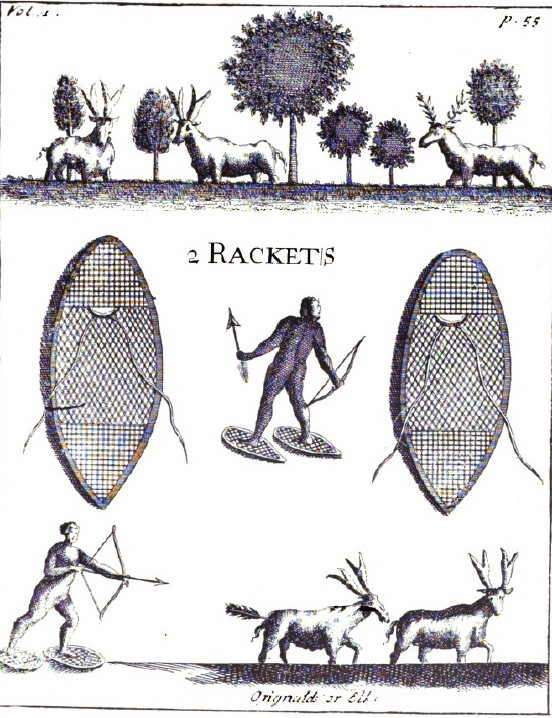
In the winter of 1689 Lahontan went elk hunting with a group of Algonquins. These snow shoes or "rackets" are what they wore when hunting. (New Voyages to North America, 1703)

In May 1689, Lahontan is issued with orders to march from Fort Michilimackinac to the Great Lakes and explore the waterways. During this journey, he has encounters with the Hurons at Fort St. Joseph. Lahontan continues his travels around the Great Lakes region describing the country around Michilimackinac, specifically detailing his trip down the “Rivière Longue” (some scholars argue that he had discovered the Missouri River, while others consider this a fanciful tale). Lahontan includes various descriptions of beavers and his own personal creation of maps of the region. After a final altercation with a group of Iroquois that ended in their deaths by burning, Lahontan heads back to France in October 1692. From Nantes, in 1693, Lahontan writes that he has been given Lieutenancy of the Newfound Land as well as an independent company and in January 1694 he departs for Portugal.

=== Memoirs ===
The memoirs are an expansion on the descriptions presented in the letters. Lahontan expands further on the geography of New France. He describes his journeys down into Lake Superior and then further south into Lake Huron and Lake Erie. While geographically situating these bodies of water he discusses what can be found on the shores of the lakes, citing the native peoples that live there as well as the animals that are present. He continues on with specific descriptions of the wildlife, fish in particular as well as the environment. He also provides vocabulary lists of native terminology.

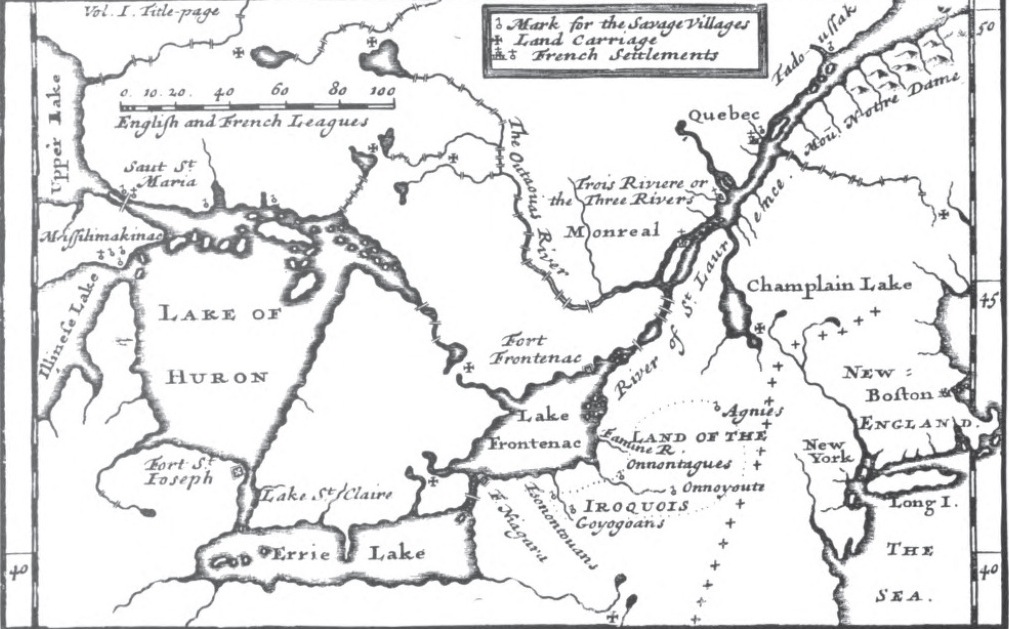
This map drawn by Lahontan depicts the geographical area of New France he traveled most notably the Lake of the Hurons (Lake Huron) and the River St. Laurence (St. Lawrence River) (New Voyages to North America, 1703)

== Volume II ==
Lahontan's second volume contains discourses on various topics of native life including: habits, temperament, customs, beliefs, love and marriage, diseases and remedies, hunting, military art, Coats of Arms, and hieroglyphics. The second half of volume II is a dialogue between the author and Adario, a fictional native Lahontan created, and lastly an appendix giving details about Lahontan's other voyages to Portugal and Denmark as well as maps and pictures.

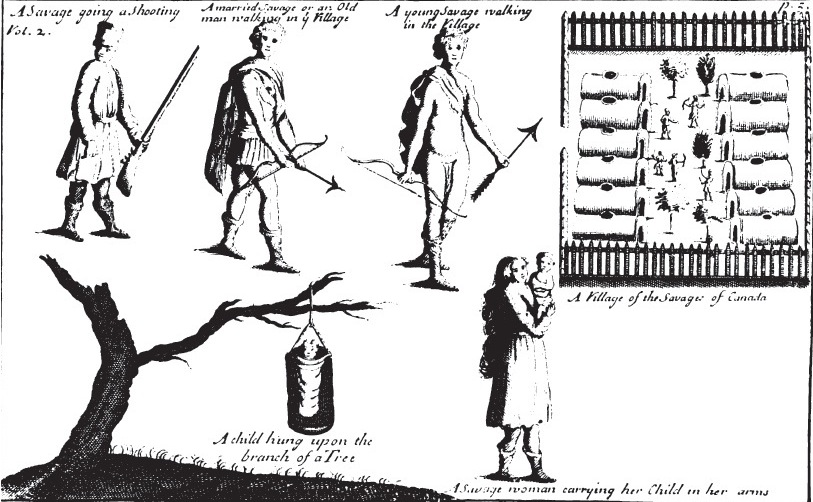
The discourse provides information that is easily visible in this drawing, information on child rearing tactics, native dress for various activities, and village plans. (New Voyages to North America, 1703)

=== Dialogue Between Lahontan and Adario ===
The dialogue is a conversation between Lahontan and a Huron, whom he describes as "a noted man among the savages". The two discuss the fundamental differences between themselves, Lahontan as a French man, and Adario as a Huron.

- First Meeting: They begin by debating whose is the greater god. Lahontan is a fierce defender of Jesuit teachings and the Christian God, while Adario speaks of the Great Spirit and the tyrannical nature of God for creating a man who seems to live in misery. Adario then comments on how the English and French each have their own god, and each believes that their own is the best. He continues by speaking negatively about Christians' use of scripture. He goes through the commandments Christians claim to believe and finds a negative example for each. He notes that the French trade on the Holy Days, they do not offer their most valuable goods as sacrifice to God, they lie and slander friends, and speak or take snuff during mass, all of which suggest the French to be infidels to their faith. Lahontan refutes Adario's attacks on the documents of the Jesuit teachings by pointing out that it takes strength to succeed in truly living up to the professions the French make about their faith, although he acknowledges Adario's statements as just. Lahontan finds fault in the sexual relations between unmarried Huron men and women, which Adario defends in terms of the Hurons' ability to explore and choose partners liberally. Adario continues with the argument asking Lahontan to refer to the behaviors of the "French man" and not "men" in general as he does not believe that all men act as the French do especially with reference to clergy in France, that teach purity but do not practice it. Lahontan defends the French clergy by stating that a few black priests are not representative of the institution as a whole.
- Second Meeting: Lahontan describes the importance of the Jesuit teachings of God, and Adario responds that those teachings are confusing and that the Jesuits may baptize as many Hurons as they wish but that they should never expect the Hurons to understand the significance of baptism. Along with the criticism of baptism he notes that the black devil he speaks of is not the soul but rather in France and French laws. Lahontan explains that the importance of law is not in the laws themselves but the judges that judge with virtue, in front of which a monarch is a slave. Adario still does not seem to understand and tells an anecdote in which he talks about a journey between Rochel and Paris during which he saw a man condemned to the gallows for "having a bag of salt on him" which seems totally absurd to him as well as the French laws against hunting game. Lahontan explains that hunting is a privilege for the landlords who have certain rights, however Adario simply views these laws as prison-like and would be of no use to the Hurons.
- Third Meeting: Adario explains that the more he thinks about the French, the less happiness he finds among them due to their interest in money and the importance of it in their society. However, Lahontan quickly assures Adario that Europe could not live without riches, gold and silver, and without money Europe would become chaos. Adario supports the Huron way of life, living in huts and shooting arrows, while Lahontan questions his commitment to truly believing that the Huron way of life of boiled meals and beaver skins is satisfying. Adario questions the French lifestyle and calls upon Lahontan to think about how his ancestors lived, to which Lahontan replies that Adario must "relish too much the savage strain." After a discussion on the tranquility of the mind, Adario suggests that Lahontan should become a Huron in order to prolong his life. Lahontan's response consists of worry for the risk such an act would engender in France as well as his questions about being able to subsist on the Huron diet, to which Adario proclaims Lahontan prefers slavery to liberty.
- Fourth Meeting: Lahontan comes to Adario offering sympathies for Adario's grandfather who is ill. Adario promptly blames the French medical methods for the deaths of others he knew and his discontent for the fact that men are dying that should have lived much longer. In this discussion Lahontan and Adario express their views concerning medicine. The dialogue concludes here with a reiteration of both Adario's and Lahontan's perceptions of French and Huron society: Lahontan compares the savage to a clown, and Adario claims that the French are as foolish as the natives.

== Interpretations ==
=== Les Sauvages Américains ===
Les Sauvages Américains by Gordon Sayre describes 17th century New France and North America by exploring both what Lahontan was writing about as well as Lahontan himself in order to create a picture of how Europeans were interacting with the Native Americans and how both parties felt about each other. Sayre writes that Lahontan’s “text both analyzes Indian life for insights into European culture and imposes European categories on Indian culture.” Sayre also points on that unlike others at the time who interpreted the actions of the natives from a religious and moral perspective Lahontan used one of enlightenment, puts him ahead of the times. This is especially true with reference to native customs, in which he believed that “strong passions such as love and jealousy were contrary to reason, and led to pointless strife and violence.” The work is significant in Sayre's opinion for its ethnographic fieldwork.

Sayre suggests Lahontan’s letters could be limited by “time and experience”, while the memoirs stem from a large collection of documents with some inconsistencies. He notes the historical value of details about the fur trade, pelt prices, beavers, geography and Algonquin customs, among other topics.

Lahontan’s dialogue is a noted literary work for his ability to transform his writing into a secular work that took opinions from both parties with considerable amount of satire that adds to the dialogues meaning and allows for varying interpretations.

== Legacy ==
Lahontan’s book remains one of the most influential in exploring the native life of New France in the 17th century. The book contained a vast vocabulary that Lahontan carefully noted. One such notation was omitted in the published translation of the book. It was Lahontan’s comments that instead of peasants or “Boors” one should say habitants, and today the Quebecois have pride for the nickname habitants, which they use for themselves and hockey team.
