= 1614 in Quebec =

Events from the year 1614 in Quebec. Samuel de Champlain spent the year in France and documented very little about his activities.

== Events ==
- Both the Compagnie des Marchands de Rouen et de Saint-Malo and the Compagnie de Champlain are founded by Samuel de Champlain, Lieutenant General of New France, and merchants of Rouen and Saint Malo.
