= Fort St. Joseph =

Fort St. Joseph may refer to:

In Canada

- Fort St. Joseph (Ontario), on St. Joseph Island at southern end of the St. Marys River, now the site of Fort St. Joseph National Historic Site Canada

In the United States

- Fort St. Joseph (Port Huron), on north end of the St. Clair River in what is now Port Huron, Michigan
- Fort St. Joseph (Niles, Michigan), on the St. Joseph River near what is now Niles, Michigan

Other

- Fort-Liberté, previously known as Fort St. Joseph, in Haiti
- Fort St. Joseph, Bakel, Senegal
