= 1611 in Quebec =

Events from the year 1611 in Quebec.

== Events ==
- Charles de Bourbon, comte de Soissons is appointed Lieutenant General of New France by king Louis XIII.
- Samuel de Champlain travels up the Saint Lawrence River and arrives on the island of Montreal. In 1535, Jacques Cartier had visited the island and discovered a large Iroquois settlement called Hochelaga. No trace of any settlement is found by de Champlain and his men.
- A fur trading post is established by de Champlain on a place called La Place Royale, the site of contemporary Pointe-à-Callière museum in Old Montreal.
- de Champlain returns to Quebec after a visit to France during which he fails to renew the fur trade monopoly on furs from North America. He manages, however, to secure the support of merchants in Rouen for the colony of New France.
- de Champlain and his men make their way up the Lachine Rapids, home to the largest standing waves in the world.
