= Marguerite de La Rocque =

French noblewoman

Marguerite de La Rocque de Roberval (fl 1515–?) was a French noblewoman who spent some years marooned on the Île des Démons while on her way to New France. She became well known after her subsequent rescue and return to France; her story was recounted in the Heptaméron by Queen Marguerite of Navarre, and in later histories by François de Belleforest and André Thevet. Her story has been retold many times since 1560.

== Early life ==
Marguerite de La Rocque's place and date of birth are unknown, but records attest to her declaration of fealty and homage in 1536 for her lands in Périgord and Languedoc. She was co-seigneuress of Pontpoint with her relative Jean-François de La Rocque de Roberval, a nobleman privateer favoured by Francis I of France (their exact relationship remains unclear; André Thevet claimed Roberval was her uncle, François de Belleforest indicated they were brother and sister, and historian Elizabeth Boyer suggests they were cousins).

== Voyage and marooning ==
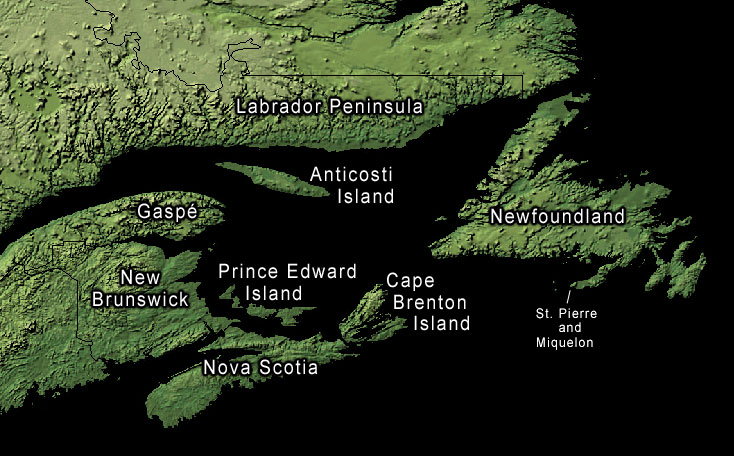
The Gulf of St. Lawrence

In 1541, Jean-François de La Rocque de Roberval was made Lieutenant General of New France, and the following year set out for the New World, accompanied by Marguerite, who was still young and unmarried. During the journey, she and a young man on the ship became lovers. Displeased with her actions, Roberval left Marguerite on the Isle of Demons. While possibly motivated by his Calvinist morals, it is likely he was also driven by financial greed, since his debts were high and Marguerite's death would be to his benefit. Also marooned were Marguerite's lover and her handmaiden Damienne. In the Heptaméron, the Queen of Navarre claims the lover was set down first, with Marguerite opting to join him; Thevet claims the young man swam to join Marguerite.

Marguerite's lover is intentionally unidentified in early histories; while presented in the Queen of Navarre's work as an unskilled labourer, this was, in part, to hide his identity, preserving the reputation of his aristocratic family.

While it is unlikely she was pregnant when first abandoned, Marguerite gave birth to a child while on the island. The baby died, as did the young man and the maidservant. It is possible the baby died due to insufficient milk, with Marguerite's diet being poor. Marguerite survived by hunting wild animals, and was rescued by Basque fishermen some years later.

The Isle of Demons is part of a group later known as the Isles de la Demoiselle, presumably named after Marguerite.

The Isle of Demons is reputedly off the east coast of Quebec, in an area known as the Lower North Shore. Local folklore indicates that the island is now known as Harrington Harbour. This is detailed in the work of Elizabeth M. Boyer.

== Later life ==
Returning to France after her rescue, Marguerite achieved some celebrity status when her story became known. She became a schoolmistress, and settled in Nontron, living in Chateau de La Mothe. There is no record of any action or charges brought by her against Roberval. Her death date and place is unrecorded.

== Literary representations ==
Marguerite's story was first recorded by Queen Marguerite de Navarre, in her work Heptaméron (published posthumously in 1558), in François de Belleforest's Histoires tragiques (5th volume, 1570) and André Thevet's Cosmographie (1575). The Queen of Navarre's account of Marguerite's adventures was a romantic tale, based on information provided by "Captain Roberval"; Thevet, who claimed he was told the story by Marguerite herself, offered more precise details, describing the journey, the settlers onboard the ships, and the location of the Isle of Demons. Text comparisons show that Thevet was at least familiar with the Queen's and de Belleforest's earlier accounts.

Marguerite de la Rocque's story has provided inspiration for several modern writers. One of the first was Irish-born, Montreal-based George Martin, who in 1887 published a long narrative poem entitled The Legend of Marguerite. In 1916, Isabel Ecclestone Mackay's narrative poem about her was published. In 1949, Dinah Silveira de Queirós published Margarida La Rocque: a ilha do demônios, inspired by Thevet's Cosmography; the Brazilian novel was translated into Spanish and French. In 1960, George Woodcock composed a verse play for CBC Radio entitled The Island of Demons.

In 1975, historian Elizabeth Boyer wrote the novel Marguerite de la Roque: A Story of Survival; and in 1983, A Colony of One: The History of a Brave Woman. In 1995, Donald Wilson Stanley Ryan republished George Martin's The Legend of Marguerite, over a century after its original publication, adding an explanatory introduction for the Breakwater Books edition. Charles Goulet's novel was entitled The Isle of Demons (2000), and Joan Elizabeth Goodman wrote a young adult novel in 2002 entitled Paradise. In 2003, Douglas Glover published Elle: A Novel, which won that year's Governor General's Literary Award for Fiction. Robert Chafe wrote a bilingual play called Isle of Demons, first produced in 2004. Canadian poet bpNichol depicted her in his poem "lament". British writer Sara Maitland discusses the story in A Book of Silence (2008) and in a short story, "The Tale of the Valiant Demoiselle," in Far North and Other Dark Tales (2008). Also in 2008, Annamarie Beckel wrote the novel Silence of Stone (published by Breakwater Books), about Marguerite's life on the island and later life. In 2016, Theatre Passe Muraille produced a play called Elle, an adaptation by Severn Thompson of Douglas Glover's novel. Swedish author Karolina Ramqvist references Marguerite's marooning, as well as de la Navarre's and Thevet's accounts, in her Björnkvinnan from 2020. The 2025 novel Isola by Allegra Goodman is also about Marguerite de la Rocque.

== In popular media ==
- The story of Marguerite's marooning was the subject of the episode "The Isle of Demons" of Pierre Berton's Heritage Theatre television series broadcast on CBC in 1986. Marguerite was played by Terri Hawkes and the series was written by Lister Sinclair and directed by Nigel Napier-Andrews.
- Aengus Finnan has a 1999 song called "The Ballad of Marguerite de la Roche", on the album Fool's Gold.
- The story, with claims that Marguerite and her lover's ghosts still haunt Quirpon Island, was featured in a 2006 episode of Creepy Canada.
- The Once has a 2009 song called "Marguerite", which they performed at the Ship Pub, St. John's, Newfoundland and Labrador.
- A Survivor's Tale, a 2025 feature film by Belgian director Micha Wald, dramatizes her story.
