= Kondiaronk =

Wyandot leader and orator (c. 1625–1701)

Kondiaronk's signature on the Great Peace of Montreal for the Huron-Wyandot.

Kondiaronk (c. 1625–1701) (Gaspar Soiaga, Souojas, Sastaretsi), known as Le Rat (The Rat), was chief of the Native American Wyandot (Huron) people at Michilimackinac in New France, where they settled after war with the Haudenosaunee in 1649. This is the area around the strait connecting Lake Huron and Lake Michigan and separating Michigan's Upper and Lower Peninsulas in the present-day United States.

Noted as a brilliant orator and a formidable strategist, Kondiaronk led the pro-French Wyandot of Michilimackinac, a mixed community of Petun and Wendat people, against their traditional Haudenosaunee enemies. In the chaotic and violent strategic environment of the Beaver Wars, he aimed to prolong the fighting between the Wyandot's main rivals, the Haudenosaunee and the French. Kondiaronk succeeded in this aim; however, once he had secured the position of the Wyandot, he favored a general peace settlement and managed to persuade all sides.

This effort concluded in the 1701 Great Peace of Montreal between France, the Haudenosaunee, and the other indigenous peoples of the Upper Great Lakes. This ended the Beaver Wars and helped open up the interior of North America to deeper French exploration and commerce.

The Jesuit historian Father Pierre François Xavier de Charlevoix wrote that "it was the general opinion that no Indian had ever possessed greater merit, a finer mind, more valor, prudence or discernment in understanding those with whom he had to deal". Louis-Hector de Callière, the Onontio (governor) that replaced Frontenac, was "exclusively indebted to him for ... this assemblage, till then unexampled of so many nations for a general peace".

Kondiaronk contracted a fever and died in Montreal during the negotiations for the Great Peace on August 2, 1701. His body was buried at Montreal's Notre-Dame Church after a majestic funeral. Today, no trace of the grave remains. The Kondiaronk Belvedere in Montreal's Mount Royal Park is named in his honor. In 2001, he was named a Person of National Historic Significance by the Canadian government.

== Early diplomatic efforts ==
Kondiaronk's first major role came in 1682, representing the Mackinac Wyandot tribe in negotiations between the French governor Frontenac and the Odawa tribe which shared Michilimackinac village. Kondiaronk looked towards the French for protection from the Haudenosaunee tribes after an Haudenosaunee chief, a Seneca, was murdered while being held prisoner in the Michilimackinac village. Afterwards, the Wyandot sent wampum belts to the Haudenosaunee to appease the murder; however, the diplomatic representative of the Odawa told Frontenac that the Wyandot did not send any of the Odawa's wampum belts. Furthermore, the Odawa insisted that the Wyandot placed all the blame for the murder on them. Kondiaronk maintained his position that the actions of the Wyandot were only to placate the Haudenosaunee, but the Odawa were not convinced and French efforts to conciliate the two tribes had little effect. Despite the tensions between the Wyandot and Odawa, Kondiaronk's appeal to the French did secure an alliance to stave off Haudenosaunee military advances.

== 1688 coup ==
By 1687, the French Governor General, Denonville, had taken over the land of the Senecas. Kondiaronk and the Wyandot agreed to ally with the French as long as Denonville promised that war against the Haudenosaunee would not stop until the Haudenosaunee were fully defeated.

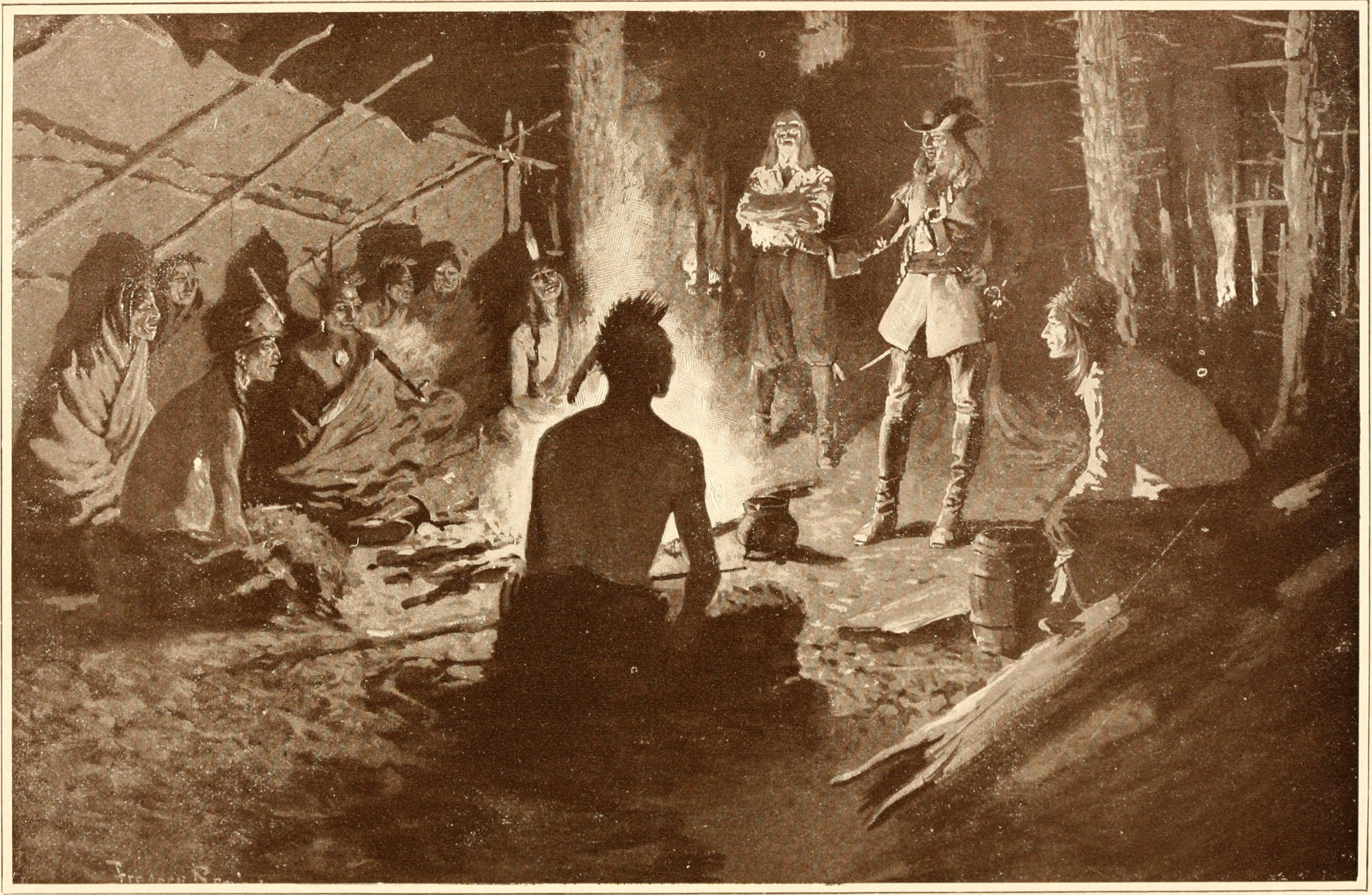
Kondiaronk speaking to the captured Haudenosaunee diplomats, 1688—as imagined in an illustration published in 1909.

In 1688, Kondiaronk formed a war party and traveled to Fort Frontenac on the way to raid Haudenosaunee villages. While at the fort, Kondiaronk learned that Denonville had begun discussing peace with the Haudenosaunee, despite his prior agreement with the Wyandot that war would continue. The war party withdrew back across Lake Ontario and waited for the Haudenosaunee Onondaga delegation to pass through on their way to Montreal.

When the Haudenosaunee diplomats arrived, Kondiaronk and his war party took them by surprise with a forest ambush. One chief was killed and the remaining Haudenosaunee taken captive. When the prisoners explained to Kondiaronk that they were a peaceful delegation and not a war party, Kondiaronk pretended to be astonished, then angry, with Denonville's betrayal. He told the Haudenosaunee captives,

"Go, my brothers, I release you and send you back to your people, despite the fact we are at war with you. It is the governor of the French who has made me commit this act, which is so treacherous that I shall never forgive myself for it if your Five Nations do not take their righteous vengeance."

Kondiaronk's war party returned to their village at Michilimackinac with an Haudenosaunee captive given as a replacement for a Wyandot killed in the skirmish. When the prisoner was presented to the French commandant at Michilimackinac, the Frenchman ordered him killed. The commandant was not aware that his government was trying to negotiate peace with the Five Nations—he was keeping in line with the current Wyandot declaration of war.

An old Seneca slave was summoned to witness the execution of his countryman, and afterwards Kondiaronk ordered the man to travel to the Haudenosaunee and report how badly the French had treated the captive. Since the captive was intended for adoption into the Michilimackinac village, the way his death was portrayed to the Haudenosaunee angered them because they felt the French disrespected their tradition. Due to Kondiaronk's skillful manipulation of events, the peace negotiations between the French and Haudenosaunee came to a halt—a satisfactory result for the Wyandot.

== Warfare and later diplomatic efforts 1689–1701 ==
Starting in 1689 a decade of warfare ensued known as Frontenac's War (1689–1697) that involved a series of conflicts between the French and the English. As a result of Kondiaronk's skillful manipulation, Frontenac's War included conflicts between the French and the Haudenosaunee. However, the years 1697–1701 marked the beginning of a period of intense diplomatic activity that would lead to the Great Peace of Montreal four years later.

Kondiaronk was held responsible for provoking the Haudenosaunee to a point where it was impossible to appease them, as exemplified by the sacking of Lachine during the summer of 1689. The Haudenosaunee, in retaliation to the French, burned, killed, and sacked plantations which left the Island of Montreal in a state of utmost dismay. However, Kondiaronk continued to prevent a separate French-Haudenosaunee peace by any means possible despite the aggressiveness of the warrior nation, the Haudenosaunee.

In 1689, Kondiaronk was caught plotting with the Haudenosaunee for the destruction of their Odawa neighbors.

As the Wyandot were split in a pro-French faction led by Kondiaronk and a pro-Haudenosaunee faction, in 1697 Kondiaronk warned the Miamis of an imminent attack led by Lahontan and his Haudenosaunee allies. Kondiaronk led 150 warriors into a two-hour canoe engagement on Lake Erie and defeated a party of 60 Haudenosaunee. This restored Kondiaronk's pre-eminence and the Wyandot's place as Frontenac's children.

With conflict in Europe ending with the Treaty of Ryswick in 1697, New York and New France agreed to suspend hostilities. New York encouraged the Haudenosaunee to make peace with New France. Since the Haudenosaunee could no longer use English military threat to their advantage against New France in September 1700 they signed a treaty to make peace with Frontenac independent of New York, which led to the first step of negotiations. Kondiaronk returned to Michilimackinac and urged all the nations of the Lakes to go there the following August essentially acting as an architect of the peace of 1701.

== Settlement of 1701 final Indian congress ==
The final Indian congress began 21 July 1701. The central goal was to negotiate a treaty of peace among the natives and with the French. One main conflict standing in the way of peace was the debates over the return of prisoners who had been captured during previous wars or other campaigns and enslaved or adopted. For Governor Hector de Callière, the conference was the result of 20 years of diplomacy.

Bacqueville de la Potherie (Le Roy), the primary source of information on these deliberations, went to Sault-Saint-Louis (Kahnawà꞉ke) to meet many of the parties at the village of the Mission Indians. The first flotilla that arrived carried nearly two hundred Haudenosaunee, headed by the ambassadors of the Onondagas, Oneidas, and Cayugas. The Senecas had dropped by the way, and the Mohawks would follow later. The men approached, firing their guns. The salute was returned by the mission Indians, who were their close brethren, and they ranged along the shore. At the water's edge, they were greeted by a small-fire and then retired to the main council lodge where they smoked together for some time in a mood of tranquility. That evening, the "three rare words" of the ritual of requickening were presented to them – these three concepts included the wiping of tears, clearing of the ears, and opening of the throat. The significance of this was to prepare them to begin the conference and deliberation the next day with Onontio.

The next morning the Haudenosaunee "shot the rapids to the main fire at Montreal, where they were greeted by the crash of artillery". They had scarcely disappeared when several hundred canoes carrying French allies appeared. This included Ojibwe, Odawa, Potawatomis, Wyandot, Miamis, Ho-Chunk, Menominees, Sauks, Meskwaki, and Mascoutens. In total, over 700 Indians would be received to great ceremonies at the landing. The Calumet Dance was a specialty of the Far Indians, and it was done to the accompaniment of gourd rattles. The dance was greatly significant to making friends of their hosts and instilling a feeling of cooperation and alliance. By 25 July, negotiations between the tribes and the French were fully under way. Kondiaronk spoke of the difficulties and struggles encountered in the process of recovering Haudenosaunee prisoners from the allies. He was suspicious of whether the Haudenosaunee would comply in an exchange with sincerity or cheat them of their "nephews", that had been taken over the past 13 years of war. He was concerned that the allies would be deceived, and yet, they were so determined to make peace that they were willing to leave their prisoners to display their good faith. The next day proved telling, however, as the Rat's suspicions were confirmed and the Haudenosaunee admitted that they did not have the prisoners that they had promised to return. They defended themselves by saying that, as small children, the prisoners had been given to families for adoption. They were, the Haudenosaunee said, not the masters of their young people. This explanation irritated the Wyandot and Miamis, as they had, in their efforts, forced their Haudenosaunee captives away from foster families to be returned. The following days were full of deep discussion and argument. Kondiaronk, having persuaded his own and allied tribes to bring their Haudenosaunee prisoners to Montreal, was angry and embarrassed about his failed efforts at an exchange. He returned to his hut that night and prepared to speak severely in the next day's conference about the importance of cooperation and compromise.

== Illness, death and legacy ==
Amidst the deliberations that last day of July, Kondiaronk became ill, unable to stand at the conference on 1 August. He was seated in a comfortable armchair, and after having an herbal drink made of maidenhair fern syrup, he was strong enough to speak. He spent the next two hours condemning the Haudenosaunee for their misbehavior, and additionally, recounting his role in averting conflict with the Haudenosaunee, his success in recovering prisoners, and his role in peaceful negotiations. "We could not help but be touched", wrote La Potherie, "by the eloquence with which he expressed himself, and could not fail to recognize at the same time that he was a man of worth." He retired to his hut after speaking, too exhausted to remain at the conference. He died at 2 a.m. the next day, at the age of 52. It was because of Kondiaronk's inspirational speeches that the remaining parties were convinced to sign the peace treaty, the Great Peace.

When his death was announced, many Haudenosaunee, who were well known for their death and burial ceremonies, participated in covering the body of Kondiaronk in a ritual called "covering the dead". Sixty men marched in a procession led by Louis-Thomas Chabert de Joncaire, with the Seneca chief Tonatakout, carrying the rear. The procession sat in a circle around the body, and a man appointed as the chanter paced and sang for a quarter of an hour. After him, a second speaker, Aouenano, wiped away the tears of the mourners, opening their throats, and pouring in a sweet re-quickening medicine. Then, after producing a belt, he restored the Sun and urged the warriors to emerge from darkness to the light of peace. Afterwards, he covered the body, which would be permanently covered later during a Christian burial ceremony at Notre-Dame Church in Montreal. The Jesuits claim to have converted him on his deathbed, despite Kondiaronk's lifelong rejection of Christianity. Contemporary scholars, however, generally reject this version of events as a political ploy by the Jesuit missionaries.

His funeral was elaborate, and both natives and French took part. French representatives were paired with delegations of a segment of Wendat-Petun society. Marching in front of the coffin were a French officer, sixty soldiers, sixteen Wyandot warriors, and French clergymen. The coffin was carried by six war leaders, and was covered with flowers. There rested upon the top of the coffin a gorget, a sword, and a plumed hat. Behind the coffin, Kondiaronk's relatives followed, along with the Odawa and Wendat-Petun chiefs. The wife of the intendant, Mme. De Champigny, the governor of Montreal, M. de Vaudreuil, and the entire officer corps were at the rear of the procession. The war leaders, at the grave, fired a salute. The inscription on his resting place read: Cy git le Rat, Chef des Hurons ("Here lies the Muskrat, Chief of the Hurons"). Today, there is no remaining trace of this burial place, though it is thought that he lies somewhere near the Place d'Armes.

The French idealized the deceased chief as a model leader who ruled through persuasion and consensus rather than force (in tacit contrast to their own monarchy). The French envisioned such chiefs as the governors of small principalities, and as allies and emissaries of the French government. This vision would cause tension between the natives and France until French Canada's fall in the mid-eighteenth century. Pennahouel, an Odawa chief who consulted with General Montcalm in July 1757, was compared to Kondiaronk, and "celebrated for his spirit, his wisdom" and his easy conversation with Frenchmen.

Kondiaronk was likely the basis for the character Adario in the Baron de Lahontan's New Voyages to North America (1703). Due to the popularity of this book, he became the model of the "noble native", a stock figure in European literature.

== Oratory ==
In The Dawn of Everything: A New History of Humanity, anthropologist David Graeber and archaeologist David Wengrow analyze the work of French explorer and philosopher the Baron Louis-Armand Lahontan (1666–1716), whose journals were published as New Voyages to North America in Amsterdam in the early 18th century. Graeber and Wengrow describe Lahontan's interviews with Kondiaronk, who is given the fictitious name Adario.

Kondiaronk's rhetoric was reputed to be unmatched. He was a frequent guest and supper debater with the Governor of Montreal, Hector de Callière, and he traveled on a diplomatic mission to Paris, where he attracted great interest in the salons. A 1699 conversation with Calliere, as recorded by Lahontan, is retold by Graeber and Wengrow:

Kondiaronk: I have spent 6 years reflecting on the state of European society and I still can’t think of a single way they act that is not inhuman and I generally think this can only be the case as long as you stick to your distinctions of “mine” and “thine.” I affirm that what you call “money” is the devil of devils, the tyrant of the French, the source of all evils, the bane of souls and slaughterhouse of the living. To imagine one can live in the country of money and preserve one’s soul is like imagining one can preserve one’s life at the bottom of a lake. Money is the father of luxury, lasciviousness, intrigues, trickery, lies, betrayal, insincerity—of all the world’s worst behavior. Fathers sell their children, husbands their wives, wives betray their husbands, brothers kill each other, friends are false—and all because of money. In light of all of this, tell me that we Wyandotte are not right in refusing to touch or so much as look at silver.

Do you seriously imagine that I would be happy to live like one of the inhabitants of Paris? To take two hours every morning just to put on my shirt and make up? To bow and scrape before every obnoxious galoot I meet on the street who happens to have been born with an inheritance? Do you actually imagine I could carry a purse full of coins and not immediately hand them over to people who are hungry? That I would carry a sword but not immediately draw it on the first band of thugs I see rounding up the destitute to press them into Naval service? If on the other hand, Europeans were to adopt an American way of life, it might take a while to adjust but in the end you will be far happier.

Callière: Try, for once in your life to actually listen. Can't you see, my dear friend, that the nations of Europe could not survive without gold and silver or some similar precious symbol? Without it, nobles, priests, merchants and any number of others who lack the strength to work the soil would simply die of hunger. Our kings would not be kings. What soldiers would we have? Who would work for Kings or anyone else?

Kondiaronk: You honestly think you're going to sway me by appealing to the needs of nobles, merchants, and priests? If you abandoned conceptions of mine and thine, yes, such distinctions between men would dissolve. A leveling equality would take place among you, as it now does among the Wyandotte and yes, for the first thirty years after the banishing of self-interest no doubt you would indeed see a certain desolation as those who are only qualified to eat, drink, sleep, and take pleasure would languish and die, but their progeny would be fit for our way of living. Over and over I have set forth the qualities that we Wyandotte believe ought to define humanity: wisdom, reason, equity, etc. and demonstrated that the existence of separate material interest knocks all these on the head. A man motivated by interest cannot be a man of reason.

Graeber and Wengrow illustrate by this conversation that European values have sacrificed the ability to conceive that the fundamentals of culture and social structure could be designed differently. Kondiaronk was willing to consider that native Americans could be assimilated into European culture, as indeed they were, but Callière was unwilling to even imagine the possibility of changes in the opposite direction.

Graeber and Wengrow make a lengthy case that dismissing attestations of indigenous people's philosophical statements as European literary fabrications is a form of anti-indigenous bigotry. However, the authenticity of this speech was contested by historian David A. Bell on the grounds that "anyone familiar with European fiction knows, there was no conceit more common for European authors of this period than presenting a fictional work as a first-hand account of real events." Wengrow has acknowledged the existence of such European fiction but contends that the "Dialogue Between Lahontan and Adario" is not part of that genre: “I think by comparing Lahontan to Gulliver’s Travels, Professor Bell has taken a step off the precipice, from which he may now have to extract himself.”
