= Dekanisora =

Onondaga chief and orator

Dekanisora (c. 1650–1730) was an Onondaga chief and orator. Holding a position on the Haudenosaunee Grand Council, he attempted to maintain peace between the Haudenosaunee and the French and English, and to maintain independence from both. Cadwallader Colden described Dekanisora as one of the world's best speakers.

== Life ==
Dekanisora was born circa 1650.

In 1688, Dekanisora was part of a group of Haudenosaunee who were captured and then released by Kondiaronk in a successful attempt to create conflict between the Haudenosaunee and the French. The group was told that the French were responsible for the death of one member who was not released with them, and attacked Montreal as a result.

In 1692, Dekanisora led n Haudenosaunee diplomatic mission to Montreal.

In 1694, Dekanisora was the organizer of a truce between the Haudenosaunee and the French in Quebec. After attempting to include the English in peace negotiations, he found that they did not want peace between the French and the Haudenosaunee, and asserted the independence of the Haudenosaunee while simultaneously promising their loyalty to the English. The 1694 peace negotiations eventually broke down, but in 1701, Dekanisora successfully negotiated a peace treaty between the Haudenosaunee and the French.

In 1726, Dekanisora was one of six Haudenosaunee ambassadors who made a trusteeship agreement to surrender the Haudenosaunee hunting lands to the King of England with the expectation that they would be maintained for Haudenosaunee use.

Dekanisora died in 1730 during a treaty-related meeting in Albany.
