= Saint-Germain-Laval, Loire =

Saint-Germain-Laval
- Commune
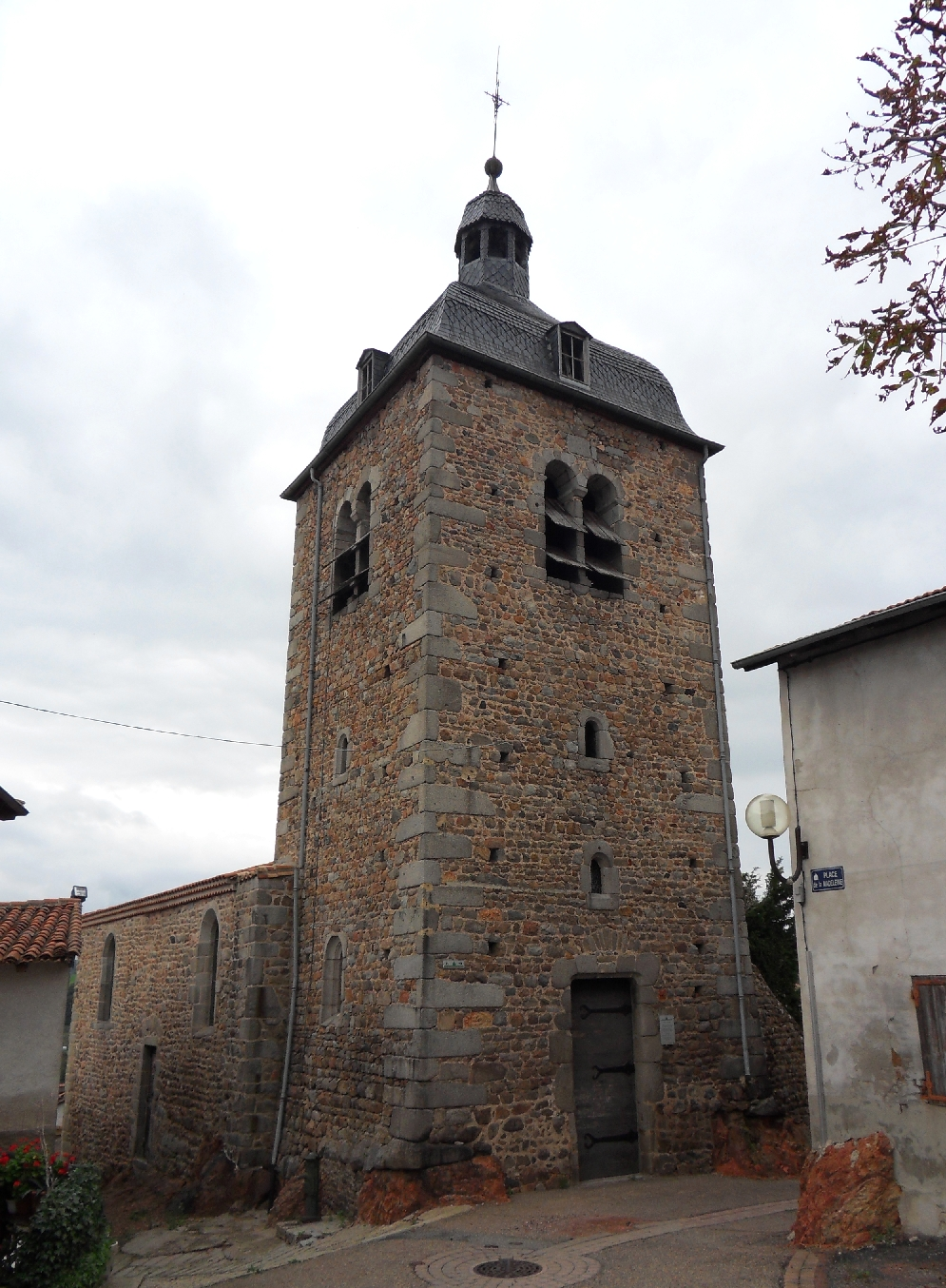

- Coat of arms
- Location of Saint-Germain-Laval
- Location within France Location within Auvergne-Rhône-Alpes
- Coordinates: 45°49′51″N 4°00′48″E
- Country: France
- Region: Auvergne-Rhône-Alpes
- Department: Loire
- Arrondissement: Roanne
- Canton: Boën-sur-Lignon
- Intercommunality: Vals d'Aix et d'Isable

Government
  - Mayor (2020–2026): Jean-Claude Raymond
- Area^{1}: 17.08 km^{2} (6.59 sq mi)
- Elevation: 430 m (1,410 ft)
- Highest elevation: 526 m (1,726 ft)
- Lowest elevation: 344 m (1,129 ft)
- Population (2023): 1,608
  - Density: 94.15/km^{2} (243.8/sq mi)
- Time zone: UTC+01:00 (CET)
  - Summer (DST): UTC+02:00 (CEST)
- INSEE/Postal code: 42230 /42260
- ^{1} French Land Register data, which excludes lakes, ponds, glaciers > 1 km^{2} (0.386 sq mi or 247 acres) and river estuaries.

Saint-Germain-Laval (French pronunciation: [sɛ̃ ʒɛʁmɛ̃ laval]; Arpitan: Sant-Gèrman-la-Vâr) is a commune in the Loire department in central France.

The North American explorer Daniel Greysolon, Sieur du Lhut was born in Saint-Germain-Laval.

== Geography ==
The commune is located in the plain of Forez, in the center of departement of Loire, in the center of France, 35 kilometers south of Roanne, 52 kilometers north-west of Saint-Etienne and 37 kilometers east of Thiers.

It is crossed by the Aix river, a tributary of the Loire which flows less than ten kilometers to the east. A The commune is 6 kilometers south of exit 5 of A89 autoroute linking Clermont-Ferrand (Auvergne, 85 km distant) to Saint-Étienne (62 km distant).

== Population ==
Historical population
| Year | Pop. | ±% p.a. |
|---|---|---|
| 1968 | 1,721 | — |
| 1975 | 1,777 | +0.46% |
| 1982 | 1,657 | −0.99% |
| 1990 | 1,510 | −1.15% |
| 1999 | 1,488 | −0.16% |
| 2007 | 1,599 | +0.90% |
| 2012 | 1,661 | +0.76% |
| 2017 | 1,635 | −0.32% |
| 2023 | 1,608 | −0.28% |
Source: INSEE

== Twin towns ==
Saint-Germain-Laval is twinned with:

- San Germano, Italy

== See also ==
- Communes of the Loire department
- Daniel Greysolon, Sieur du Lhut (c. 1639 – 1710), born in Saint-Germain-Laval. He is the namesake of Duluth, Minnesota as well as Duluth, Georgia
