= Governor of New France =

The governor of New France was the viceroy of the King of France in North America. A French nobleman, he was appointed to govern the colonies of New France, which included Canada, Acadia and Louisiana. The residence of the Governor was at the Chateau St. Louis in the capital of Quebec City. Acadia, Louisiana, and the towns of Trois-Rivières and Montreal had their own particular governors.

Prior to the establishment of the 1663 Sovereign Council, the highest positions in New France were that of Governor and Lieutenant-General, which were often held by the same person. The Governor then had responsibilities over both military and civil affairs in the colonies.

With the new royal administration of 1663, the title of governor general was given to the person responsible for the military and diplomatic relations. The duties of administration of justice, police and finance were given to the Intendant, who presided over the Sovereign Council. The Governor General answered to the French Secretary of State of the Navy and the Controller General of Finance.

Beginning with Charles de Montmagny, First Nations referred to the Governor as Onontio, meaning 'Great Mountain'. Each Onontio was the head of the Franco-Indian alliance.

== List of governors ==
Office Holder	Term	Appointed by
Cardinal Richelieu	1627–1632	Louis XIII
Samuel de Champlain	1632–1635	Louis XIII
Charles de Montmagny	1635–1648	Louis XIII
Louis d'Ailleboust de Coulonge	1648–1651	Louis XIV
Jean de Lauson	1651–1657	Louis XIV
Pierre de Voyer d'Argenson, Vicomte de Mouzay	1657–1661	Louis XIV
Pierre Dubois Davaugour	1661–1663	Louis XIV

== See also ==
- List of governors general of Canada#Governors of New France, 1627–1663
- Governor General of New France
- Governor of Montreal
- Governor of Acadia
- Governor of Plaisance
- Governor of Louisiana
- List of seignories of Quebec

Preceded by Lieutenant General of New France	Governor of New France; 1627–1663	Succeeded by Governor General of New France
