= Augustin de Saffray de Mésy =

Governor General of New France

Augustin de Saffray de Mézy
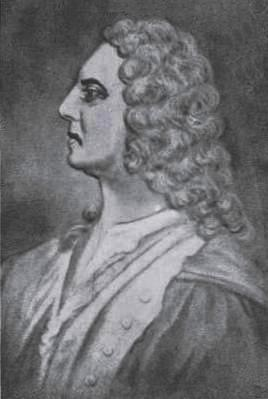
- Born: c. 1598; Normandy, France
- Died: 6 May 1665 (aged 66–67); Quebec, New France

Governor General of New France
- In office 15 September 1663 – 6 May 1665
- Preceded by: Pierre du Bois d'Avaugour
- Succeeded by: Daniel de Rémy de Courcelle
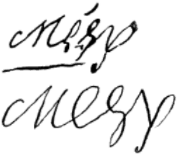
- Signature

Augustin de Saffray de Mézy or Mésy (French pronunciation: [oɡystɛ̃ də safʁɛ də mezi]; c. 1598 – 6 May 1665) was Governor General of New France from 15 September 1663 to 6 May 1665. He was the first to hold the post after Louis XIV of France took over the control of the colony from the Company of 100 Associates. His term was marked by the establishment of the Sovereign Council and conflict with Bishop François de Laval. Mézy died in office at Quebec on 6 May 1665.

== Early life ==
Mézy came from a family of minor Norman nobility. His parents were Anne Thiboust and Odet de Saffray, seigneur of Mézy, Vimont and Escoville. He served as the town-major of Caen before retiring to the hermitage of Caen as a disciple of Jean de Bernières. It was there that Mézy became known to Laval, who was later appointed vicar apostolic of New France in 1658.

== Governor General of New France ==
In 1663, Louis XIV declared New France a royal province and took control of the colony away from the Company of 100 Associates. The king recalled Pierre du Bois d'Avaugour as governor and tasked Laval, who had briefly returned to France, with finding a replacement. Laval recommended Mézy for the position, writing that under Mézy "all abuses which had brought him [Laval] to France would disappear from Canada." Mézy was reluctant to accept until the king offered to pay his debts in exchange for a three-year term. Mézy and Laval arrived at Quebec on 15 September 1663 after three months of sea. During the voyage, 60 of the 219 indentured labourers and settlers that had sailed with Mézy and Laval died from disease.

Shortly after his arrival Ursuline nun Marie de l'Incarnation wrote that Mézy "is a very pious and upright gentleman from Normandy, an intimate friend of the late Monsieur de Bernièles, who in his lifetime did not a little to win him to God."

Tasked with forming the first Sovereign Council upon his arrival, Mézy relied on Laval's recommendations and appointed five councillors and an attorney general. One of the Sovereign Council's first edicts was banning the trading of brandy to Indigenous people. The council eliminated the tax on imported goods from France, except for wine, brandy and tobacco. Surplus wheat was purchased and stored in anticipation of the promised arrival of a regiment of soldiers. The council also fixed the wages of indentured servants at 60 to 90 livres per year.

Mézy officially appointed Pierre Bourcher as governor of Trois-Rivières and Paul de Chomedey de Maisonneuve as governor of Montreal. Maisonneuve objected, arguing that since the Sulpicians held the seigneurial rights, only they could appoint a governor. For the same reason, Maisonneuve objected to the establishment of a royal court at Montreal.

Cooperation between governor general and bishop continued for a number of months but Mézy began to feel that Laval was treating him as an underling even though the governor general was the king's representative. Mézy informed Laval of his intention to expel three of Laval's proteges from the Sovereign Council, and to hold elections to replace them. Laval refused to cooperate but the three were still suspended due to the support of other council members.

Mézy served as governor general during a brief period of peace between the Iroquois and New France. The raids that had plagued the colony for more than a decade had abated due to a smallpox epidemic and conflict with the Susquehannock, Odawa and Abenaki. In the spring of 1664, Mézy and Laval met with an Onondaga delegation at Montreal, however, the French mistrusted the Iroquois's sincerity since raids in 1661 by the Mohawk, Oneida and Onondaga had killed 39 colonists and captured 61. Although the Onondaga had ceased their attacks against New France, the Mohawk had continued staging small-scale raids against Montreal in 1662 and 1663.

Arguments over the appointment of members of the Sovereign Council continued. In September 1664, Mezy expelled four members of the Council, including Jean Bourdon, the attorney general. When Bourdon refused to vacate his seat, Mesy attacked him with his cane and sword. Laval condemned Mézy's behavior from the puplit, while the governor general distributed notices defending his actions.

== Death ==
Mézy became seriously ill in March 1665. During his illness he confessed, received communion, and was reconciled with the Church. When he died on 5 May 1665 he was unaware that in France complaints against him had been levied by Bourdon and another former councillor. Mezy was ordered recalled, and his replacement, Daniel de Rémy de Courcelle was tasked with investigating the charges levelled against Mézy, and if warranted, send him to France for trial.

== Notes ==
Government offices
Preceded by Pierre du Bois d'Avaugour; Governor of New France	Governor General of New France; 1663–1665	Succeeded by Daniel de Rémy de Courcelle
