= Governor General of New France =

Vice-regal post of French North America from 1663 to 1760

Governor General of New France was the vice-regal post in New France from 1663 until 1760 and the last French vice-regal post. It replaced the post of Governor of New France, and was replaced by the British post of Governor of the Province of Quebec following the fall of New France.

In 1663, New France was reformed to be under the rule of a Governor General. This was a nobleman serving as the king's personal representative, with power to command troops and oversee diplomacy. Domestic power was delegated to the Sovereign Council of New France, which the Governor General chaired, and to the Intendant of New France, a civil administrator.

While the districts of Montreal and Trois-Rivières had their own governors, the Governor of the District of Quebec City and the Governor General of New France were the same person.

== List ==
Picture	Governor general (Birth–Death)	From	Until	Appointed by
	Augustin de Saffray de Mésy (1588–1665)	1663	1665	Louis XIV (1638–1715)
	Daniel de Rémy de Courcelle (1626–1698)	1665	1672	Louis XIV (1638–1715)
	Louis de Buade de Frontenac (1622–1698)	1672	1682	Louis XIV (1638–1715)
	Antoine Lefèbvre de La Barre (1622–1688)	1682	1685	Louis XIV (1638–1715)
	Jacques-René de Brisay, Marquis de Denonville (1637–1710)	1685	1689	Louis XIV (1638–1715)
	Louis de Buade de Frontenac (1622–1698)	1689	1698	Louis XIV (1638–1715)
	Louis-Hector de Callière (1648–1703)	1698	1703	Louis XIV (1638–1715)
	Philippe de Rigaud Vaudreuil (c. 1643–1725)	1703	1725	Louis XIV (1638–1715)
	Charles de la Boische, Marquis de Beauharnois (1671–1749)	1725	1746	Louis XV (1710–1774)
	Roland-Michel Barrin de La Galissonière (1693–1756)	1747	1749	Louis XV (1710–1774)
	Jacques-Pierre de Taffanel de la Jonquière, Marquis de la Jonquière (1685–1752)	1749	1752	Louis XV (1710–1774)
	Michel-Ange Duquesne de Menneville (c. 1700–1778)	1752	1755	Louis XV (1710–1774)
	Pierre de Rigaud, Marquis de Vaudreuil-Cavagnial (1698–1778)	1755	1760	Louis XV (1710–1774)

== See also ==
- Governor of Montreal
- Governor of Acadia
- Governor of Plaisance
- Governors of French Louisiana

Preceded by Governor of New France	Governor General of New France; 1663–1760	Succeeded by Governor of the Province of Quebec
