= Louis-Armand de Lom d'Arce de Lahontan, Baron de Lahontan =

French soldier in Canada

Louis-Armand de Lom d'Arce de Lahontan
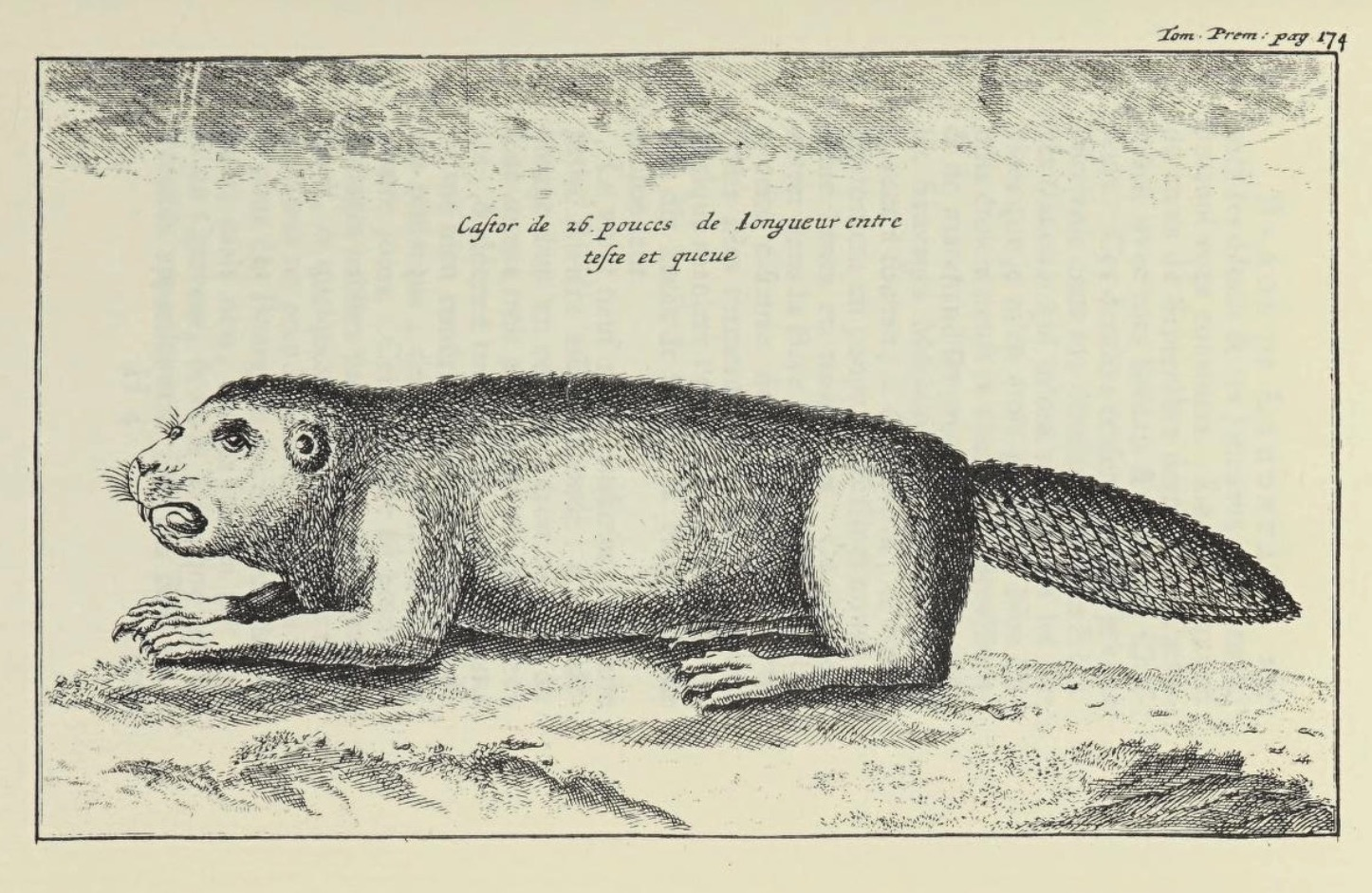
- Beaver illustration from Nouveaux Voyages. "These animals seem to be communicating and reasoning with each other through certain plaintive, inarticulate tones."
- Born: 9 June 1666
- Died: Before 1716
- Occupations: Soldier, explorer, writer

Louis Armand, Baron de Lahontan (9 June 1666 – before 1716) was a French aristocrat, writer, and explorer who served in the French military in Canada, where he traveled extensively in the Wisconsin and Minnesota region and the upper Mississippi Valley. Upon his return to Europe he wrote an enormously popular travelogue. In it he recounted his voyage up the "Long River," now thought to be the Missouri. He wrote at length and in very positive terms about Native American culture, portraying Indian people as free, rational, and generally admirable.

== Early life ==
Louis Armand was born into the aristocracy and inherited the title Baron Lahontan upon his father's death in 1674. De Lahontan joined the troupes de la marine and was sent to New France in 1683 at age 17 along with two other officers and three companies of troops. After arriving at Quebec in November and settling in Beaupré, he would lead his company in 1684 on an unsuccessful offensive against the Iroquois from Fort Frontenac.

== Explorer ==
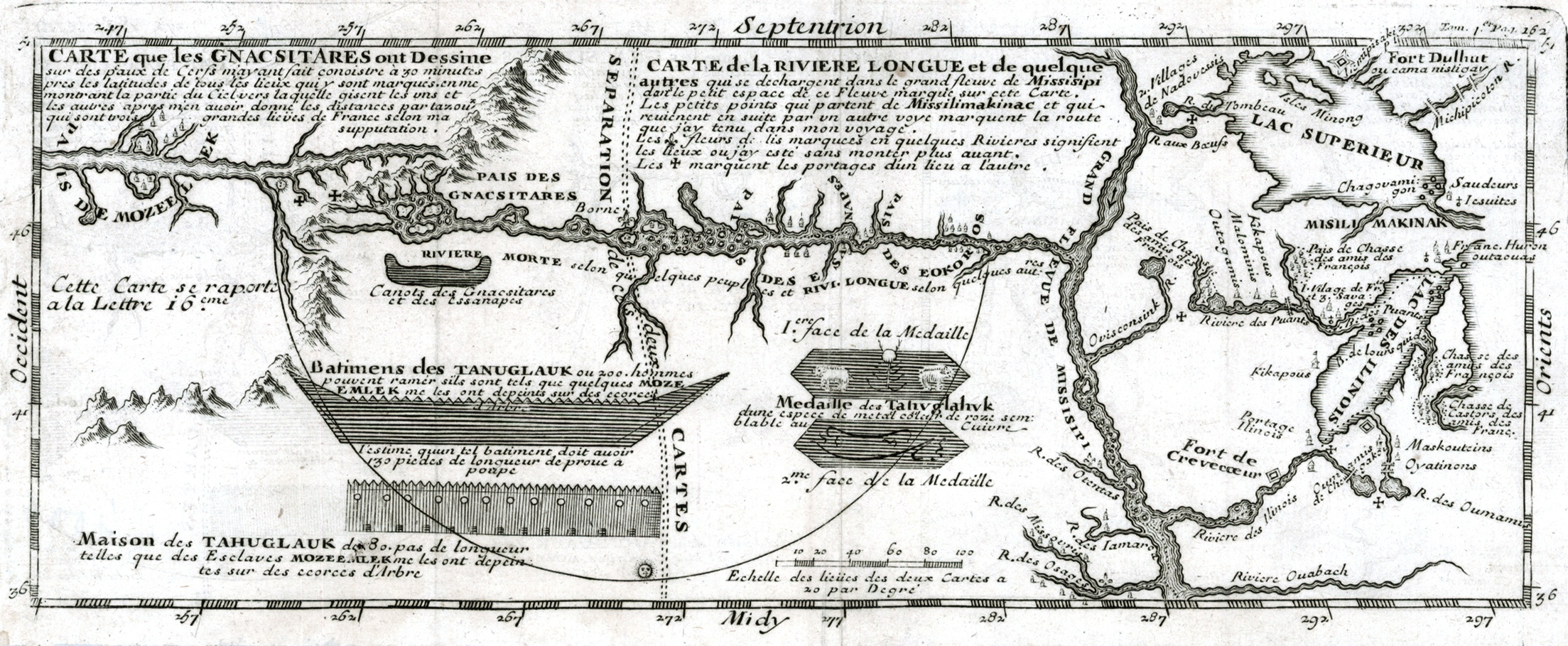
Map depicting Baron de Lahontan's west-east Long River (Riviere Longue), rising in distant western mountains and emptying into the upper Mississippi.

Having already faced the reality of settler life in Beaupré, de Lahontan again led his men to Boucherville to live with local inhabitants between 1685 and 1687, dividing his time between hunting and classical literature. Just prior to a decision to return to France, Lahontan was ordered–at least in part because of his knowledge of the Algonquian language–to head a detachment of French and native troops towards Fort St. Joseph where he would launch another attack on the Iroquois. He was a restless commander and spent much of his time exploring the region. In 1688, following news of the abandonment of the post at Niagara and renewed attacks of the Iroquois, he burned his fort and led his men to Michillimackinac in search of supplies and possibly entertainment for his men. De Lahontan felt that without supplies from Niagara his dwindling stores would not be enough to last the winter. During the winter and spring months he explored the upper Mississippi valley where he ascended the “Rivière Longue”; some scholars consider this a fanciful tale, others argue that he had discovered the Missouri River.

== King William's War ==
During King William's War, De Lahontan submitted several proposals for military fortification and equipment in New France, such as a Great Lakes flotilla for defense against the Iroquois and a line of forts meant for defense along the western frontier, both on behalf of Governor Frontenac in 1692. Further, he led a successful offensive against five English frigates of Phipp's invasion fleet in the Gulf of St. Lawrence in 1690 under Frontenac. Though his proposal for a Great Lakes flotilla was ultimately rejected on the basis of cost, de Lahontan would be promoted to King's Lieutenant.

At Placentia, Newfoundland, he defended the capital from a siege in 1692. On 13 December 1692, following a conflict with the governor of Placentia, Jacques-François de Monbeton de Brouillan, de Lahontan decided to abandon his office and New France altogether.

He deserted and took ship for Viana, Portugal. Deprived of his inheritance and unable to return to France, he eventually arrived in Amsterdam on 14 April. During an unknown period of time in Zaragoza, Spain, until at least 1696, de Lahontan recorded his memoirs for the English government explaining how and why they should take French-controlled Canada.

== Author ==
Upon return to Amsterdam in 1703, he published his three most famous works: Nouveaux Voyages dans l’Amerique Septentrionale, Memoires de l’Amerique Septentrionale, and Supplement aux Voyages ou Dialogues avec le sauvage Adario. Nouveaux Voyages dans l’Amerique Septentrionale provides a thorough and detailed account of de Lahontan's life and stay in New France, while Memoires de l’Amerique Septentrionale describes his observations of geography, institutions, commerce as well as information about native tribes. Finally, Supplement aux Voyages ou Dialogues avec le sauvage Adario lambasts institutional Christianity by means of a dialogue between de Lahontan and Kondiaronk, a Huron Chief who is referred to as Adario (The Rat) in the text. The author attempts to contrast the injustice of Christianity with the freedom and justice of native people. This book was widely read, and played a role in the growing demand for more equality between rich and poor in France.

== Legacy ==
A number of geographic features in Nevada's Carson and Humboldt River basins are named Lahontan in his honor, including the Lahontan Valley and the prehistoric lake it once held, Lake Lahontan. Additional features in the region are in turn named for the ancient lake, including the Lahontan Reservoir and the Lahontan cutthroat trout, a fish native to Nevada.

Lahontan's New Voyages to North America is analyzed at length in the 2021 book The Dawn of Everything by David Graeber and David Wengrow.

== See also ==
- New Voyages to North America

== Links ==
- Lahontan, Baron (1703). New Voyages to North America. Vol. 1. London: H. Bonwicke et al.
- Lom d'Arce at the Canadian Museum of History: CV, animated map of his expedition to Saint-Louis; English or French
