= Daniel Greysolon, Sieur du Lhut =

French explorer (c. 1639–1710)

- Born: 1639; Saint-Germain-Laval, Forez, Kingdom of France
- Died: February 25, 1710 (aged 70–71); Montreal, New France
- Occupations: soldier, explorer,
- Known for: being the namesake for the city of Duluth

Daniel Greysolon, Sieur du Lhut (c. 1639 – 25 February 1710) was a French soldier and explorer who is the first European known to have visited the area where the city of Duluth, Minnesota, United States, is now located and the head of Lake Superior in Minnesota. His name is sometimes anglicized as "DuLuth", and he is the namesake of Duluth, Minnesota, as well as Duluth, Georgia. Daniel Greysolon signed himself "Dulhut" on surviving manuscripts.

== Early life ==
He was born about 1639 in Saint-Germain-Laval, near Saint-Étienne (then in Forez), France, and first visited New France in 1674.

== Exploration ==
In September 1678, Dulhut left Montreal for Lake Superior, spending the winter near Sault Sainte Marie and reaching the western end of the lake in the fall of the following year, where he concluded peace talks between the Anishinaabe (Saulteur) and Dakota (Sioux) peoples. On 2 July 1679, DuLhut planted the flag of France "in the great village of the Nadouecioux, called Izatys", a Dakota Mdewakanton town on what is now called Mille Lacs Lake. In June 1680, Duluth heard of the capture of a Catholic priest by the name of "Louis Henpin" (Louis Hennepin) who had been captured by other "Nadouecioux" (Sioux), among whom Duluth was living. After receiving word of his capture, Duluth set out at once to find the Franciscan priest and demand his release. Duluth bartered for the priest's freedom, but in so doing he broke laws banning trading with Natives without government approval, which ultimately led to troubles back in Montreal. Lured by native stories of the Western or Vermilion Sea (likely the Great Salt Lake in Utah), Duluth reached the Mississippi River via the Saint Croix River in 1680 and then headed back to Fort de Buade, where he heard that jealous Quebec merchants and the intendant Jacques Duchesneau de la Doussinière et d'Ambault were slandering him. He was forced to return to Montreal and then France in 1681 to defend himself against false accusations of treason, returning the following year.

Duluth subsequently established fur trading posts to further French interests at Lake Nipigon and Fort Caministigoyan at the mouth of the Kaministiquia River on Lake Superior, the site of the city of Thunder Bay, Ontario, probably 1684/85, not 1679 as many sources suggest, and at Fort St. Joseph (Port Huron) between Lake Erie and Lake Huron, which was garrisoned with 50 men.

== Death ==
He died of gout in Montreal on 25 February 1710, and was buried in the Recollet church.

== Legacy ==
Montreal has a Duluth Avenue (Avenue Duluth in French), named after Greysolon, located in "The Plateau" borough of the city (known as Le Plateau-Mont Royal in French). The avenue became quite popular with both residents and tourists after it was redesigned in the early 1980s. It was made to be more pedestrian-friendly with pleasantly-designed sidewalks, many trees, and flower boxes. It is said to have been modeled after Woonerf streets in the Netherlands and Belgium where pedestrians and cyclists have priority over motorized vehicles, which have a reduced speed limit.

Duluth, Minnesota, also has a road named after duLhut, Greysolon Road, stretching from the Endion to Congdon neighborhoods.

== In popular culture ==
Colder by the Lake, a theater company in Duluth, Minnesota, produced an original comic opera based on the life of Daniel Greysolon, entitled Les Uncomfortables (a play on the title of the musical Les Misérables), the music was composed by Tyler Kaiser and the libretto written by Margi Preus and Jean Sramek, all of Duluth. The work was performed in 2001, 2002, and 2016.
