= Troilus de Mesqouez =

Viceroy of New France (1578-1606)

Troilus de Mesgouez (1536–1606) was a French noble (Marquis de La Roche-Helgomarche) and served as Viceroy of New France. He initiated the first attempts to settle Sable Island, a small island off what is today the Canadian province of Nova Scotia.

== Biography ==
Troilus de Mesgouez was born in Mesgouez en Ploumoguer to parents Guillaume de Mesgouez and Françoise Campir. He was granted the title of Viceroy of New France in 1578 by Henry III of France and around 1598 or 1599 sent settlers (mainly criminals) and soldiers to Sable Island to establish a fishery and fur trading post. Poorly planned, the settlement failed and was abandoned around 1602–1603.

== Death ==
After returning from Sable Island he tried without success to obtain his dues from Henry IV of France. He was married twice and left no heirs upon his death.

== Legacy ==
La Roche is a township in Bas-Saint-Laurent, Canada which was named for him some three centuries after his arrival in the area.

Government offices
| Preceded by Jean-François Roberval | Lieutenant General of New France; 1578–1598? | Succeeded by hiatus until 1602, then Aymar Chaste |
