= Pierre Dubois Davaugour =

Canadian politician

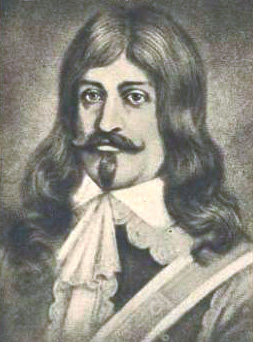
Pierre Dubois Davaugour

Baron Pierre Dubois Davaugour (French pronunciation: [pjɛʁ dybwa davoɡuʁ]; before 1620–1664) was the French soldier and Governor of New France from 1661 to 1663.

He was related to the old family who were counts and dukes of Penthièvre in Brittany. Davaugour was a career soldier (40 years) in the French Army and died while fighting against Turks in Serinvans-Zrin at a fortress (likely Zrin Castle) on the border with French ally and Habsburg controlled Kingdom of Croatia during the Austro-Turkish War.

Charles Augustin de Saffray de Mésy succeeded him as Governor of New France.

Government offices
Preceded by Vicomte d'Argenson	Governor of New France; 1661–1663	Succeeded by Augustin de Mésy as Governor General of New France
