= Elizabeth M. Boyer =

American lawyer

- Born: November 12, 1913; Lima, Ohio
- Died: December 2, 2002 (aged 89); Novelty, Ohio
- Occupation(s): lawyer, feminist and writer
- Known for: founder of WEAL

Elizabeth M. Boyer (November 12, 1913 in Ohio – December 2, 2002) was an American lawyer, feminist and writer.

In 1937, she earned a B.S. in education from Bowling Green State University. In 1947, she received her law degree from Cleveland State University College of Law. In 1950, she earned her Masters of Law degree from Case Western Reserve University School of Law. She was a full professor of business law at Cuyahoga Community College.

In 1968, she founded the Women's Equity Action League (WEAL) as a moderate feminist movement for professional women. It provided dissent against the pro-choice stance of the National Organization for Women (NOW).

Boyer also researched and wrote a number of books about historical women, including 16th-century noblewoman Marguerite de La Rocque, who was marooned on an island in the Gulf of St Lawrence as punishment for an affair.

Boyer headed her own publishing firm Veritie Press and was the author of three books. Boyer was a member of Delta Gamma.

== Bibliography ==
- Marguerite de la Roque: A Story of Survival. Novelty, Ohio: Veritie Press. 1975. ISBN 0-915964-01-5.
- Freydis and Gudrid. Novelty, Ohio: Veritie Press. 1976. ISBN 0-915964-02-3.
- A Colony of One: The History of a Brave Woman. Novelty, Ohio: Veritie Press. 1983. ISBN 0-915964-05-8.
