= Jean-François Roberval =

French privateer and governor (c. 1500–1560)

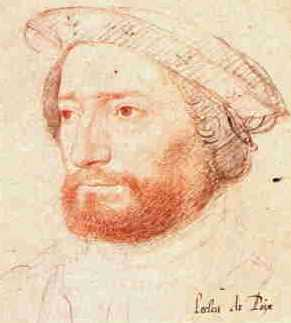
- Sketch of de La Rocque de Roberval by Jean Clouet, Chateau de Chantilly, France
- Born: Jean-François de La Rocque de Roberval c. 1500 near Carcassonne, France
- Died: 1560; Paris, France
- Other names: Roberval, Sieur de Roberval
- Occupations: French nobleman and pirate
- Known for: First lieutenant general of French Canada

Jean-François de La Rocque de Roberval (c. 1500 – 1560) was a French nobleman and adventurer who, through his friendship with King Francis I, became the first Lieutenant General of New France. As a corsair he attacked towns and shipping throughout the Spanish Main, from Cuba to Colombia. He died in Paris as one of the first Huguenot martyrs.

== Early life and soldiering ==
Roberval was born in Carcassonne, southern France. He was also associated with Roberval, Oise, in the north of the country.

As a young nobleman, Roberval joined the French Army in the Italian campaigns. He quickly developed a lifelong friendship with the future King Francis I, and in addition to soldiering together, they hunted on the Roberval estates. On return from the wars, he led the expensive life of a courtier, and borrowed heavily on his estates. This was a debt that would encourage his adventurism throughout his life.

== Attempt at colonizing Canada ==
On 15 January 1541, Francis I gave Roberval a commission to settle the province of Canada and provide for the spread of the "Holy Catholic faith". The King provided some funds for this expedition and three ships; Valentine, Anne and Lechefraye. Jacques Cartier, to whom the King had first given this commission on the basis of his previous two voyages to Canada, was hired as chief navigator. Roberval was not ready to go, but gave permission for Cartier to proceed to New France. Cartier did so in May 1541, and, with 500 colonists, built a fortified colony, Charlesbourg-Royal, near the Iroquois settlement of Stadacona.

In order to raise additional funds, Roberval went pirating with Bidoux de Lartigue, taking several English merchant ships. Despite his pleasure at tweaking the English, Francis I diplomatically kept the peace and rebuked Roberval.

Roberval with his three ships and 200 colonists set sail in April 1542, arriving on 8 June. Cartier, impatient to show the king the "gold and diamonds" he had found (which were nothing more than quartz and some iron pyrites, also known as "fool's gold"), was already on his way home from Charlesbourg-Royal. The ships met off the coast of Newfoundland and, despite Roberval's wishes, Cartier promptly left for France with his military detachment and some discouraged colonists. Having some good maps from Cartier, the Roberval team sailed easily up the Saint Lawrence River, to Charlesbourg-Royal, which Roberval renamed France-Roy. En route, he abandoned his near-relative Marguerite de La Rocque with her lover on the "Isle of Demons", off the coast of Quebec, as punishment for their affair. The young man, their servant and baby died, but Marguerite survived to be rescued by fishermen and returned to France. The settlement lasted less than two years due to the severe winter, scurvy, and attacks by the St. Lawrence Iroquoians, who had been displeased with the French in the recent past (since or before 1534), not least because of Cartier's treatment of the chief Donnacona. In 1543 a relief expedition arrived from France and Roberval decided to repatriate his little colony to France.

== Piracy in the Caribbean ==
Taking his disappointment at the failed Canadian venture and his ships, Roberval again went pirating, this time in the Caribbean against Spanish ships and towns, since France and Spain were at war. Known to the Spanish as Roberto Baal, in 1543 he attacked Rancherias and Santa Marta, followed by an attack in 1544 on Cartagena de Indias. In 1546 ships under his command attacked Baracoa and Havana. In 1547 he retired from pirating, and subsequently King Henry II appointed Roberval as the Royal Superintendent of Mines. Despite all of these ventures and royal favour he did not manage to reconstitute his fortune. By 1555, his goods were fully mortgaged and the Château de Roberval was threatened with seizure.

== Religion and death ==
Roberval was an early convert to Calvinism, that is, a French Protestant or Huguenot, and as such risked persecution from the Catholic Church. In 1535 he escaped hanging as a Protestant only by the intervention of the King. In his management of the Canadian expedition he showed a very Calvinistic severity. He was assassinated in 1560 in Paris along with fellow Protestants after leaving a Calvinist meeting near the Cimetière des Innocents.

== In literature ==
Rabelais spoke of him as Robert Valbringue. His marooning of Marguerite de la Roque de Roberval, his young relative, and her rescue, is recounted in novella 67 of the Heptaméron (1559) by Queen Marguerite of Navarre. André Thevet wrote on Jean-François de Roberval, including two versions of the legend of Marguerite de Roberval in Cosmographie universelle and Le Grand Insulaire et pilotage.

Court poets Clément Marot and Michel d'Amboise dedicated works to him. A Protestant poem in Latin, "Robervalensis Epitaphium", is part of an anonymous collection of poems at the National Library in Paris. According to the dedication to Henry of Navarre by François Desprez, some of the costume woodcuts in Richard Breton's Recueil des Habits (Paris 1562) derive from Roberval's sketches.

Allegra Goodman re-imagined the life of Marguerite de la Roque in her 2025 novel, Isola.

== Place name ==
The city of Roberval, Quebec is named after him.

== See also ==
- Académie de Roberval

== References and notes ==
This article is based in part on material from the French Wikipedia.

Government offices
Preceded by none	Lieutenant General of New France; 1541–1543	Succeeded by hiatus until 1598, then Troilus de la Roche de Mesgouez, Marquis de la Roche-Mesgouez
