= Jean de Bernieres-Louvigny =

French mystic (1602–1659)

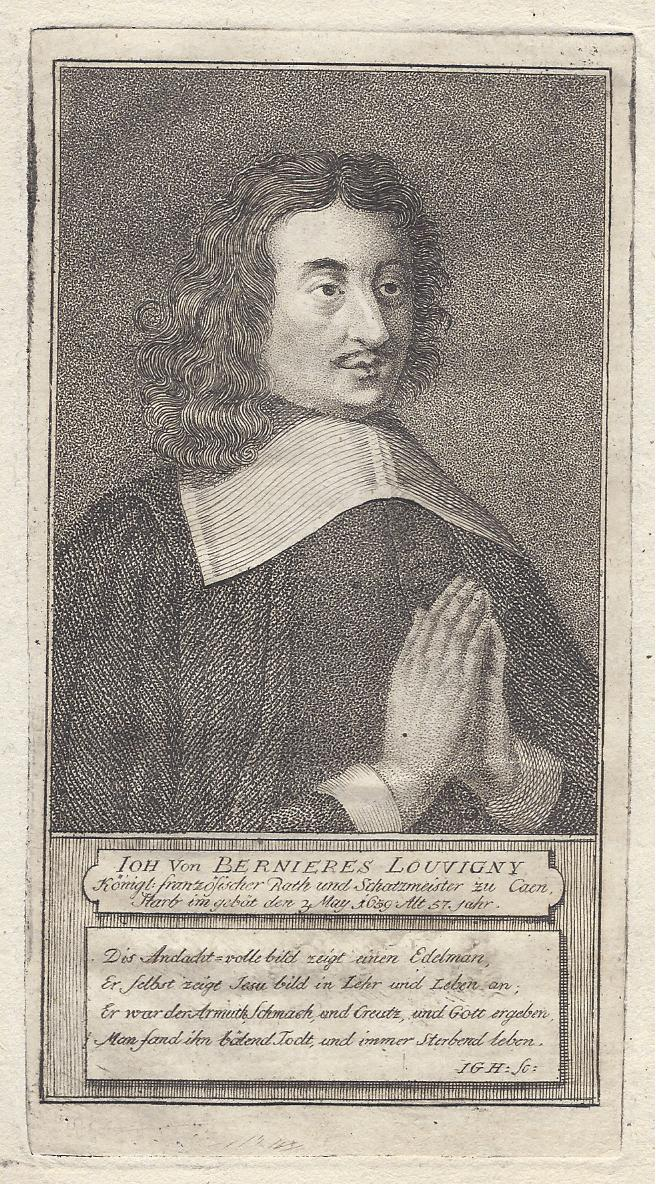
Jean de Bernieres-Louvigny

Jean de Bernieres-Louvigny (1602 – 3 May 1659) was a French mystic and an important lay spiritual writer.

== Life ==
Jean de Bernieres-Louvigny was born in the city of Caen, Normandy in 1602 and he worked as a Royal finance officer. After a conversion experience, he began to live in a hermitage as an ascetic. He was never a cleric, but devoted himself to the spiritual leadership of many people, and also wrote some sacred works, which were not printed until after his death. He led a contemplative, but also a charitable life. He died in his hometown on May 3, 1659.

The German mystic of the reformed Pietism school, Gerhard Tersteegen (1697-1769) translated his works into German in 1727 for the first time.

== Quotes ==
If a pure love is found on Earth, she finds herself in the heart, which loves its humiliation. Jean de Bernieres-Louvigny - "The inner Christ"

The virtues shown through external works are very easy to practice, because this happens in front of the people and is easy from our side and brings the applause of others; but the virtues, which consist only in suffering lead to large difficulties because it brings shame and ridicule. Be patient, and do not give up. Jean de Bernieres-Louvigny - "The Inner Christ"

== Works ==
Some German translations of his writings:

- Das verborgene Leben mit Christo in Gott, (Hidden life with Christ in God) Reutlingen, 1835.
- Der innere Christ, (The inner Christ), Publisher Verlag G. J. Manz, Regensburg, 1837.
- Johannes Burkardt: Gerhard Tersteegen. Die Bernières-Louvigny-Übersetzungen. (=Siegener Beiträge zur Reformierten Theologie und Pietismusforschung Bd. 5). Luther-Verlag, Bielefeld 2023.

== Literature ==
Johannes B. Zwerger, "Apis ascetica", Johannes v. Berniéres Louvigny Aphorisms 1-65, published by Franz Frhrn. v. OER, Graz, 1894.
