= Pierre de Voyer d'Argenson, Vicomte de Mouzay =

Canadian politician

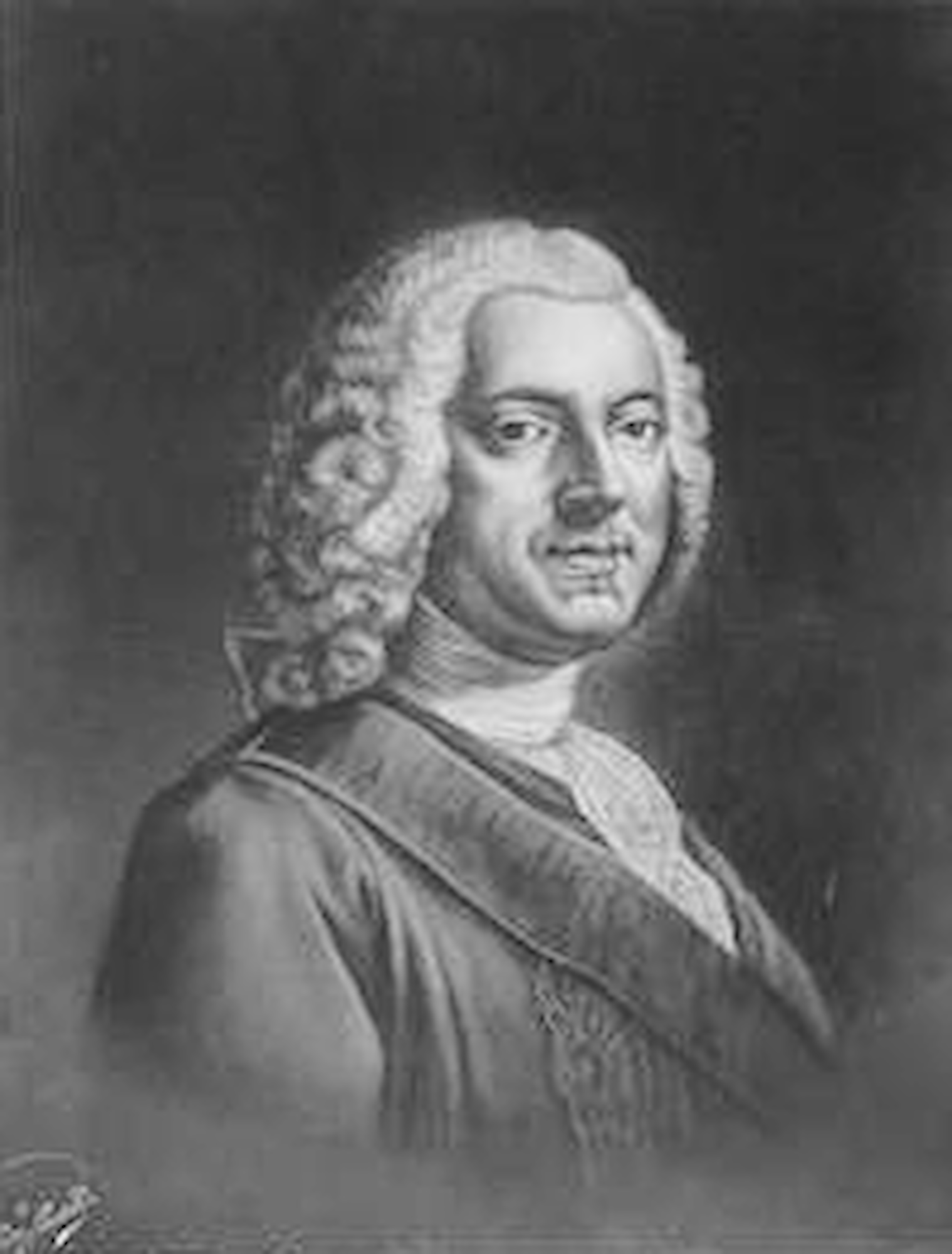

Governor of New France
- In office 1658–1661

Pierre de Voyer d'Argenson, Vicomte de Mouzay (c. 1625 – probably in 1709) was the French governor of New France from 1658 to 1661.

== Biography ==
He was a son of the diplomat René de Voyer de Paulmy d'Argenson. He came of a noble family of Touraine, and although originally intended for the church, distinguished himself in several military engagements. He received his commission as governor of Canada on 27 January 1657, arriving in Quebec in 1658. Under his administration, Canada was occupied in repelling incursions from the Iroquois, and was torn by internal quarrels. He made some progress in exploring the region on Hudson Bay and beyond Lake Superior.

== Notes ==
Government offices
Preceded by Jean de Lauson	Governor of New France; 1658–1661	Succeeded by Le Baron d'Avaugour
