= Bacqueville de la Potherie =

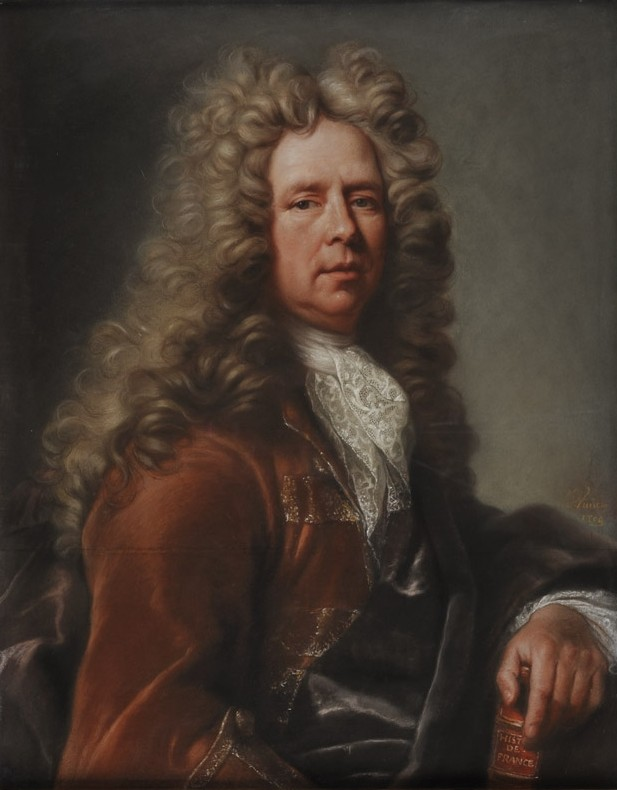
Portrait by Joseph Vivien, 1704

Bacqueville de la Potherie, also known as Claude-Charles Le Roy, was a French chronicler of New France.

His most famous work is Histoire de I'Amérique septentrionale, an account of French expeditions to the Great Lakes and Mississippi region in the late 17th century. This book was written in 1702 but not published until 1722.
