= Onontio =

Native American title for the Governor of New France

Onontio was a title used by North American Indians of the Great Lakes region to refer to the governor of New France. The title was first given to Charles de Montmagny and was subsequently applied to all later French governors. Onontio is a Mohawk rendering of "great mountain", the folk etymology translation of "Montmagny". Each Onontio was the head of the Franco-Indian alliance, and as such was expected to mediate quarrels, provide supplies, and, in general, maintain the alliance. The title was used by both Iroquoian- and Algonquian-speaking natives, who addressed Onontio as "Father".

Onontio fell from power in 1763 with the conquest of New France by the British empire in the Seven Years' War. The British conquerors seemed unwilling or unable to fulfill the role of Onontio, which was, as a father, that of a mediator and provider rather than a conqueror. As a result, the natives of the Great Lakes rose up against British rule in Pontiac's Rebellion, attempting in part to restore Onontio to power. The native war effort was a failure militarily, but the British revised their policies and began to fulfill some of Onontio's duties. The new Anglo-Indian alliance proved beneficial to the British Empire in subsequent decades as the British were able to enlist native allies in struggles against the United States.

== See also ==
- Western Confederacy — Confederacy of Onontio's "children" formed after the American Revolution
- Covenant Chain — the Anglo-Iroquois relationship
