= Fort St. Joseph (Port Huron) =

Coordinates: 43.00193°N 82.42758°W

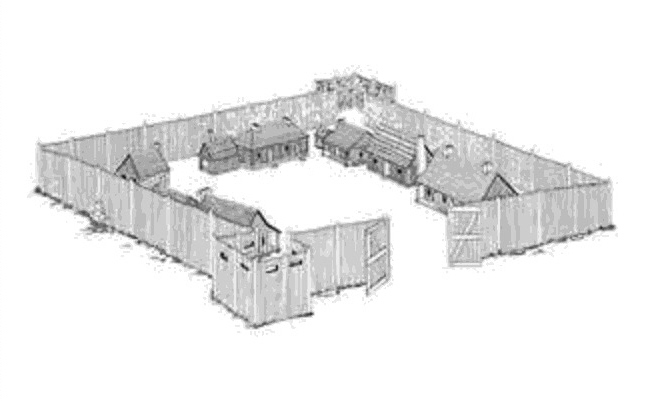
Fort St. Joseph

Fort St. Joseph was a fort established in 1686 by Daniel Greysolon, Sieur du Lhut for New France. Erected on the St. Clair River, the fort was intended to prevent English trade with native tribes. In 1687, about two hundred coureurs de bois, five hundred Algonquian, Henri de Tonti, Nicholas Perrot, Oliver Morel de La Durantaye, and thirty French soldiers gathered there under Marquis de Denonville's orders to prepare for an attack on the Six Nations Iroquois Confederacy during the Iroquois Wars.

With a lack of supplies and no orders from the governor, the fort's commander, Louis-Armand de Lom d'Arce de Lahontan, Baron de Lahontan, burned Fort St. Joseph on August 27, 1688, and moved to Michilimackinac. According to historian Reuben Gold Thwaites, the action caused "no disadvantage" to New France.
