= Daniel de Rémy de Courcelle =

Canadian politician

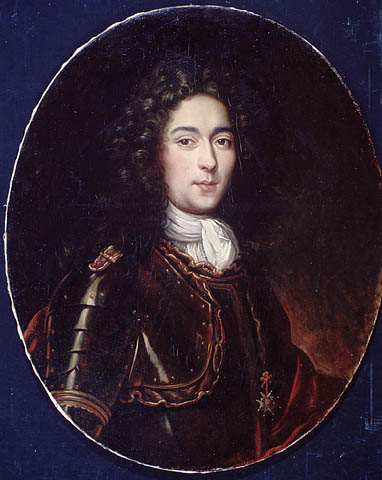

Governor General of New France
- In office 1665–1672

Personal details
- Born: 1626 Arques-la-Bataille, Province of Normandy, France
- Died: 24 October 1698 (aged 71–72) possibly Toulon, France

Daniel de Rémy de Courcelle, Sieur de Montigny, de La Fresnaye et de Courcelle (1626 – 24 October 1698) was the Governor General of New France from 1665 to 1672.

For many years the small French settlements on the north shore of the St. Lawrence River had been the subject of frequent raids by the Mohawk, one of the five nations that comprised the Haudenosaunee Confederacy. By the early 1660s, the colony was on the verge of collapse. After receiving numerous pleas for help, King Louis XIV of France took several steps to ensure the survival of New France. Daniel de Rémy de Courcelle was named as Governor, Jean Talon as Intendant, and the Carignan-Salières Regiment was sent to New France.

For the first two years of his administration, however, Courcelle was subordinate to Alexandre de Prouville de Tracy who had been appointed Lieutenant Général of the Americas by Louis XIV and specifically tasked with ending the threat of the Haudenosaunee. Courcelle arrived in New France in September 1665 and "breathing nothing but war" immediately involved himself with supervising the construction of forts along the Richelieu River, the main route used by the Mohawk in their raids on French settlements.

Tracy authorized Courcelle to lead an expedition of 500 regulars and volunteers against the Mohawk in the winter of 1666. The French soldiers, however, were ill-equipped to operate in the cold and deep snow. They were unaccustomed to using snowshoes, and many suffered from exhaustion, frostbite or hypothermia. Algonquin guides were to meet the expedition at Fort St. Louis, however, after waiting several weeks, Courcelle had set off without them. Without guides the expedition frequently lost their way, and provisions soon became scarce. The expedition eventually reached the Anglo-Dutch settlement of Schenectady where Courcelle was able to purchase supplies. While at Schenectady, a French patrol skirmished with the Mohawk resulting in the deaths of one officer, five soldiers and one volunteer. Courcelle decided to abandon the invasion and return to the Richelieu River forts. The Jesuit Relations record that over 60 men died from hunger during the expedition, however, Captain Francois de Tapie de Monteil of the Poitou Regiment wrote in his journal that "we lost 400 men who dropped dead from cold."

Courcelle accompanied Tracy on a much more successful expedition against the Mohawk in the autumn of 1666 that destroyed four Mohawk villages. Peace settlements with all five Haudenosaunee nations were reached by July 1667.

Courcelle's main contributions to the colony during his tenure were the actions he took to maintain peace, resolve conflict between the Haudenosaunee and the Algonquin, sustain the fur trade, and raise "the prestige of the French in the eyes" of the Indigenous population. When a Seneca sachem was murdered in Montreal in 1669, the three soldiers responsible were quickly arrested, tried and hanged. When the fur trade was threatened by renewed hostility between the Haudenosaunee and the Algonquin, Courcelle mounted a show of force by ascending the St. Lawrence River to Lake Ontario with 56 volunteers and a large bateau, demonstrating that the French could attack the western Haudenosaunee as easily as they had attacked the Mohawk. Courcelle pressured the Odawa to bring their furs to Montreal instead of to the English at Albany or to Haudenosaunee middlemen. In 1669, following the orders of Louis XIV, Courcelle established militia companies in which all able-bodied men between the ages of 16 and 60 were drilled in the use of arms. This proved invaluable in later wars with the Haudenosaunee and English. Courcelle also encouraged the exploration of the Great Lakes watershed and beyond by La Salle, Nicholas Perrot, Louis Jolliet, Jacques Marquette, and Daumont de Saint-Lusson.

Courcelle asked to be recalled in 1671. He departed New France in November 1672, and was appointed commander of the citadel at Arras. Courcelle married Marie-Anne Dabancourt in 1675 and had at least two sons. He is reported to have been the governor of Toulon at the time of his death.

== Notes ==
Government offices
Preceded by Augustin de Mésy	Governor General of New France; 1665–1672	Succeeded by Louis de Buade de Frontenac
