= Lieutenant General of New France =

Lieutenant General of New France was the title of a French official who governed early New France (including the colonies of Canada and Acadia) from 1598 until 1627. Before 1598, the post was briefly occupied from 1541 to 1543. It was the first vice-regal post in what would later become Canada, and it was a precursor of the modern-day office of Governor General of Canada, the representative of King Charles III, Canada's king and head of state.

Most holders of the title never set foot in New France, except for Jean-François de la Rocque de Roberval and Pierre Dugua, Sieur de Mons. The others served in the post from the comfort of the Kingdom of France. The title was replaced in 1627 by the post of Governor of New France.

Office Holder	Term	Appointed by
Jean-François de la Rocque de Roberval	1541–1543	Francis I
vacant	1543–1598	during reigns of Francis I, Henry II, Francis II, Charles IX, and Henry III
Troilus de Mesqouez	1598–1603	Henry III
Pierre Dugua, Sieur de Mons	1603–1610	Henry IV
Charles de Bourbon, comte de Soissons	1611–1612	Louis XIII (Marie de' Medici in regency)
Henri II, Prince of Condé	1612–1616	Louis XIII (Marie de' Medici in regency)
Pons de Lauzière, Marquis de Thémines de Cardillac	1616–1620	Louis XIII (Marie de' Medici in regency)
Henri II, Prince of Condé	1620	Louis XIII
Henri de Montmorency, 4th Duke of Montmorency	1620–1625	Louis XIII
Henri de Lévis, 3rd Duke of Ventadour	1625–1626	Louis XIII
Cardinal Richelieu	1626–1627	Louis XIII

Preceded by none	Lieutenant General of New France; 1598–1627	Succeeded by Governor of New France
