= Timeline of New France history =

This is a list of the timelines for the history of northern New France beginning with the first exploration of North America by France through being part of the French colonial empire.

- Beginnings to 1533 - northern region (present day Canada)
- 1534 to 1607 - northern region (Canada)
- 1608 to 1662 - (Quebec region)
- 1663 to 1759 - (Quebec region)

== See also ==
- Acadia (New France) - northern region colony
- Canada (New France) - northern region colony
- Louisiana (New France) - southern region colony
- French colonization of the Americas
- French Colonial Empire
