= Jacques David =

Jacques David may refer to:

- Jacques-Louis David (1748–1825), French painter
- Jacques David (bishop) (1930–2018), French Roman Catholic bishop
- Jacques David (court clerk) (c. 1684–1726), court clerk in Montreal
