= Timeline of Quebec history =

This article presents a detailed timeline of Quebec history. Events taking place outside Quebec, for example in English Canada, the United States, Britain or France, may be included when they are considered to have had a significant impact on Quebec's history.

- 1533 and before
- 1534 to 1607
- 1608 to 1662
- 1663 to 1759
- 1760 to 1773
- 1774 to 1790
- 1791 to 1840
- 1841 to 1866
- 1867 to 1899
- 1900 to 1930
- 1931 to 1959
- 1960 to 1981
- 1982 to present

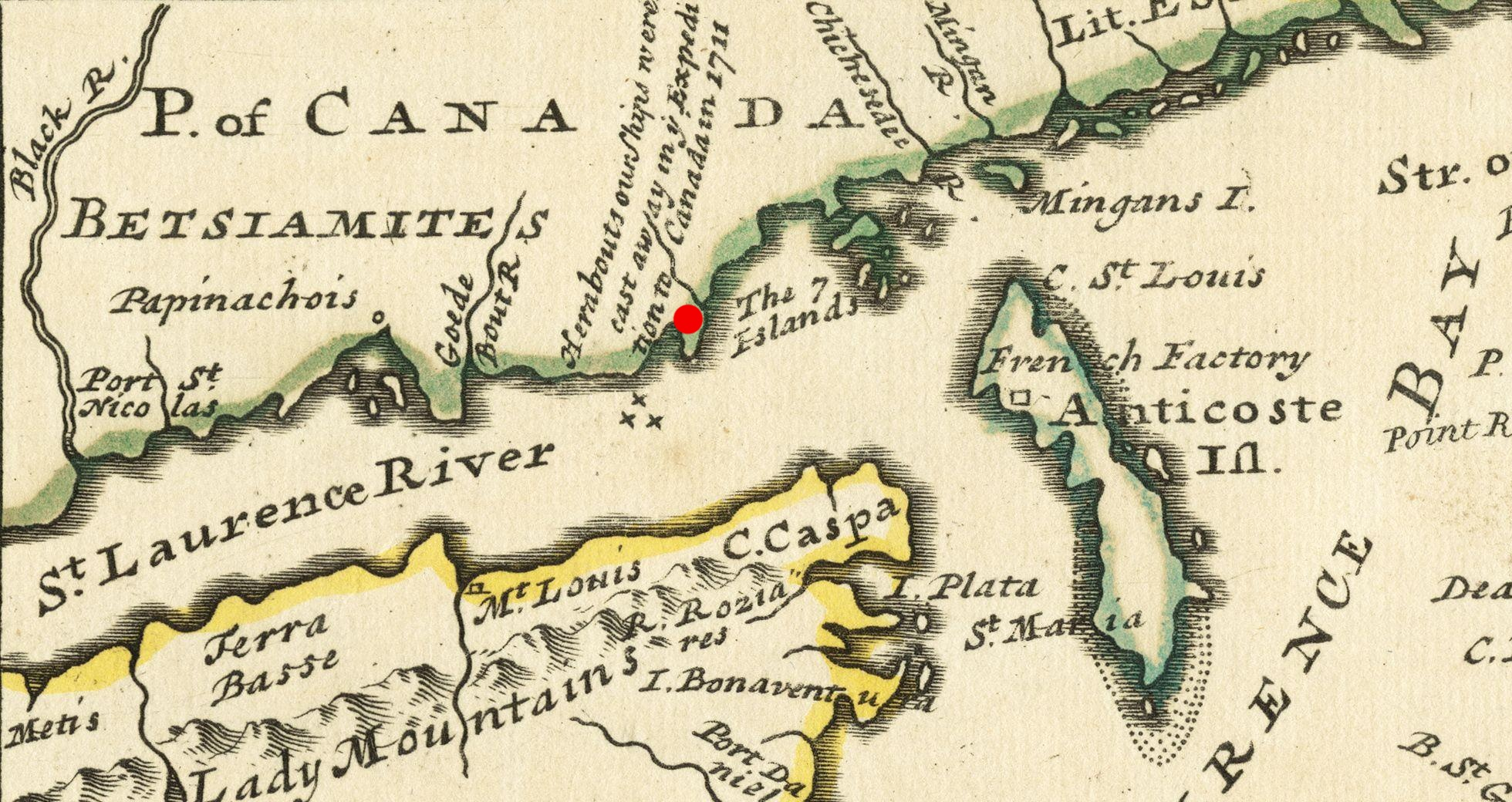
The approximate site of the disaster is marked in red on this 1733 map detail.

== See also ==
- List of Quebec general elections
- History of Quebec
- History of North America
- List of years in Canada
- List of Quebecers
- Quebec politics
- Timeline of Montreal history
- New France
