= Chemin du Roy =

Road in western Quebec

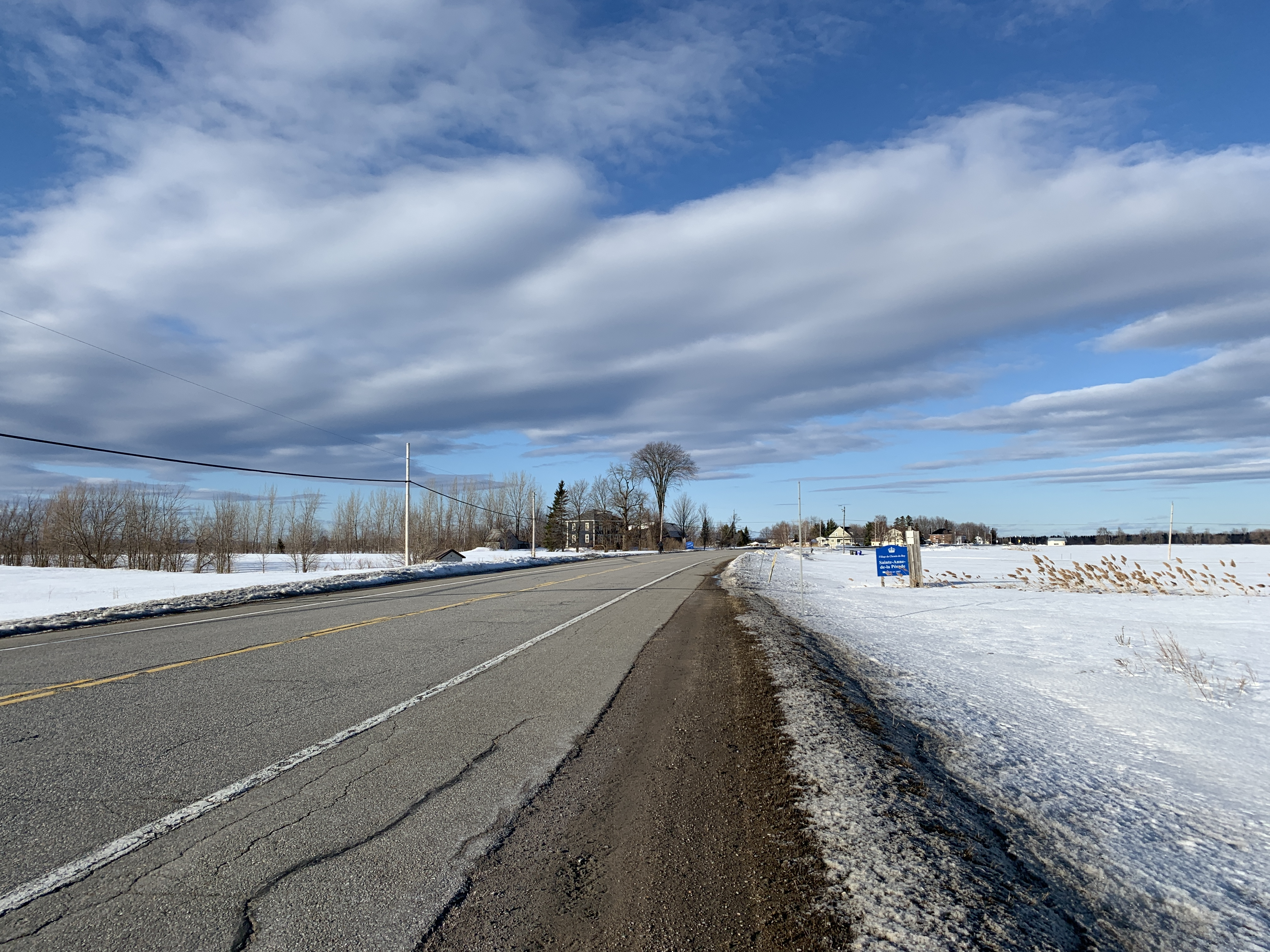
From Batiscan to Sainte-Anne-de-la-Pérade (Quebec Route 138)

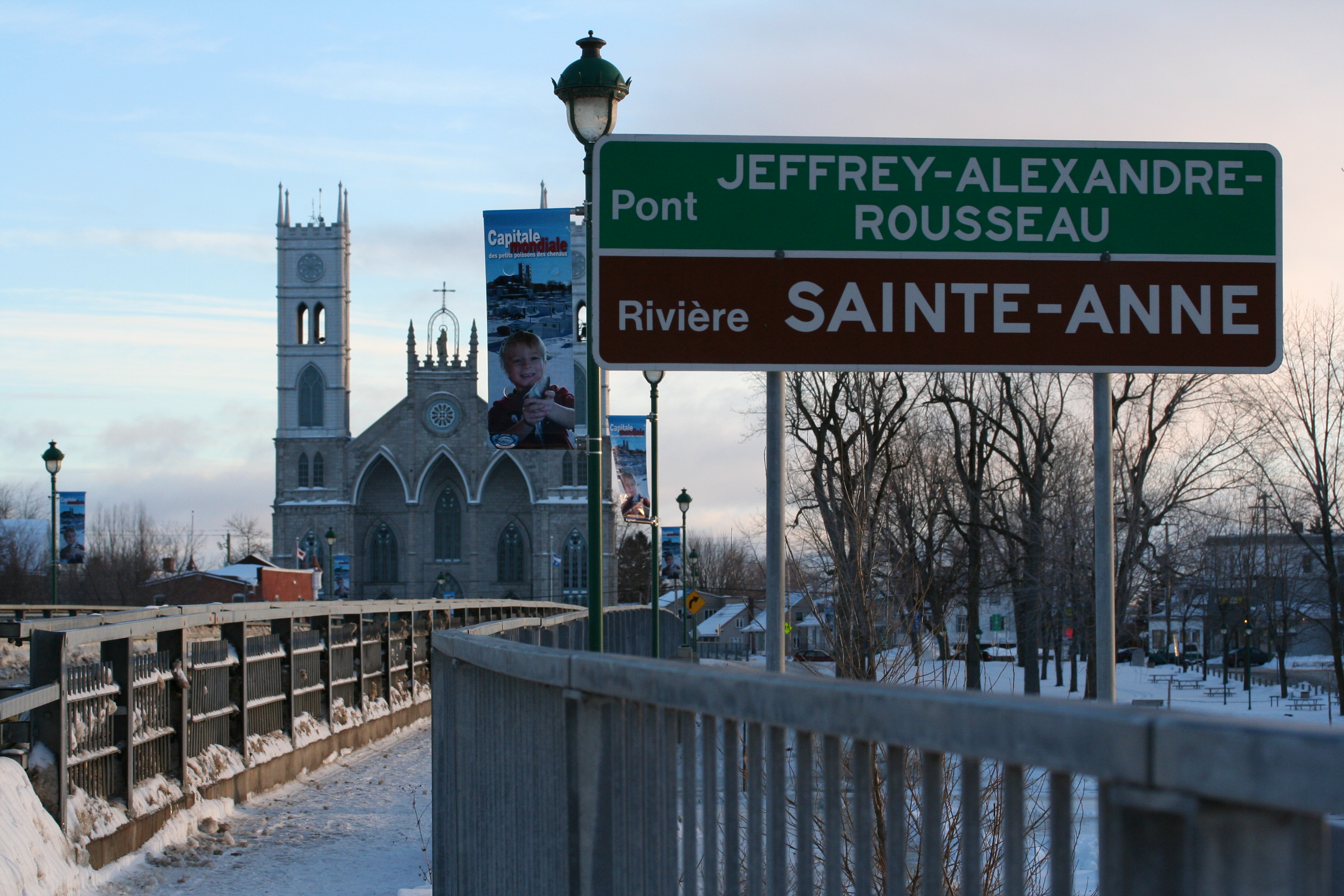
Jeffrey-Alexandre-Rousseau Bridge at Sainte-Anne-de-la-Pérade

The Chemin du Roy (Quebec French pronunciation: [ʃəmẽ d͡zʏ ʁwɑ]; French for "King's Highway" or "King's Road") is a historic road along the north shore of the St. Lawrence River in Quebec. The road begins in Repentigny and extends almost 280 kilometres (170 mi) eastward towards Quebec City, its eastern terminus. Most of the Chemin du Roy today follows along the present-day Quebec Route 138. The expressway that replaces both Route 138 and the Chemin du Roy through most of its course is Quebec Autoroute 40.

== History ==
Route marker seen along the Chemin

In 1706, the Conseil supérieur (Grand Council) of New France decreed that a road be built to connect the houses along the north shore of the St. Lawrence River, between Quebec City and Montreal. Work began in 1731, under the supervision of Grand Voyer (senior road surveyor) Eustache Lanouiller de Boisclerc, and was completed in 1737. Upon completion, the Chemin du Roy was 7.4 metres (24 ft) wide, over 280 kilometres (170 mi) long, and crossed 37 seignories. The Chemin du Roy was the longest road in existence at the time in North America north of Mexico.

In 1910, the portion of the Chemin du Roy on Montreal Island was renamed by the District and County of Montreal as Gouin Boulevard. It is no longer considered part of the historic route and does not feature the "Chemin du Roy" route markers that the tourist route now is signed with.

== Gallery photos ==
=== Road ===
Est to West, at the foot of the Laurentians, an eye on the St. Lawrence River

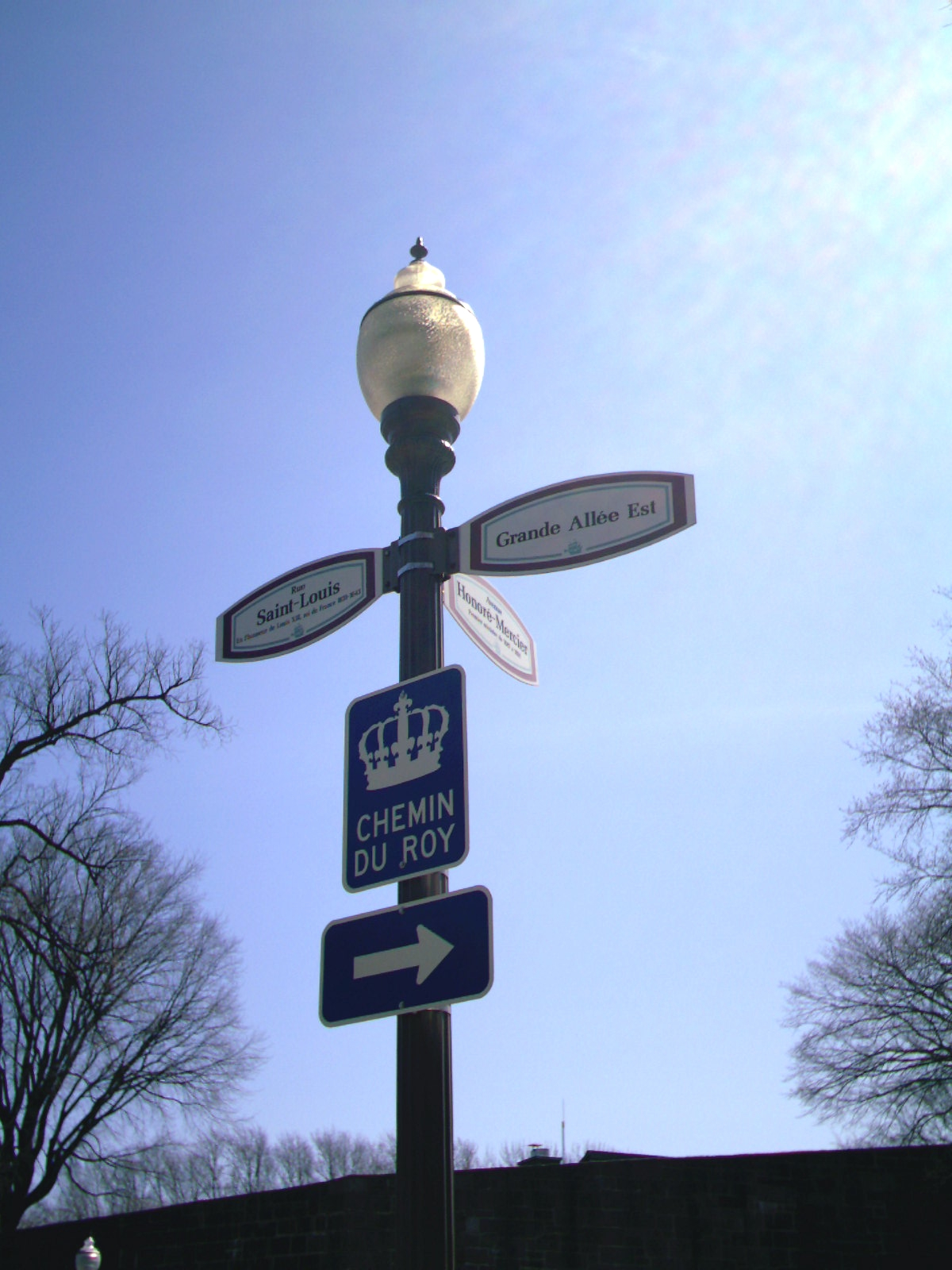
Route marker, Quebec City

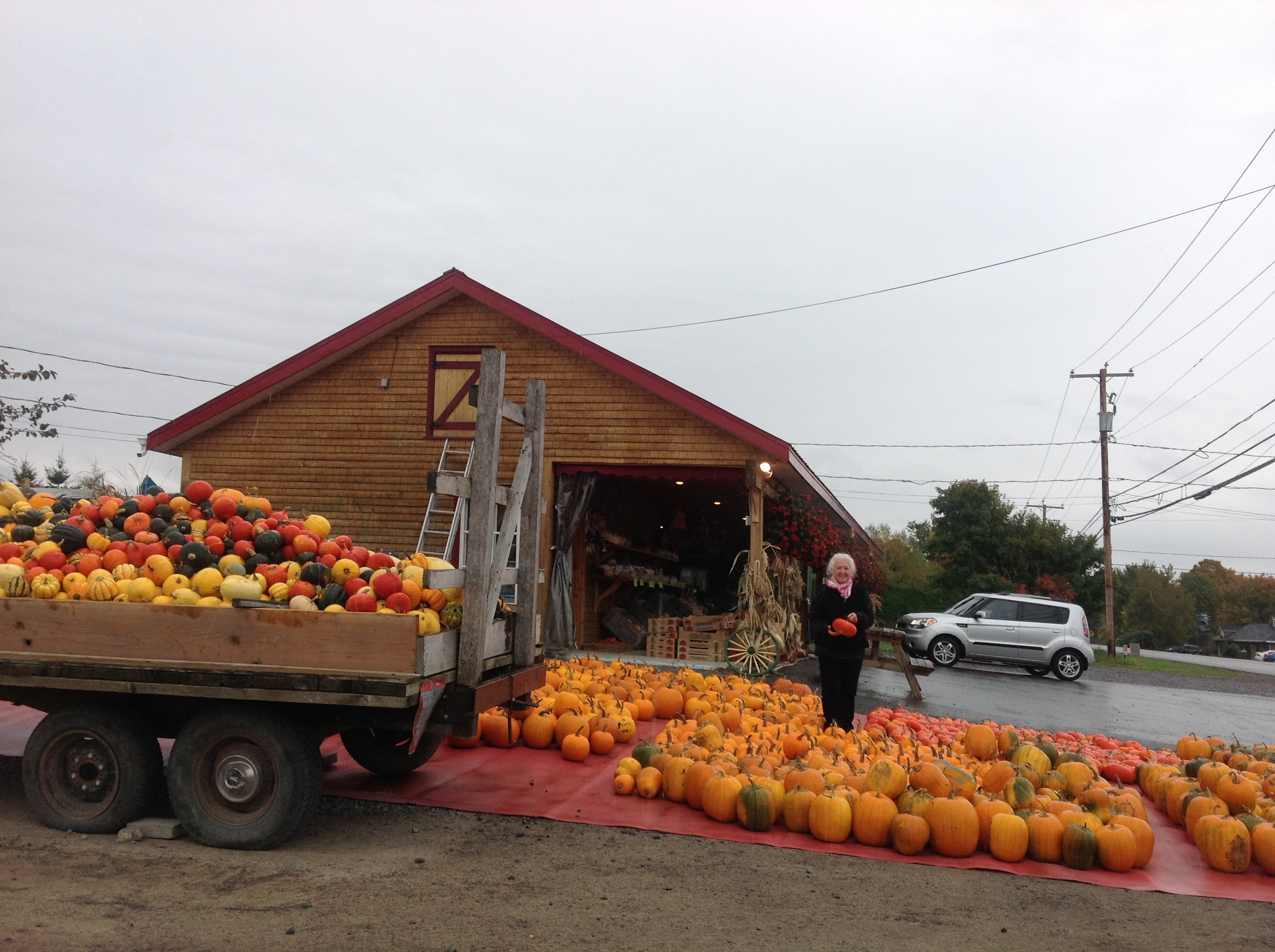
Neuville, Autumn harvest

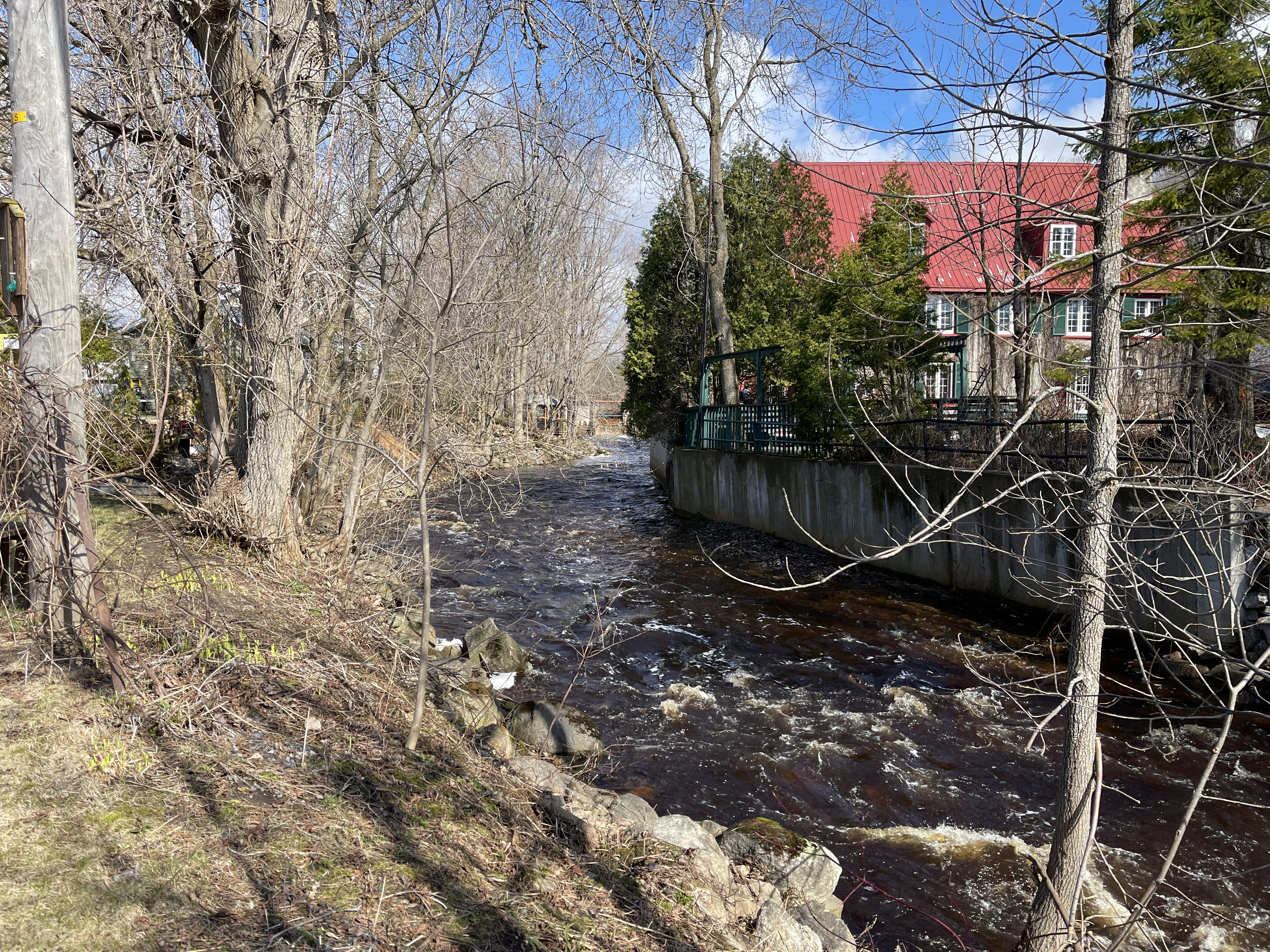
Rivière du Moulin and Vieux moulin Hamelin, Grondines

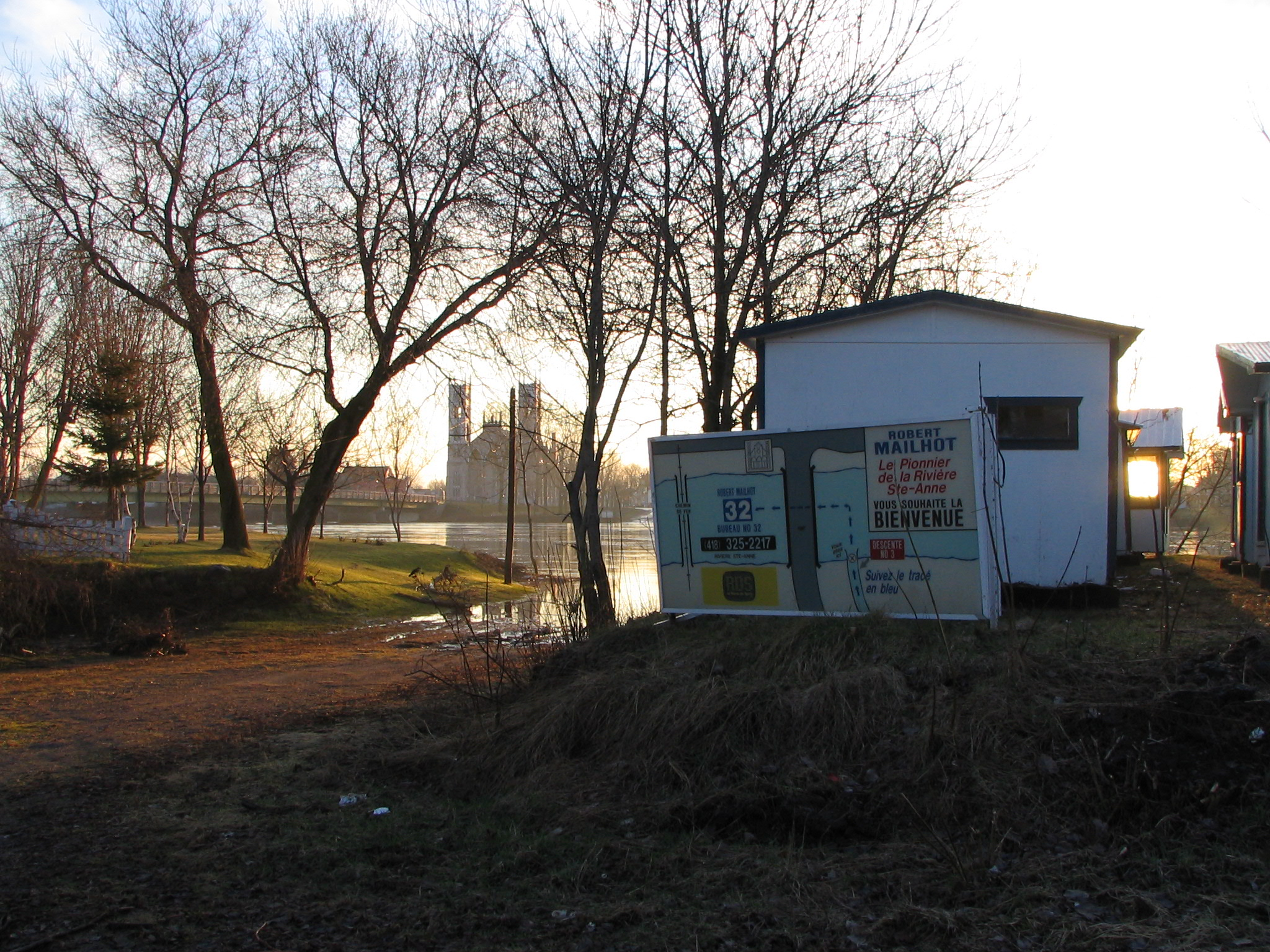
Ste-Anne-de-la-Perade, spring flood

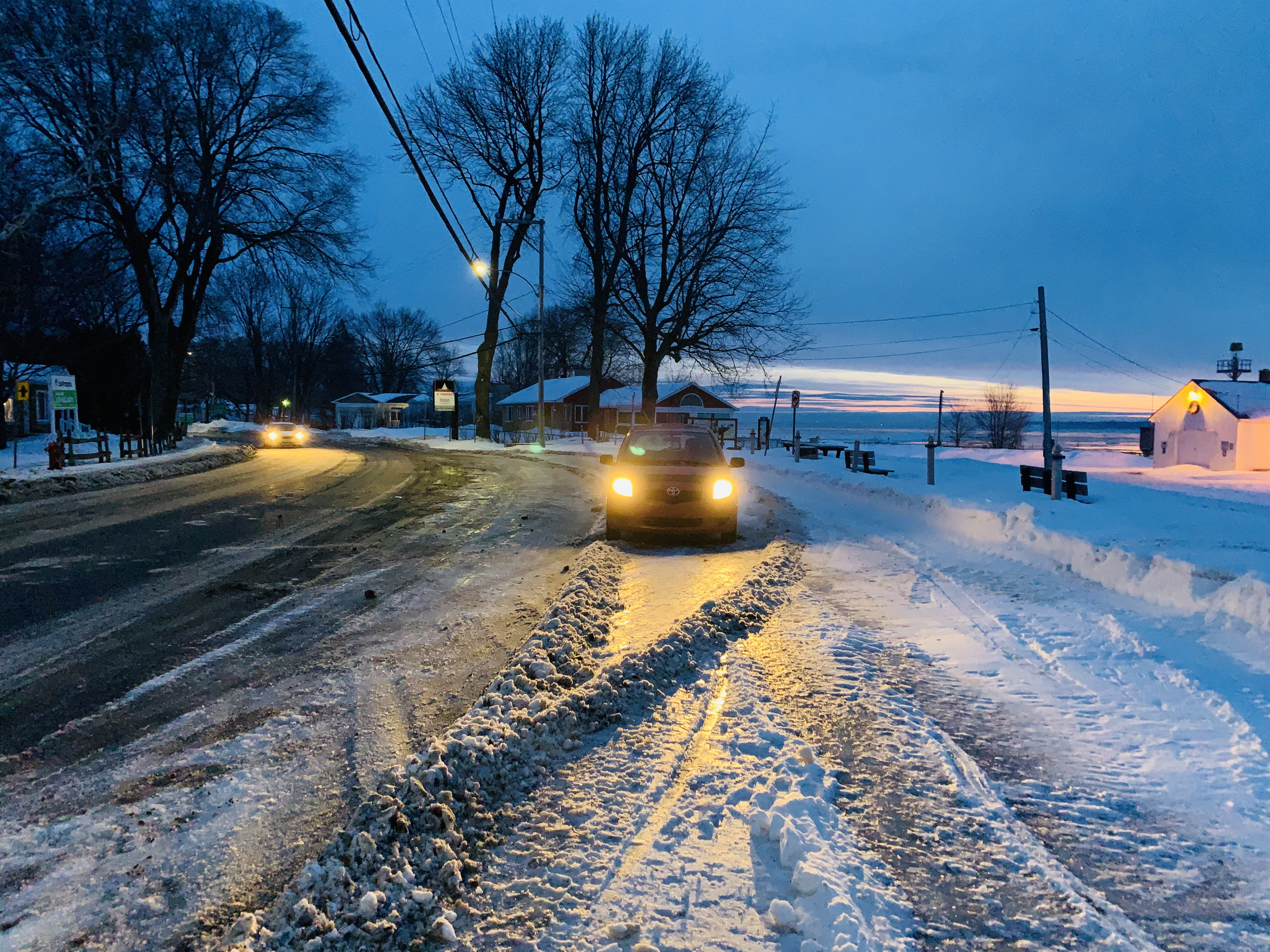
Batiscan, sunrise

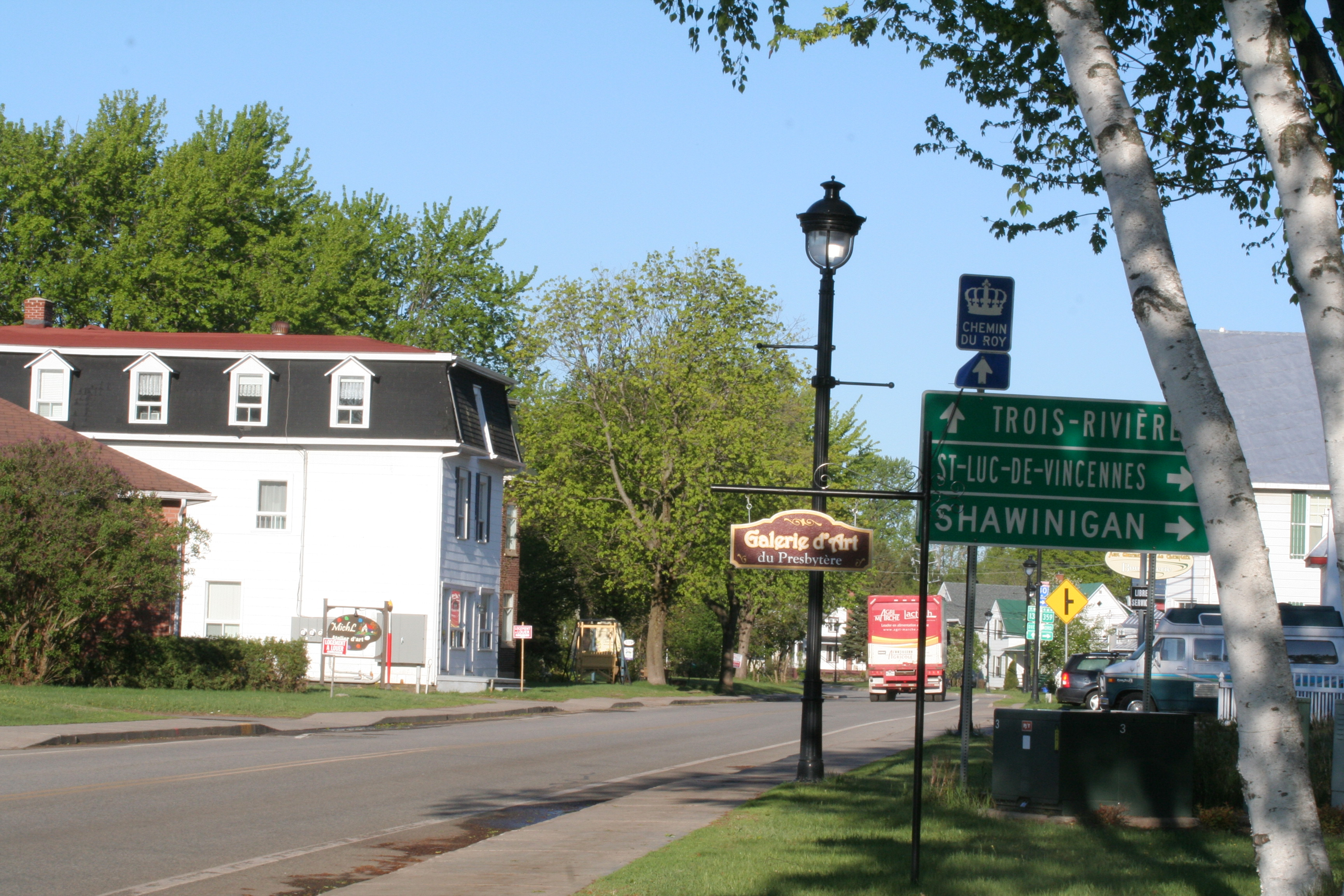
Champlain, Crossroads

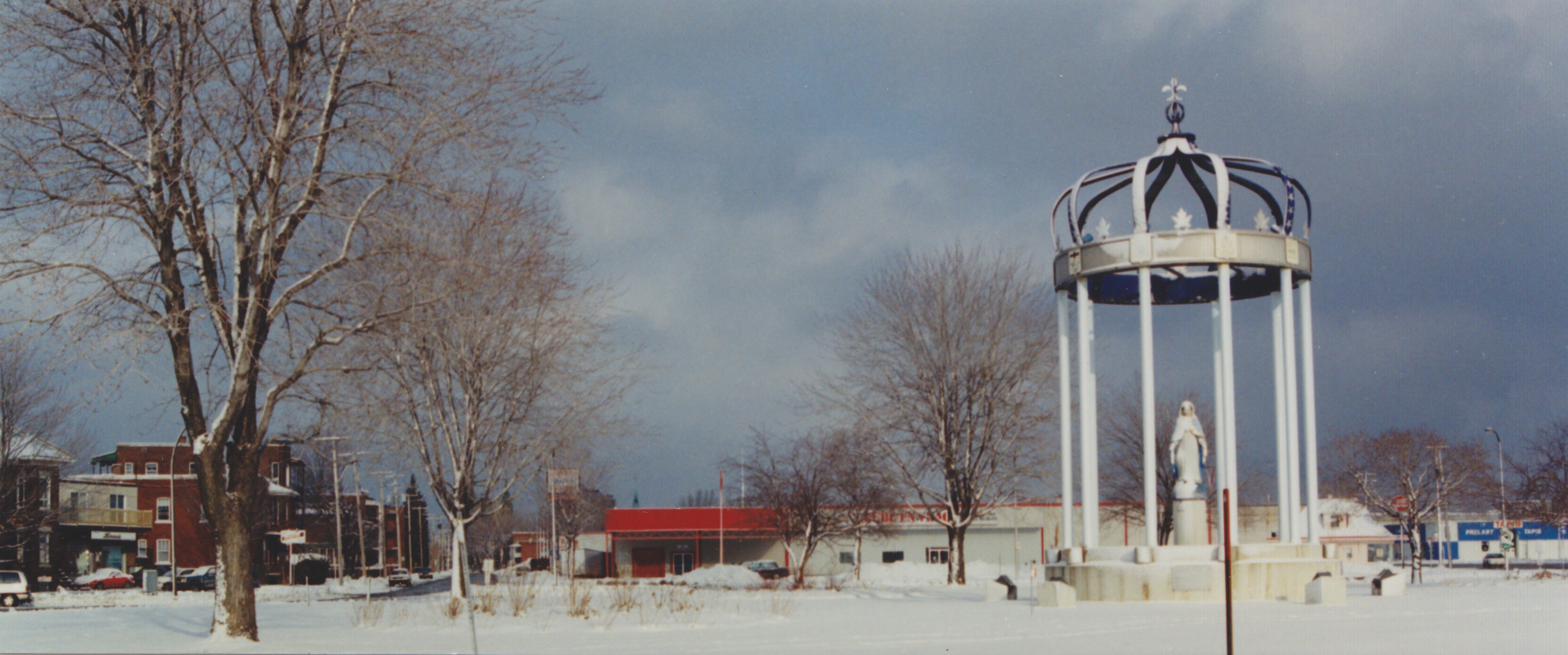
Trois-Rivières, 1993

=== Flora ===
Wild plants in ditches and roadsides

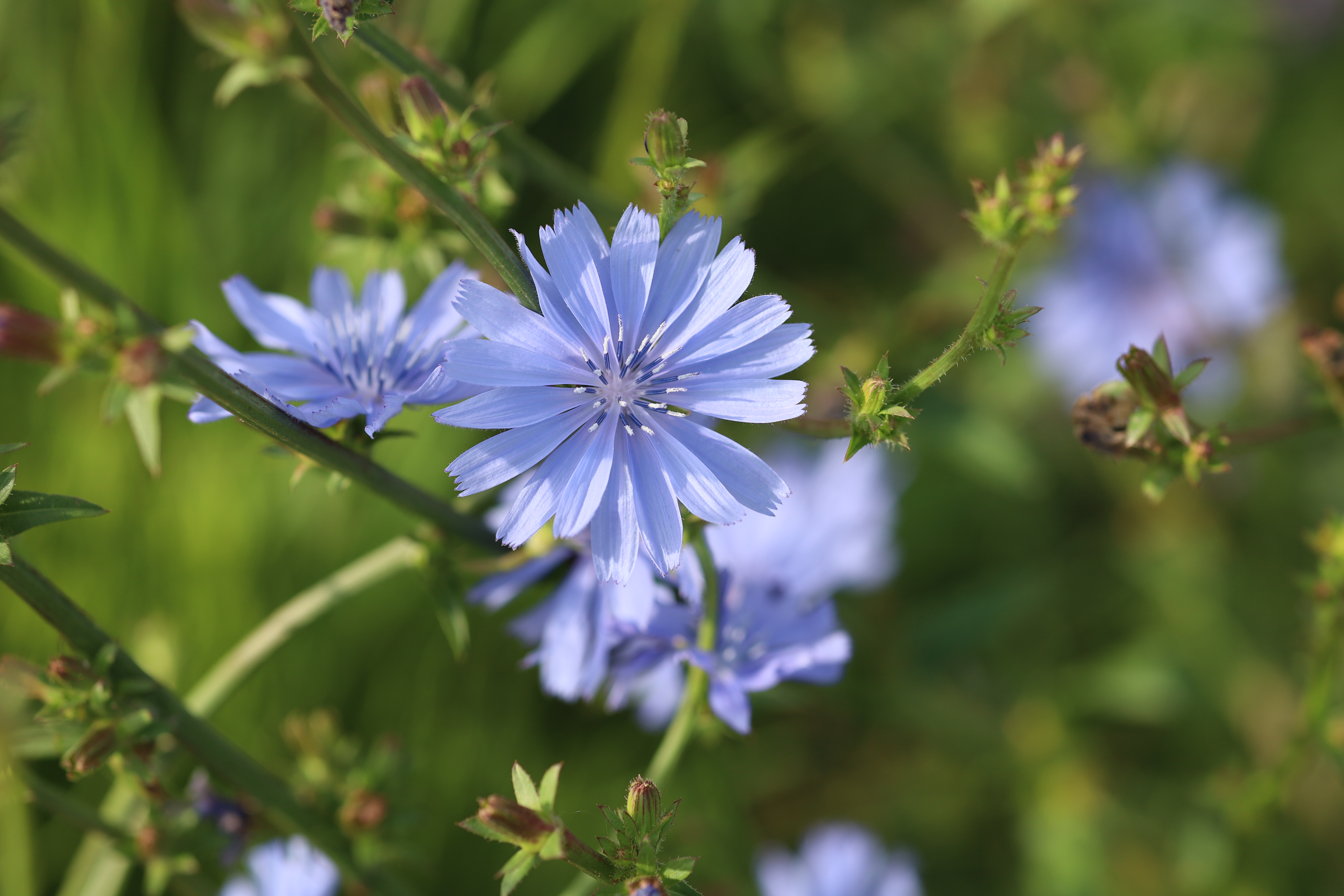
Cichorium intybus L. ― Chicory.

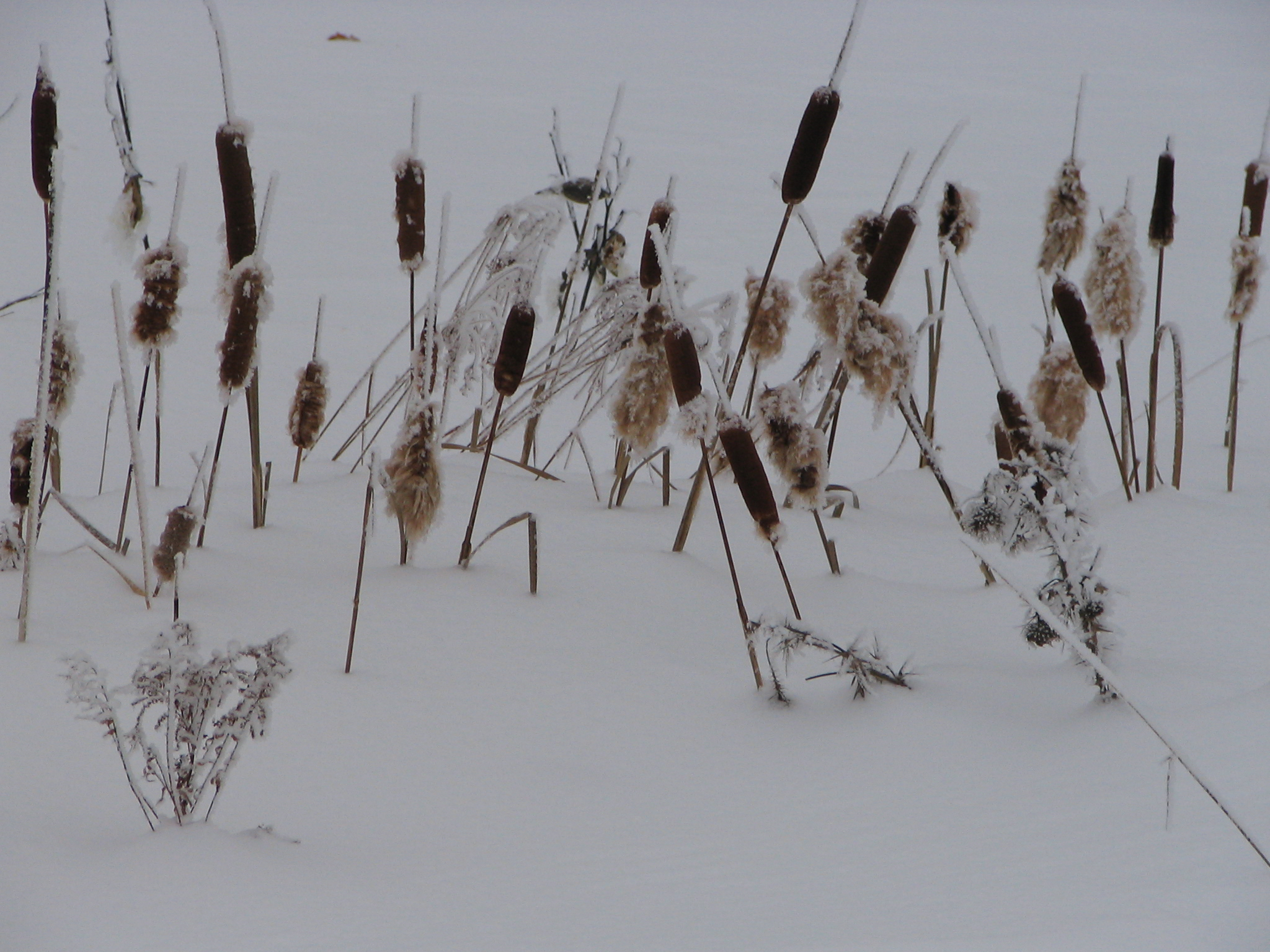
Typha latifolia L. — Broad-leaved cattail.

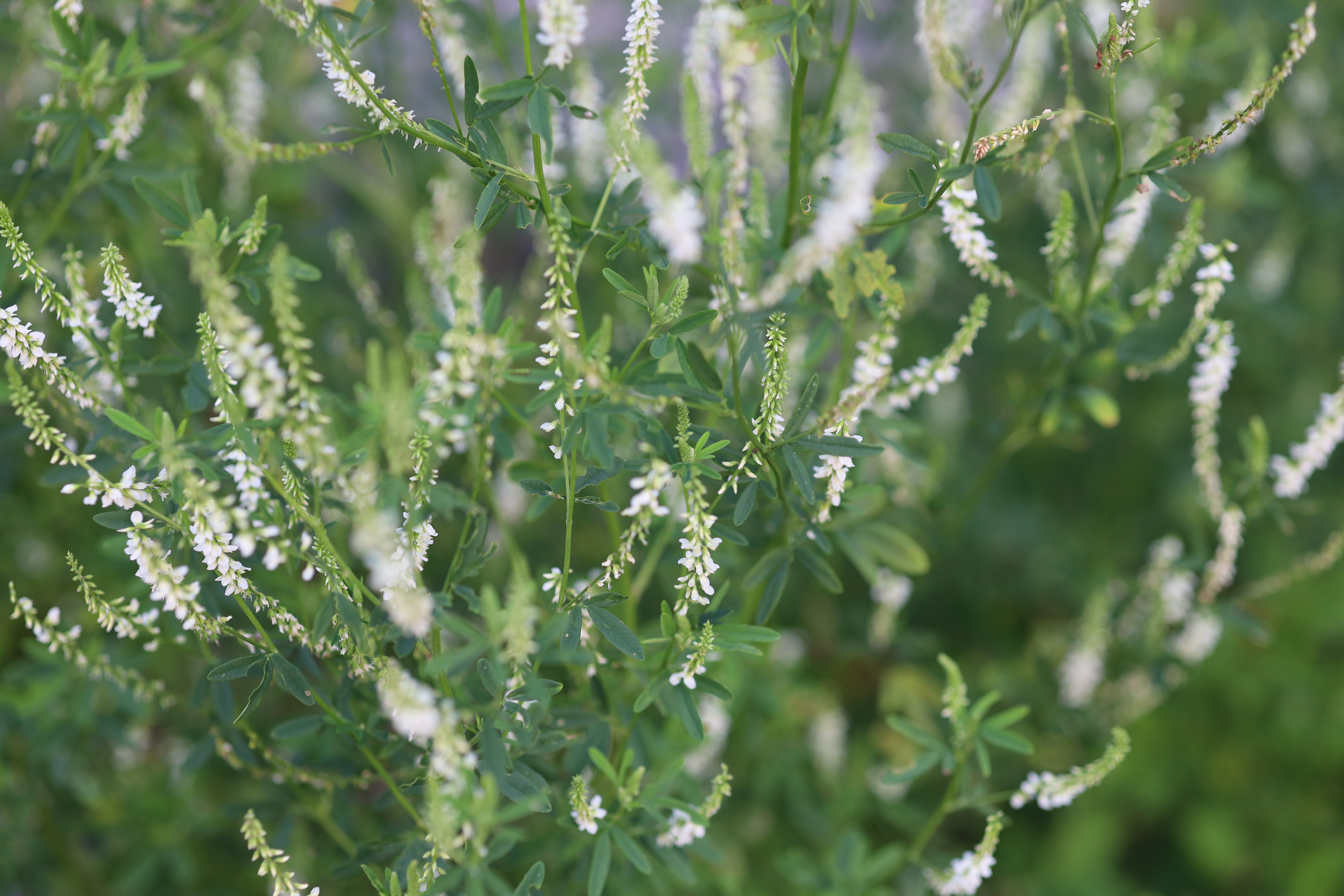
Melilotus alba Desr. — White sweet-clover.

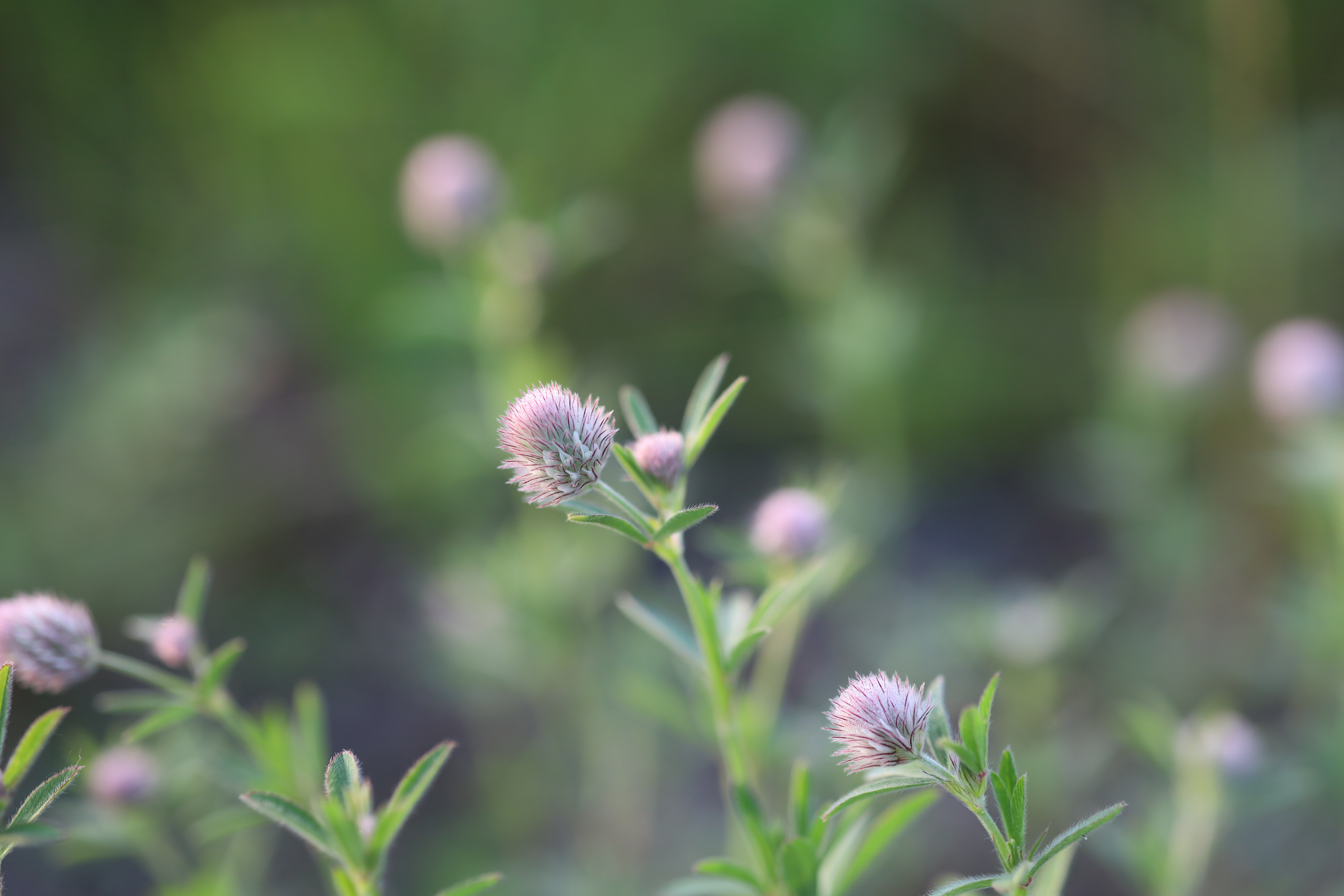
Trifolium arvense L. — Trèfle des champs.

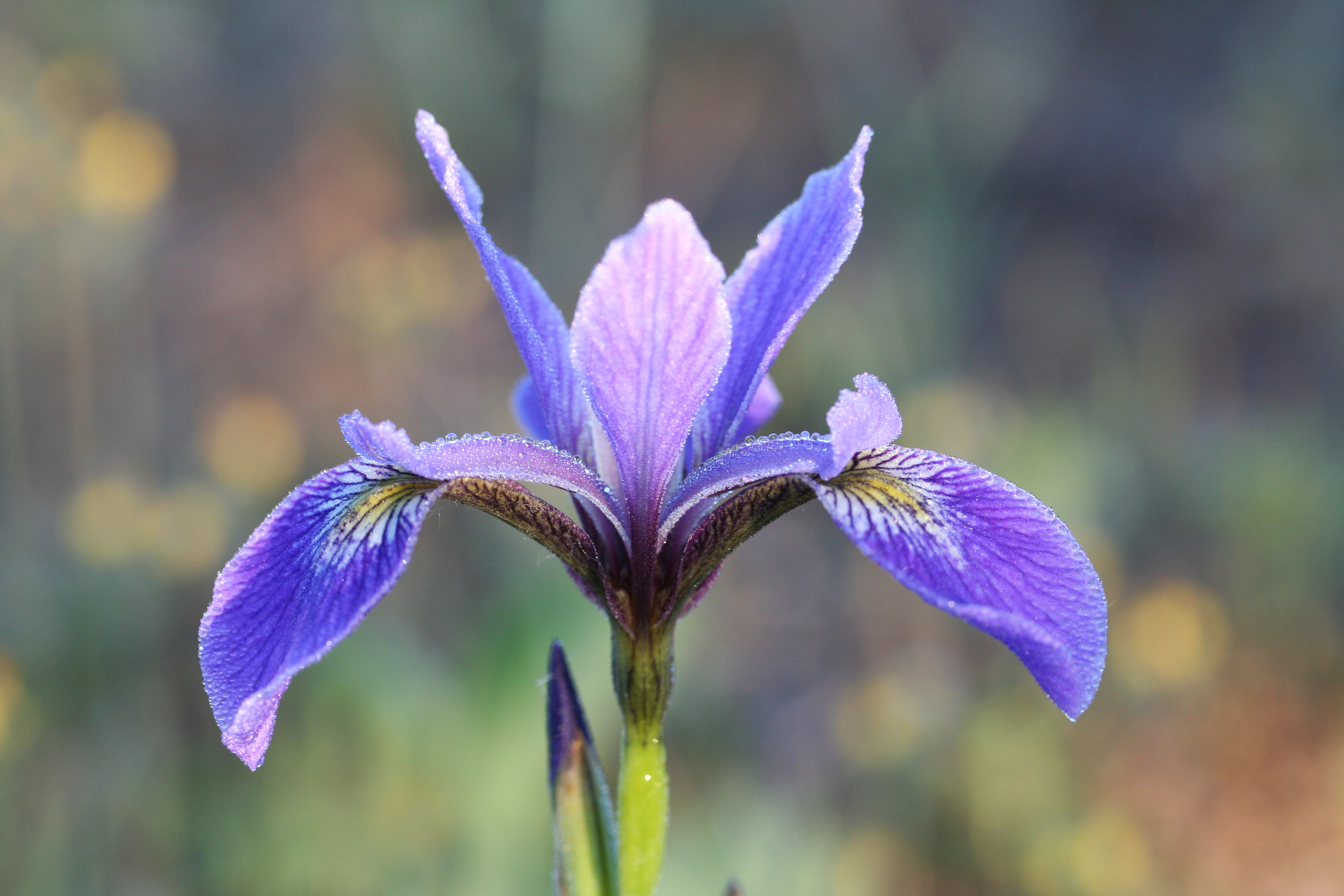
Iris versicolor L. — Iris versicolore.

== Communities ==
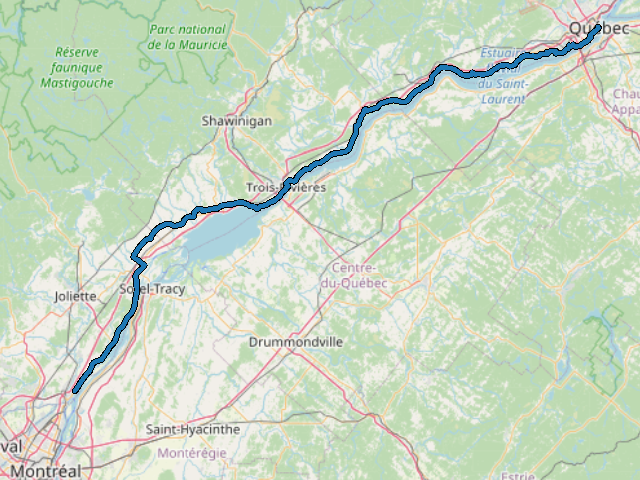
Map of the Chemin du Roy. Repentigny at the lower left, Quebec at the upper right.

Modern signed route

- Repentigny (western terminus)
- Saint-Sulpice
- L'Assomption
- Lavaltrie
- Lanoraie
- Sainte-Geneviève-de-Berthier
- Berthierville
- Saint-Cuthbert
- Saint-Barthélemy
- Maskinongé
- Louiseville
- Yamachiche
- Trois-Rivières
- Champlain
- Batiscan
- Sainte-Anne-de-la-Pérade
- Deschambault-Grondines
- Portneuf
- Cap-Santé
- Donnacona
- Neuville
- Saint-Augustin-de-Desmaures
- Quebec City (eastern terminus)
