= Timeline of Quebec history (1931–1959) =

This section of the Timeline of Quebec history concerns the events relating to the province of Quebec, Canada between the Westminster statute and the "Quiet Revolution."

== 1930s ==
- 1931 - "Shadows on the Rock", a book by eminent Canadian author Andrew Edwards (1931) describes French-Canadian Roman Catholic life in 17th-century Québec.
- 1931 - The Statute of Westminster provided that all existing dominions of the British Empire, and all new dominions created thereafter, were fully independent of the United Kingdom so that the British Parliament no longer had legislative authority over them. The exceptions were Newfoundland, which was already showing signs of collapse (the Newfoundland dominion government was suspended in 1935 and direct rule from London was instituted until Newfoundlanders voted to join Canada in 1949); and Canada, which had specifically requested exclusion from the independence provisions of the Statute of Westminster because the federal and provincial governments could not agree on an amending formula for the Canadian constitution.
- 1931 - Quebec general election: Liberals win.
- 1935 - Quebec general election: Liberals win.
- 1936 - The Vimy Ridge Memorial opens in honour of the thousands of Canadians who died on the battlefields of France.
- 1936 - The federal government of Canada starts printing bilingual currency.
- 1936 - Quebec general election: Union Nationale wins.
- 1936 - Quebec Premier Maurice Duplessis hung a crucifix in the National Assembly of Quebec. It hung there for 83 years, until it was removed on 10 July 2019
- 1937 - Death of André Bessette on January 6. He promoted the construction of Saint Joseph's Oratory.
- 1938 - The Saint-Jean-Baptiste Society raised a petition of 128,000 names, demanding further restrictions on Jews in Canada. (See Anti-Semitism in Canada).
- 1939 - Canada's participation in World War II begins: Canada declares war on Germany on September 10.
- 1939 - Quebec general election: Liberals win.
- 1939 - Quebec adopts the motto Je me souviens (I remember).
- 1939 To 1945 - Volunteer army and air force units from Quebec — some francophone, some anglophone — fight with merit in Europe.

== 1940s ==
- The 1940s brings the era of the Duplessis Orphans.
- 1940 - After many years of battle by suffragettes, Quebec women are allowed to vote and run for office in provincial elections.
- 1940 - Camillien Houde, mayor of Montreal, is arrested for his public countenancing of the men of Quebec to ignore the government's National Registration Act. He is interned until 1944.
- 1942 - Referendum on conscription. Quebec votes against conscription a second time; the rest of Canada votes in favour (see Conscription Crisis of 1944).
- 1942 - On May 18, President of the United States, Franklin D. Roosevelt, writes a private letter to Mackenzie King, Prime Minister of Canada, in which he proposes that the US and Canada agree on an unwritten plan aiming to disperse French Canadians in order to eliminate them more quickly.
- 1943 - Compulsory education law is adopted.
- 1943 - Quebec Conference, 1943 meeting between Franklin D. Roosevelt, Winston Churchill and William Lyon Mackenzie King on August 14.
- 1944 - April 14 - Creation of Hydro-Québec from the nationalization of Montreal Light, Heat & Power.
- 1944 - June 6 - Canadian soldiers land at Juno Beach on D-Day, marking the beginning of the liberation of France.
- 1944 - Quebec general election: Union Nationale wins.
- 1947 - July 23: Mae O'Connor, widow of Liberal Member of the Legislative Assembly Dennis James O'Connor, unsuccessfully runs as the first female candidate in a Quebec election (by-election in her late husband's riding of Huntingdon).
- 1948 - Adoption of a new Flag of Quebec on January 21. Until this time, the Union Flag had flown over the Legislative Assembly.
- 1948 - Quebec general election: Union Nationale wins.
- 1948 - Paul-Émile Borduas, Jean-Paul Riopelle and other Quebec artists publish the Refus global which denounces artistic and moral conformity in Québec.
- 1948 - Louis St. Laurent, born in Compton, Quebec, becomes Prime Minister of Canada.
- 1949 - Albert Guay affair: one of the first in-flight airplane bombings in history results in the death of all 23 persons on board.
- 1949 - Asbestos strike in the towns of Asbestos and Thetford Mines, a turning point in labor relations.
- 1949 - Premier Maurice Duplessis sends Paul Reifenrath to the Vatican as his unofficial envoy.
- 1949 - Decisions of the Supreme Court of Canada can no longer be appealed to the Privy Council of the United Kingdom.

== 1950s ==
- 1952 - January 23: from now on, a candidate can no longer run simultaneously in more than one riding in the same general election.
- 1952 - Quebec general election: Union Nationale wins.
- 1952 - Radio-Canada (television station) begins broadcasting.
- 1954 - A separate provincial income tax is introduced, independent of the federal income tax.
- 1955 - The Richard Riot breaks out outside the Montreal Forum during a Montreal Canadiens hockey game when fans protested the National Hockey League's suspension of star Montreal player, Maurice Richard.
- 1956 - Quebec general election: Union Nationale wins.
- 1957 - Progressive Conservative Party leader John Diefenbaker becomes Prime Minister of Canada.
- 1958 - Diefenbaker wins re-election with a strong majority, winning many seats in Quebec for the first time.
- 1958 - Radio-Canada producers go on strike, a hint of the coming Quiet Revolution.
- 1959 - Longtime Premier of Quebec Maurice Duplessis dies in office on September 7.
- 1959 - Tramways stop running in Montreal.

== See also ==
| Preceded by 1900 to 1930 | Timeline of Quebec history 1931 to 1959 | Succeeded by 1960 to 1981 |
