= Timeline of Quebec history (1841–1866) =

This section of the Timeline of Quebec history concerns the events in British North America relating to what is the present day province of Quebec, Canada from the passage of the Union Act to the passage of the British North America Act, 1867.

== 1840s ==
- 1841 – The Act of Union governing British North America, passed by the British Parliament, takes effect.
- 1848 - Article 41 of the Union Act is amended. It is now legal to use the French language in the Parliament and in the Courts.
- 1849 - The first responsible government was instituted, under the Liberal coalition of Robert Baldwin from Canada West and Louis-Hippolyte Lafontaine of Canada East. The first Prime Minister of United Canada is Louis-Hippolyte Lafontaine.
- 1849 - On April 25, The Parliament of Canada passes the Rebellion Losses Bill to compensate people who suffered property damage during the Rebellions of 1837 in Lower Canada. The bill compensated everyone, including the rebels and as a result, protestors caused a riot that forced the military to step in. A fire was started and the Parliament of Canada buildings in Montreal were burned down. See Burning of the Parliament (Montreal).
- 1849 - On October 11, an Annexation Manifesto, supported by both English speaking and French speaking Canadians, calling for the Province of Canada to join the United States is published in the Montreal Gazette.

== 1850s ==
- 1850 - Beginning of the French-Canadian emigration to the United States. See Quebec emigration.
- 1851 - The first official census confirms that the population of Canada West is now numerically superior to that of Canada East.
- 1851 - Politicians in the colony begin to discuss representation by population.
- 1854 - The French seigneurial system of land tenancy is finally abolished in Canada East but its effects will linger for another hundred years.

== 1860s ==
- 1860 - Built by Grand Trunk Railway, the Jubilee Bridge (now the Victoria Bridge) is the first bridge linking the Island of Montreal to the South Shore.
- 1864 - The Great Coalition holds conferences on a confederation project;
- 1864 - Quebec Conference of 1864 held to discuss Canadian Confederation which will lead to the creation of Canada.

| Preceded by 1791 to 1840 | Timeline of Quebec history 1841 to 1865 | Succeeded by 1867 to 1899 |
