= Timeline of Quebec history (1867–1899) =

This section of the Timeline of Quebec history concerns the events relating to the province of Quebec, Canada between the enactment of the British North America Act 1867 and the end of the 19th century.

== 1860s ==
- 1867 — Following the Great Coalition, upon the request of its colonial representatives their British North America Act 1867 is passed by the Parliament of Great Britain. Rather than remain a colony of Great Britain, the citizens of Quebec vote to join with New Brunswick, Nova Scotia and Ontario to create the nation of Canada.
- 1867 — Quebec general election: In August, the first provincial elections are held under the British North America Act 1867. The Bleus (Conservatives) support the confederation while the Rouges (Liberals) oppose it. 55% of Quebecers vote in favour of the new Confederation of Canada while 45% oppose.
- 1868 — Thomas D'Arcy McGee, Member of Parliament in Montreal-West, is assassinated by an Irish Fenian, Patrick J. Whelan.
- 1869 — January 16 - In Montreal, Hugh Graham and George T. Lanigan found the Montreal Evening Star.

== 1870s ==
- 1870 — A major forest fire ravages the Saguenay–Lac-Saint-Jean region, leaving a third of the population homeless.
- 1871 — The Parliament of New Brunswick passes the Common Schools Act.
- 1871 — Quebec general election: Conservatives win.
- 1873 — The House of Commons disallows "double mandates": the same person can no longer simultaneously hold a seat in the House of Commons and a provincial legislature.
- 1873 — Foundation of the Banque d'Hochelaga.
- 1874 — The Legislative Assembly of Quebec passes its own law to the same effect (abolishing double mandates).
- 1874 — The Montreal Stock Exchange is founded.
- 1875 — February 23: New electoral law: voting is now secret and takes place in all ridings on the same day.
- 1875 — Quebec general election: Conservatives win.
- 1877 — The Parliament of Prince Edward Island passes the Public Schools Act.
- 1878 — Quebec general election: Conservatives win one more seat than the Liberals, but Liberal Henri-Gustave Joly de Lotbinière nonetheless remains premier.
- 1878 — The Legislative Assembly passes a law abolishing the Legislative Council, but the latter does not agree to its own demise (which would not occur until 1968).
- 1879 — The rules of ice hockey are established by three McGill students.

== 1880s ==
- 1881 — The First Acadian Congress is held in Memramcook, New Brunswick.
- 1881 — Quebec general election: Conservatives win.
- 1884 — The Acadian national flag is adopted.
- 1884 — Founding of La Presse (newspaper) in Montreal.
- 1885 — The Canadian Pacific railroad (from Montreal to Vancouver) is completed: the "last spike" is driven in on November 7.
- 1885 — Tried and found guilty, rebel Louis Riel is hanged on November 16.
- 1885 — Popular assembly held at Champ de Mars (in Montreal) on November 22 in reaction to Riel's hanging. Honoré Mercier calls for the creation of a new political party, the Parti National.
- 1886 — Quebec general election: Liberals win, but Conservative minority government remains in office for a few more months.
- 1886 — The first transcanadian train leaves Montreal for Vancouver in British Columbia.
- 1887 — Honoré Mercier, leader of the Parti national (Liberals), becomes premier of Quebec. The name "Parti National" is soon abandoned and the party calls itself the Liberal party.

== 1890s ==
- 1890 — Quebec general election: Liberals win.
- 1891 — Quebec premier Honoré Mercier removed from office by Lieutenant-Governor Auguste-Réal Angers after being accused of corruption. The following year he is cleared of all charges.
- 1892 — Quebec general election: Conservatives win.
- 1892 — Montreal has electric streetcars for the first time.
- 1896 — Wilfrid Laurier, born in Saint-Lin, Quebec, becomes the first Quebecer to be elected Prime Minister of Canada.
- 1896 — In a decision by the British Privy Council, the federal government loses the right to veto provincial laws.
- 1897 — Quebec general election: Liberals win.
- 1898 — The Parliament of Canada passes the Quebec Boundary Extension Act, 1898 extending the northern boundary of the province of Quebec to the Eastmain River.

Federal Referendum on Alcohol. Passes in all provinces except Quebec

- 1899 — The Second Boer War erupts in South Africa. 7000 English Canadians are willing to participate in support of Great Britain, while most French-speaking Quebecers are opposed. This foreshadowed the Conscription Crisis of 1917 and the Conscription Crisis of 1944.

== See also ==
Preceded by 1841 to 1866	Timeline of Quebec history 1867 to 1899	Succeeded by 1900 to 1930
