= Rivière des Étangs =

Watercourse in Portneuf, Québec, Canada

- Location within Quebec

Location
- Country: Canada
- Province: Quebec
- Region: Capitale-Nationale
- Regional County Municipality: Portneuf Regional County Municipality
- Municipality: Saint-Casimir, Deschambault-Grondines

Physical characteristics
- Source: Agricultural and forestry stream (ruisseau du Grand Nord)
  - location: Deschambault-Grondines
  - coordinates: 46.65906°N 72.10189°W
  - elevation: 37
- Mouth: Rivière du Moulin
  - location: Deschambault-Grondines
  - coordinates: 46.61111°N 72.08916°W
  - elevation: 7 m
- Length: 8.2 km (5.1 mi)

Basin features
- Tributaries
  - right: Ruisseau Allard

The Rivière des Étangs (English: river of ponds) is a tributary of the rivière du Moulin, descending in the municipality of Saint-Casimir and Deschambault-Grondines, in the Portneuf Regional County Municipality, in the administrative region of Capitale-Nationale, in Quebec, in Canada.

The Étangs river valley is mainly served by the Nicolas road, the third range west road and the route 363 (route Guilbault) which is perpendicular to the northwest bank of the river.

Agriculture is the main economic activity in the sector; forestry, second.

The surface of the Moulin river (except the rapids areas) is generally frozen from the beginning of December to the end of March; however, safe circulation on the ice is generally from late December to early March. The water level of the river varies with the seasons and the precipitation; the spring flood occurs in March or April.

== Geography ==
The Rivière des Étangs has its source in an agricultural zone in Deschambault-Grondines at the confluence of the Ruisseau du Grand Nord, near the limit of Saint-Casimir, between the course of the Sainte-Anne River and the Canadian Pacific railway. This source is located 8.8 kilometres (5.5 mi) northwest of the northwest shore of the St. Lawrence River; 4.9 kilometres (3.0 mi) south of the village center of Saint-Marc-des-Carrières; and 14.2 kilometres (8.8 mi) north of the mouth of the Sainte-Anne river.

From its source, the Étangs river then flows over a distance of 8.2 kilometres (5.1 mi), with a drop in level of 30 metres (98 ft). Its course descends first to the southwest in the agricultural and forest zone, entering in Saint-Casimir, then to the southeast reentering in Deschambault-Grondines, bending to the east, crossing the Canadian Pacific Railway, to its mouth.

The confluence of the Étangs river flows into a bend in the Moulin river). This confluence is located 1.0 kilometre (0.62 mi) southeast of the Canadian Pacific Railway railway; 4.3 kilometres (2.7 mi) west of the village center of Grondines; 10.9 kilometres (6.8 mi) north-east of the confluence of the Sainte-Anne river with the Saint-Laurent river; 12.7 kilometres (7.9 mi) south-west of the village center of Deschambault-Grondines.

== Toponymy ==
The "rivière des Étangs" refers to ponds that once existed before the digging of ditches and streams in agricultural areas in the upper part of its course.

The toponym "Rivière des Étangs" was formalized on August 17, 1978, at the Place Names Bank of the Commission de toponymie du Québec.

== See also ==
- List of rivers of Quebec

== Bibliography ==
- CAPSA (2014). Plans directeurs de l'eau des secteurs d'intervention de la zone de gestion de la CAPSA: Sainte-Anne, Portneuf et La Chevrotière (Water master plans of the intervention sectors of the CAPSA management area: Sainte-Anne, Portneuf and La Chevrotière) (PDF). Quebec: CAPSA. p. 691. Archived from the original (PDF) on 2019-02-14.
