= Timeline of Quebec history (1960–1981) =

This section of the Timeline of Quebec history concerns the events between the Quiet Revolution and the patriation of the British North America Act.

== 1960s ==
- 1960 - The Montreal Canadiens win the Stanley Cup for the fifth consecutive season. As of 2024, they are the only National Hockey League franchise to do so.
- 1960 – Quebec general election: The election of a new Liberal Party government led by Premier Jean Lesage marks the beginning of a period of sustained change known as the Quiet Revolution.
- 1960 – Foundation of the Rassemblement pour l'indépendance nationale. See History of the Quebec sovereigntist movement.
- 1961 – December 14: Marie-Claire Kirkland becomes the first woman Member of the Legislative Assembly and also the first woman cabinet member.
- 1962 – The construction of the Montreal Metro (subway) begins.
- 1962 – The Champlain Bridge in Montreal is partly opened to traffic.
- 1962 – Quebec general election: Liberals win.
- 1963 – Front de libération du Québec (FLQ) members, Gabriel Hudon and Raymond Villeneuve are sentenced to 12 years in prison for manslaughter after their bomb killed Sgt. Wilfred V. O'Neill, a watchman at Montreal's Canadian Army Recruiting Centre. See Front de libération du Québec.
- 1963 – Second wave of the nationalization of electricity. On April 30, Hydro-Québec acquires 8 private producers of hydroelectricity.
- 1963 – July 10: Voting age lowered from 21 to 18 in Quebec elections.
- 1964 – A ministry of education, separate from the Catholic clergy, is created by the Quebec government.
- 1964 – Married women obtain full legal rights (to buy property without their husband's signature, and so forth).
- 1965 – Canada adopts the maple leaf flag in February.
- 1966 – Quebec general election: Union Nationale wins.
- 1967 – Quebec celebrates the 100th anniversary of its joining in the creation of the nation of Canada
- 1967 – As part of Canada's centennial celebrations, the Universal Exposition of Montreal, better known as Expo 67, opens for the summer.
- 1967 – Completion of the construction of Saint Joseph's Oratory on Montreal's Mount Royal.
- 1967 – Visiting President of France Charles de Gaulle shouts "Vive le Québec libre!" from the balcony of Montreal city hall. De Gaulle cancelled the rest of his official visit to Canada after Prime Minister Lester B. Pearson said: "Certain statements by President de Gaulle tend to encourage the small minority of our population whose aim is to destroy Canada: and as such, they are unacceptable to the Canadian people and its government."
- 1967 – In October, René Lévesque leaves the Quebec Liberal Party and founds the Mouvement Souveraineté-Association.
- 1968 – On Monday, June 24, 290 people are arrested during the lundi de la matraque civil disorder during the St-Jean-Baptiste parade.
- 1968 – Pierre Trudeau, born in Montreal, Quebec, is elected Prime Minister of Canada. See 1968 federal election.
- 1968 – On August 28, the Théâtre du rideau vert premieres Michel Tremblay's play Les Belles-Sœurs, which sells out its entire run in two days and revolutionizes the entertainment world by using Quebec French joual instead of "Parisian" French.
- 1968 – On October 26, the Parti Québécois is created out of the merger of René Lévesque's Mouvement Souveraineté-Association and the Ralliement national. See History of the Quebec sovereigntist movement.
- 1968 – The Université du Québec network is created by the government.
- 1968 – The government-operated Radio-Québec (television station) is founded. In the 1990s it was renamed Télé-Québec.
- 1968 – The Legislative Council, the non-elected upper house of Quebec's parliament, is abolished at the end of the year.
- 1969 – The Parliament of Canada, under Prime Minister Pierre Trudeau, passes Bill C-120 : An Act Respecting the Status of Official Languages in Canada, making both French and English the official languages of all Canada. See Official Languages Act.
- 1969 – The Union Nationale government of Jean-Jacques Bertrand passes "Bill 63" which confirms the status quo on the language of instruction in the public schools (Parents can choose English or French).
- 1969 – The Montreal Expos baseball franchise begins play in Montreal.
- 1969 – FLQ paramilitary bomb the Montreal Stock Exchange.
- 1969 – Montreal's 3,700 police and firefighters stage a wildcat strike, resulting in violence, looting, arson, and the death of two people.

== 1970s ==
- 1970 – Formation of the "Montreal Urban Community" on January 1, consisting of the central city of Montreal and its suburbs on the island of Montreal. Replaced in 2002 by the new "megacity" of Montreal.
- 1970 – Quebec general election: Liberals win.
- 1970 – Terrorist activities by the Front de libération du Québec culminated with the abduction of James Cross, the British Trade Commissioner to Canada, and Pierre Laporte, a provincial minister and Vice-Premier. Martial law is declared and civil rights are suspended. See the October Crisis.
- 1971 – Women are allowed to serve on juries.
- 1971 – Premier Bourassa launches the James Bay hydroelectric project.
- 1971 – Victoria Charter constitutional reform ends in failure.
- 1973 – Quebec general election: Liberals re-elected with 54.7% of the votes and a massive majority of seats (102 of 110).
- 1973 – The Royal Canadian Mounted Police steal the membership list of the Parti Québécois.
- 1974 – The Liberal government adopts "Bill 22" (Official Language Act (Quebec)) language legislation (later superseded by Bill 101).
- 1975 – The Quebec Charter of Human Rights and Freedoms is passed and comes into effect the following year.
- 1976 – The Summer Olympic Games are held in Montreal.
- 1976 - On September 26, the Expos play their final game at Parc Jarry.
- 1976 – Quebec general election: On November 15, the Parti Québécois (PQ) is elected. With a participation rate of 85.27%, the highest in Quebec's history, 41% of voters give 71 seats to the PQ.
- 1976 – Quebec-born author Saul Bellow wins the Nobel Prize for literature.
- 1977 - On April 15, the Expos play their first game at Olympic Stadium.
- 1977 – On August 26, the Quebec Charter of the French Language (Bill 101) becomes law.
- 1977 – The exodus of unilingual English speaking workers and businessmen, started with the economic boom of Toronto and the West, accelerates. Over the next decade, many English-speaking Canadians leave the province. Most settled in Ontario. An equally high number of Canadians moved from other provinces to settle in Ontario, where Toronto is booming, replacing Montreal as the metropolis of Canada since the end of the second world war.
- 1978 – "No-fault" automobile insurance comes into effect in Quebec.
- 1978 – National Assembly debates are televised for the first time, and to suit the cameras, the walls are painted blue instead of the previous green.
- 1979 - The Montreal Canadiens win the Stanley Cup for the fourth consecutive season and 22nd time overall.
- 1979 – Pierre Trudeau is defeated in the 1979 Canadian election and retires (he soon changes his mind).
- 1979 - The Quebec Nordiques join the National Hockey League after playing seven seasons in the World Hockey Association.

== 1980s ==
- 1980 – Pierre Trudeau returns to power as Prime Minister of Canada in the 1980 Canadian election.
- 1980 – Premier Lévesque puts sovereignty-association before the Quebec voters in a referendum. 60% of the Quebec electorate votes against it. See the Referendum of 1980.
- 1981 – Quebec general election: Parti Québécois re-elected.
- 1981 - The Expos defeat the Philadelphia Phillies in a best-of-five playoff to win the National League East Division. However, the Expos fall short of the World Series, losing the National League Championship Series to the Los Angeles Dodgers in five games. It would be the franchise's only postseason appearance until it moved to Washington, D.C. in 2005.
- 1981 – November 4–5: In the "Night of the Long Knives" (French: "La Nuit des Longs Couteaux"), Pierre Trudeau makes a constitutional deal with nine anglophone provinces without Quebec.

== See also ==
Preceded by 1931 to 1959	Timeline of Quebec history 1960 to 1981	Succeeded by 1982 to present
