= Timeline of Quebec history (1900–1930) =

This section of the Timeline of Quebec history concerns the events relating to the province of Quebec, Canada between the beginning of the 20th century and the Westminster statute.

== 1900s ==
- 1900 - Quebec general election: Liberals win.
- 1900 - Alphonse Desjardins founds the first credit union in North America on December 6 in Lévis.
- 1904 - Henri Bourassa pleads in favour of bilingualism in the institutions of the federal government.
- 1904 - Quebec general election: Liberals win.
- 1906 - Ernest Ouimet introduces cinema to Montreal with his Ouimetoscope.
- 1907 - The Montreal Chamber of Commerce founds the École des hautes études commerciales de Montréal.
- 1907 - The Quebec Bridge, under construction, collapses.
- 1908 - Quebec general election: Liberals win.

== 1910s ==
- 1910 - Henri Bourassa founds Le Devoir (newspaper).
- 1912 - The Parliament of Canada passes Quebec Boundaries Extension Act that extends the northern boundary of the province of Quebec to Hudson Strait.
- 1912 - Ontario limits the teaching in French to grades one and two of elementary school with Regulation 17.
- 1912 - Quebec general election: Liberals win.
- 1914 - Beginning of First World War.
- 1916 - English becomes the only authorized language of instruction in Manitoba. The province's sizeable French-speaking population is forced to attend English schools until 1970.
- 1916 - The Quebec bridge who was in construction fall in St-Lawrence river a second time, causing 13 deaths.
- 1916 - Quebec general election: Liberals win.
- 1917 - There are riots in Quebec as the federal government enforces conscription. See Conscription Crisis of 1917.
- 1918 - Liberal Member of the Legislative Assembly of Quebec Joseph-Napoléon Francoeur presents a motion demanding the independence of Quebec.
- 1918 - Lionel Groulx, becomes the first priest to publicly denounce what he considers injustices against French speakers. He denounces the unilingual English face of Montreal, the absence of bilingual coins and bank notes, and the absence of French in Ottawa, the federal capital.
- 1918 - Women win the right to vote in Canadian federal elections. All provinces follow suit by 1922 except Quebec, which does not give women the right to vote in provincial elections until 1940.
- 1919 - On May 8, the branch of Université Laval built in Montreal in 1878 becomes autonomous and is renamed Université de Montréal.
- 1919 - Quebec general election: Liberals win.

== 1920s ==
- 1920 - Marie-Anne Houde is found guilty of murder of her 10-year-old stepdaughter Aurore Gagnon in a trial that attracted public attention.
- 1921 - The Ku Klux Klan establishes itself in Montreal. The group is believed to be behind many criminal fires that destroyed religious institutions.
- 1922 - Joseph-Armand Bombardier engineers the first prototype of a snowmobile, the Snowdog. The first fully operational unit will be assembled in 1935.
- 1922 - Montreal radio station CKAC begins broadcasting, the first radio station in Quebec.
- 1923 - Quebec general election: Liberals win.
- 1925 - The Banque Canadienne Nationale is created out of the merger of the Banque d'Hochelaga and the Banque Nationale.
- 1927 - Quebec general election: Liberals win.
- 1927 - Following Canada's dispute with Great Britain, the Judicial Committee of the Privy Council rules on the border between the Labrador territory and the Province of Quebec.
- 1927 - April 1: by virtue of a new law, members of the Legislative Assembly no longer need to resign and stand for re-election in a by-election when they are named cabinet ministers.
- 1928 - The Judicial Committee of the Privy Council decides that women in Canada are legal "persons".
- 1929 - October stock market crash on Wall Street heralds the start of the Great Depression.

== See also ==
Preceded by 1867 to 1899	Timeline of Quebec history 1900 to 1930	Succeeded by 1931 to 1959
