= Timeline of Quebec history (1608–1662) =

This section of the Timeline of Quebec history concerns the events between the foundation of Quebec and establishment of the Sovereign Council.

== 1608-1609 ==
- 1603 - King Henry IV does commissions an exploratory and settlement expedition.
- 1608 - Samuel de Champlain founds Quebec City on July 3.
- 1609 - Champlain and the native allies of the French defeat the Iroquois.

== 1610s ==
- 1610 - Étienne Brûlé is sent by Champlain to live with the Algonquins
- 1613 - The habitation at Port Royal is destroyed by the troops of Samuel Argall
- 1615 - Arrival of the Récollets from Rouen on June 9.

== 1620s ==
- 1625 - Arrival of the Jesuits.
- 1627 - Armand Jean du Plessis, Cardinal de Richelieu founds the Compagnie de la Nouvelle France on April 29. King Louis XIII will grant them the monopoly on fur trade in return for their help in colonizing the St. Lawrence valley.
- 1627 - King Louis XIII introduces the seigneurial system and forbids settlement in New France by anyone other than Roman Catholics.
- 1629 - On July 16, three brothers, David, Louis, and Thomas Kirke take Quebec.

== 1630s ==
- 1632 - Signing of the Treaty of Saint-Germain-en-Laye on March 29. Acadia and Quebec are given back to France.
- 1632 - The Couillard-Hébert family receives the colony's first slave. He is a black boy from the West Indies. See Slavery in Canada.
- 1632 - Gabriel Sagard publishes Le Grand Voyage au pays des Hurons (The Great Voyage in Huron country) and a dictionary of the Huron language.
- 1634 - Sieur de La Violette founds a fur trading post and a fort, which later becomes the town of Trois-Rivières.
- 1634 - Hurons begin to drive out the Jesuits as disease decimates the Hurons.
- 1635 - The Jesuits found the Collège de Québec.
- 1635 - Samuel de Champlain dies on December 25.
- 1636 - Arrival of the new governor Charles Huault de Montmagny on June 12.
- 1639 - Foundation of the Société de Notre-Dame de Montréal.
- 1639 - Arrival of the Ursulines and the Hospitalières in the colony.

== 1640s ==
- 1641 - Beginning of the French and Iroquois Wars on June 13.
- 1641 - Arrival of Jeanne Mance on August 8.
- 1642 - Paul de Chomedey de Maisonneuve and Jeanne Mance found Ville-Marie, today Montreal on May 17.
- 1643 - Arrival of Louis d'Ailleboust de Coulonge et d'Argentenay, officer and military engineer.
- 1647 - Creation of the Conseil de Québec on March 27.
- 1648 - Beginning of the genocide of the Huron peoples by the Iroquois confederacy.
- 1648 - Louis d'Ailleboust becomes governor of New France after the refusal of Maisonneuve to take the position.
- 1648 - The Huron country is destroyed and fleeing Hurons are relocated to Île d'Orléans with the help of governor d'Ailleboust.

== 1650s ==
- 1651 - Jean de Lauzon becomes governor of New France.
- 1653 - The population of Quebec stands at 2,000.
- 1657 - Arrival of the Roman Catholic Sulpician Order in Montreal.
- 1657 - Pierre de Voyer d'Argenson replaces Jean de Lauzon as governor of New France.
- 1659 - François de Laval becomes the first bishop of New France.

== 1660-1661 ==
- 1660 - Dollard des Ormeaux dies at Long Sault on the Ottawa River.
- 1661 - Louis XIV puts his minister Jean-Baptiste Colbert in charge of reorganizing the administration of New France on March 16.
- 1661 - Pierre DuBois, Baron Davaugour, becomes governor of New France.

== Bibliography ==
- Whitcomb, Ed (2012). A Short History of Quebec. Ottawa: From Sea to Sea Enterprises. ISBN 978-0-9694667-8-9.

Preceded by 1534 to 1607	Timeline of Quebec history 1608 to 1662	Succeeded by 1663 to 1759
