= Timeline of Quebec history (beginnings–1533) =

This section of the Timeline of Quebec history concerns events through 1533.

== Prehistory ==
- ~10,000 BCE: Indigenous peoples begin settling in what is now Québec following glacial retreat, initially as nomadic hunter-gatherers.
- ~8,000 BCE: Early evidence of Paleo-Indians in southern Québec; these are the ancestors of later Eastern Woodlands peoples.
- ~3,000 BCE: Development of Archaic cultures in the St. Lawrence River Valley; increasing social complexity and use of regional trade networks.
- ~1,000 BCE: Woodland Period begins; Indigenous groups begin to practice horticulture (e.g., maize), create ceramics, and form complex societies.
- ~1000: Iroquoian-speaking peoples such as St. Lawrence Iroquoians are settled in large agricultural villages along the St. Lawrence River valley.
- ~1200: Algonquian-speaking groups, including the Innu and Algonquin, inhabit boreal forest regions north of the St. Lawrence, primarily as semi-nomadic hunters and fishers.
- ~1300: Inuit peoples expand into northern Québec (Nunavik), adapting to Arctic conditions and developing the Thule culture, ancestral to modern Inuit.

== 15th century ==
- ~1400 -
  - Mi’kmaq Grand Council established; a governing body with male representatives and a grand chief leads by consensus.
  - Blackfoot Confederacy emerges; a political structure organized around bands governed by consensus.
- ~1450 - Haudenosaunee Confederacy (Iroquois League) forms to resolve disputes among nations in the lower Great Lakes region, including parts of modern-day Quebec.
- 1492 - For the Queen of Castile (later, Spain), Christopher Columbus crosses the Atlantic Ocean.
- 1493 - The papal bull Inter Caetera (Doctrine of Discovery) decreed, granting European powers legal justification to claim lands in the Americas without Indigenous consent.
- 1497 - John Cabot reaches the island of Newfoundland, which he claims for England.

== 16th century ==
- ~1500 - Distinct Indigenous cultural regions are established in Québec: Eastern Woodlands (e.g., Mohawk, Huron-Wendat, Abenaki) in the south, Subarctic groups (e.g., Cree, Innu, Naskapi) in the boreal and taiga forests, and Arctic peoples (Inuit) in the far north.
- 1524 - Giovanni da Verrazzano, a Florentine in the service of the King Francis I of France explores the East coast of North America from Florida to Newfoundland as well as parts of New York Harbor. The French would take narrow land ports of the Boroughs Queens and Brooklyn from the upper and lower parts of the harbor until 1609 when the British and the Dutch take control of it from the French.
- 1525 and after - Basque fishermen and whalers regularly sail in the St. Lawrence estuary and the Saguenay River.

== See also ==
Preceded by –	Timeline of Quebec history Beginnings to 1533	Succeeded by 1534 to 1607
