= Timeline of New France history (1534–1607) =

This section of the timeline of New France history concerns the events between Jacques Cartier's first voyage and the foundation of the Quebec settlement by Samuel de Champlain.

== 1500-1589 ==
- 1534 - On July 24, Jacques Cartier plants a cross on the Gaspé Peninsula and claims it for France.
- 1535 - Cartier's expedition sails along the St. Lawrence River and stops in a little bay he names Baie Saint-Laurent on August 10.
- 1535 - On September 6, Cartier is the first European to discover L'Isle-aux-Coudres, Quebec.
- 1535 - Cartier continues to sail up the St. Lawrence to the village of Hochelaga on October 2.
- 1537 - On June 9, Pope Paul III proclaims that since the Sauvages (Indians) are real humans, they must receive the Roman Catholic faith.
- 1541 - Cartier builds the Charlesbourg-Royal fort, the first permanent European settlement in North America, near the confluence of the Rivière du Cap Rouge with the St. Lawrence.

== 1590s ==
- 1598 - Following the 1521 landing on Sable Island southeast of present-day Nova Scotia by the Portuguese, the French establish a settlement.

== 1600-1607 ==
- 1600 - Pierre de Chauvin de Tonnetuit founds a trading post at Tadoussac.
- 1603 - Samuel de Champlain takes possession of lands he calls (Newfoundland) and Acadie (Acadia).
- 1604 - Pierre Dugua, Sieur de Monts and Samuel de Champlain establish an ill-fated settlement on the lands of the Passamaquoddy Nation that they give the religious name of Île-Saint-Croix.
- 1605 - Dugua and Champlain move the settlement to Port Royal in the Mi'kmaq Nation lands in present-day Nova Scotia. See Acadia.
- 1606 - Marc Lescarbot put on the first European theatrical production in North America. It was called Le Théâtre de Neptune.
- 1607 - On May 14, Captain Christopher Newport founds the first English colony on lands of the Paspahegh Indians in what they called America: Jamestown, Virginia.

== See also ==
- New France
- French colonial empire
- Colonialism
- France

Preceded by Beginnings to 1533	Timeline of New France history in Quebec; 1534 to 1607	Succeeded by 1608 to 1662
