= Rivière du Moulin (Deschambault-Grondines) =

Watercourse in Portneuf, Québec, Canada

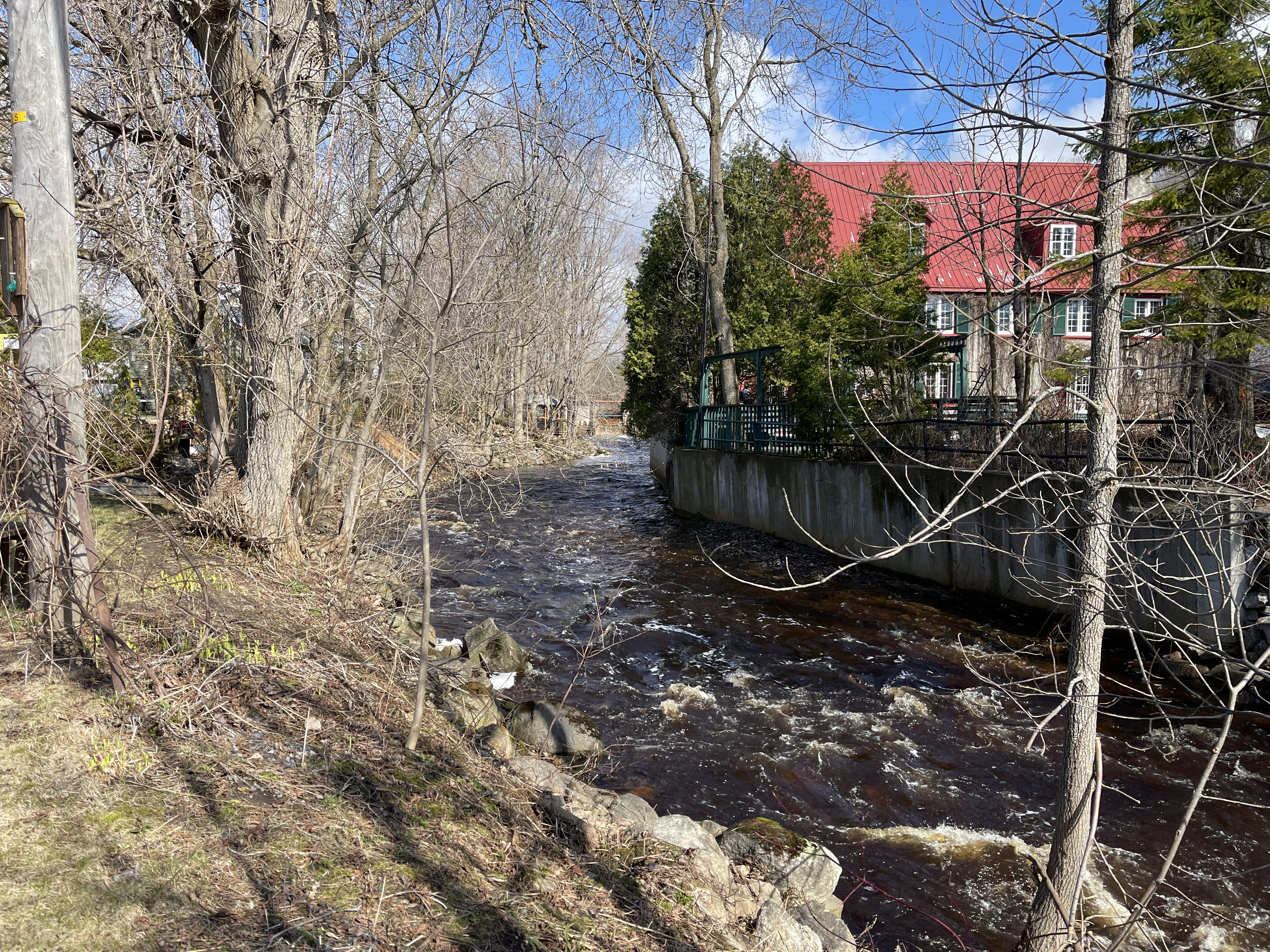
- River and Vieux moulin Hamelin (flour mill in the Faubourg), Grondines

- Location within Quebec

Location
- Country: Canada
- Province: Quebec
- Region: Capitale-Nationale
- Regional County Municipality: Portneuf Regional County Municipality
- Municipality: Deschambault-Grondines

Physical characteristics
- Source: Confluence of two streams
  - location: Portneuf
  - coordinates: 46.58667°N 72.05707°W
  - elevation: 38
- Mouth: Saint Lawrence River
  - location: Deschambault-Grondines
  - coordinates: 46.624422°N 72.07694°W
  - elevation: 5 m
- Length: 13.5 km (8.4 mi)

Basin features
- Tributaries
  - left: (Upward from the mouth) Unidentified stream
  - right: (Upward from the mouth) Rivière des Étangs, branche de la Savane Claire.

The rivière du Moulin is a tributary of the northwest shore of the Saint-Laurent river, descending in the municipality of Deschambault-Grondines, in the Portneuf Regional County Municipality, in the administrative region of Capitale-Nationale, in Quebec, in Canada.

The Moulin river valley is mainly served by the route 138 which runs along the northwest shore of the St. Lawrence River and the route 363 (route Guilbault) which is perpendicular to the north bank of the river.

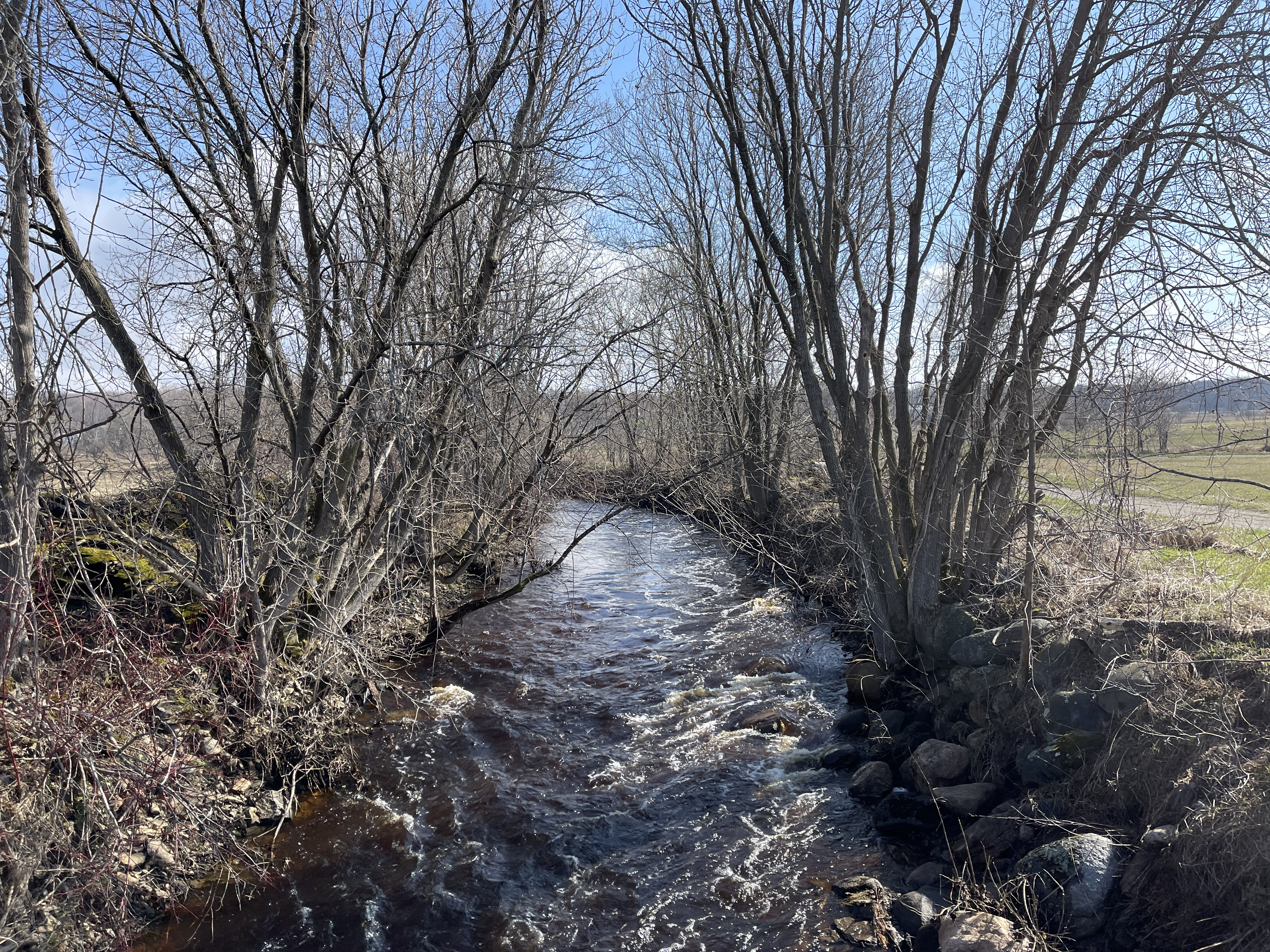
Rivière du Moulin in agricultural zone, Grondines (Sector)

Agriculture is the main economic activity in the sector; forestry, second.

The surface of the Moulin river (except the rapids areas) is generally frozen from the beginning of December to the end of March; however, safe circulation on the ice is generally from late December to early March. The water level of the river varies with the seasons and the precipitation; the spring flood occurs in March or April.

== Geography ==
The Rivière du Moulin is located on the north shore of the St. Lawrence River, between Trois-Rivières and Québec, more precisely between the hydrographic slopes of the Sainte-Anne River (to the west) and Portneuf River (to the east).

The Moulin river rises next to the Canadian Pacific railway. This source is located 4.0 kilometres (2.5 mi) west of the northwest shore of the St. Lawrence River; 5.9 kilometres (3.7 mi) south of the village center of Saint-Marc-des-Carrières; 13.9 kilometres (8.6 mi) north-east of the mouth of the Sainte-Anne River.

From its source, the Moulin river then flows over a distance of 13.5 kilometres (8.4 mi), with a drop of 33 metres (108 ft), according to the following segments:

- 5.1 kilometres (3.2 mi) first towards the west by cutting the Canadian Pacific railway, then branching south until the railway again;
- 8.4 kilometres (5.2 mi) to the southwest in the agricultural zone by crossing the autoroute 40, then route 138 in the village of Grondines-Ouest, to its mouth.

The confluence of the Moulin river is located on the sandstone 4.0 kilometres (2.5 mi) to the south-east of the railway; 9.3 kilometres (5.8 mi) south-east of the village center of Saint-Casimir; 10.3 kilometres (6.4 mi) north-east of the confluence of the Sainte-Anne River with the Saint-Laurent River; 13.4 kilometres (8.3 mi) south-west of the village center of Deschambault-Grondines.

== Toponymy ==
In Description topographique... du Bas Canada..., published in 1815, the geographer Joseph Bouchette, wrote about the seigneury of Grondines, that it was very well watered by the Sainte-Anne river, the Batiscan, and a small river that falls in the St. Lawrence. The latter runs a grain mill and a sawmill. Still unnamed in 1815, this small river certainly received the name it now bears from the mill it once fed.

The toponym "Rivière du Moulin" was formalized on December 5, 1968, at the Place Names Bank of the Commission de toponymie du Québec.

== See also ==
- List of rivers of Quebec
- Vieux moulin Hamelin (Faubourg flour mill) fr

== Bibliography ==
- CAPSA (2014). Plans directeurs de l’eau des secteurs d’intervention de la zone de gestion de la CAPSA: Sainte-Anne, Portneuf et La Chevrotière (Water master plans of the intervention sectors of the CAPSA management area: Sainte-Anne, Portneuf and La Chevrotière) (PDF) (in French). Quebec: CAPSA. p. 691. Archived from the original (PDF) on 2019-02-14.
