= Jacques David (court clerk) =

Jacques David (c. 1684 – 17 October 1726) was born in France and the first record of his presence in New France is from a wedding contract in 1715.

Jacques was acting court clerk in Montreal by 1718 and took over the registry there in 1719. The intendant of New France, Michel Bégon, also appointed him royal notary. He left an extensive record of all transactions during the time he operated the registry.
