= List of seignories of Quebec =

Seignories have existed in Québec from 1627 until the British conquest of New France in 1763 and continued in the British colony of the Province of Quebec (1763–1791), then in Lower Canada (1840) and in the Province of Canada until 1854.

The numbering is based on the below A.E.B. Courchene map.

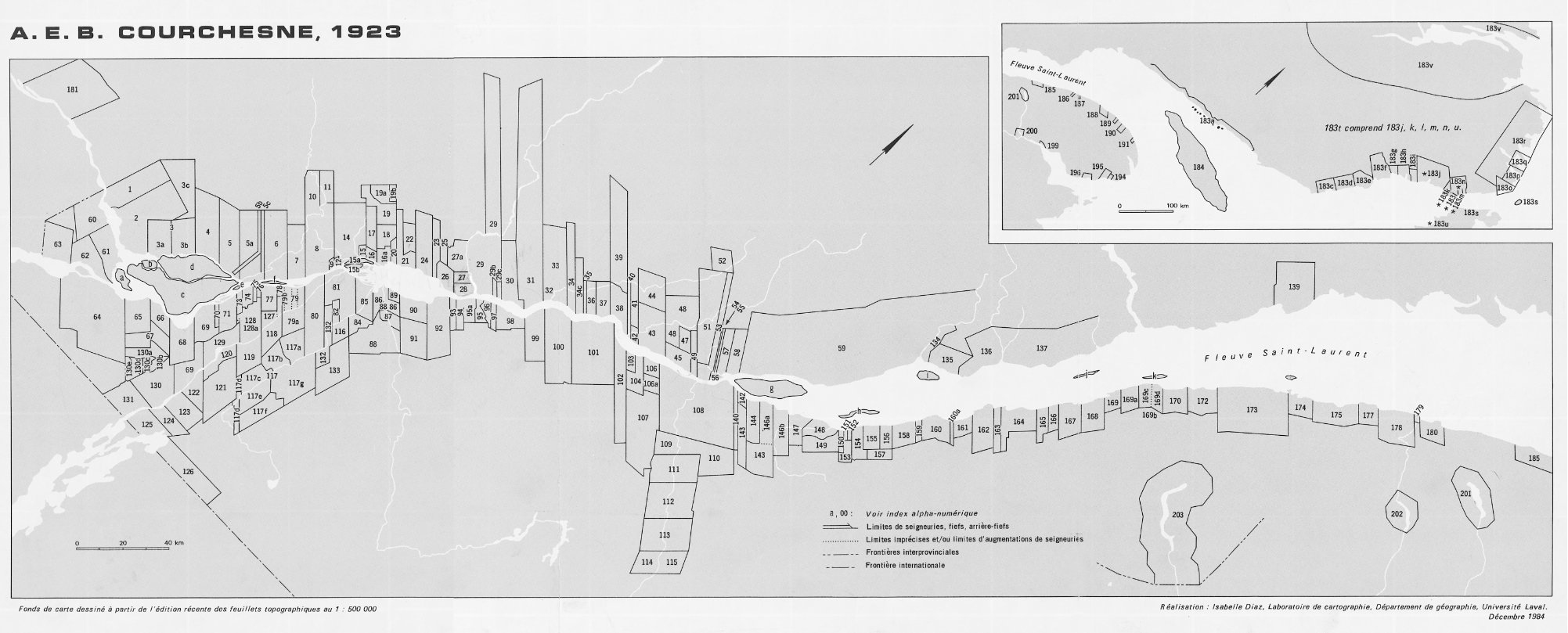

#	Name	Granter	Grant date	Region	Coordinates
10	Ailleboust	Charles de la Boische	1736	Lanaudière	46.183333333333°N 73.566666666667°W
191	Anse-de-l'Étang	Louis de Buade de Frontenac	1697	Gaspésie–Îles-de-la-Madeleine	49.116666666667°N 64.733333333333°W
12	Antaya	Jean Talon	1672	Lanaudière	46.05°N 73.2°W
1	Argenteuil	Louis de Buade de Frontenac	1680	Laurentides	45.633333333333°N 74.283333333333°W
114	Aubert-Gallion	Charles de la Boische	1736	Chaudière-Appalaches	46.083333333333°N 70.75°W
115	Aubin-De L'Isle	Charles de la Boische	1736	Chaudière-Appalaches	46.166666666667°N 70.616666666667°W
41	Auteuil	François-Christophe de Lévy	1649	Capitale-Nationale	46.75°N 71.833333333333°W
9	Autray	Henri de Lévis	1637	Lanaudière	46.033333333333°N 73.216666666667°W
90	Baie-Saint-Antoine	Joseph-Antoine Le Febvre de La Barre	1683	Centre-du-Québec	46.116666666667°N 72.666666666667°W
31	Batiscan	Henri de Lévis	1639	Mauricie	46.75°N 72.616666666667°W
64	Beauharnois	Victor Marie d'Estrées	1729	Montérégie	45.216666666667°N 73.916666666667°W
144	Beaumont	Jean Talon	1672	Chaudière-Appalaches	46.783333333333°N 70.916666666667°W
58	Beauport	Henri de Lévis	1634	Capitale-Nationale	46.933333333333°N 71.233333333333°W
95	Bécancour	François-Christophe de Lévy	1647	Centre-du-Québec	46.316666666667°N 72.433333333333°W
42	Bélair	Jean Talon	1672	Capitale-Nationale	46.7°N 71.75°W
147	Bellechasse	Charles Jacques Huault de Montmagny	1637	Chaudière-Appalaches	46.883333333333°N 70.7°W
3c	Bellefeuille	Jacques-Pierre de Taffanel de La Jonquière	1752	Laurentides	45.834194444444°N 74.009333333333°W
78	Bellevue	Jean Talon	1672	Montérégie	45.783333333333°N 73.283333333333°W
128	Beloeil	Jean Bochart de Champigny	1694	Montérégie	45.616666666667°N 73.266666666667°W
13; 14	Berthier	Jean Talon	1672	Lanaudière	46.166666666667°N 73.25°W
174	Bic	Louis de Buade de Frontenac	1675	Bas-Saint-Laurent	48.35°N 68.7°W
3b	Blainville	Philippe de Rigaud de Vaudreuil	1714	Laurentides	45.666666666667°N 73.866666666667°W
122	Bleury	Charles de la Boische	1733	Montérégie	45.216666666667°N 73.2°W
103	Bonsecours	Jean Talon	1672	Chaudière-Appalaches	46.6°N 71.616666666667°W
71	Boucherville	Godefroi d'Estrades	1664	Montérégie	45.6°N 73.4°W
44	Bourg-Louis	Charles de la Boische	1741	Capitale-Nationale	46.883333333333°N 71.85°W
84	Bourg-Marie-Est	George Ramsay	1822	Montérégie	45.95°N 72.883333333333°W
82	Bourg-Marie-Ouest	Matthew Whitworth-Aylmer	1835	Montérégie	45.9°N 72.966666666667°W
132	Bourgchemin	Louis de Buade de Frontenac	1695	Montérégie	45.783333333333°N 72.9°W
95a	Bruyères	Robert Prescott	1801	Centre-du-Québec	46.283333333333°N 72.466666666667°W
186	Cap-Chat	Jacques-René de Brisay	1688	Gaspésie–Îles-de-la-Madeleine	49.1°N 66.683333333333°W
29	Cap-de-la-Madeleine	Jacques de La Ferté	1651	Mauricie	46.716666666667°N 72.833333333333°W
193	Cap-des-Rosiers	François-Christophe de Lévy	1652	Gaspésie–Îles-de-la-Madeleine	48.666666666667°N 64.666666666667°W
74a	Cap-Saint-Michel	Daniel de Rémy de Courcelles	1668	Montérégie	45.7°N 73.383333333333°W
18	Carufel	Philippe de Rigaud de Vaudreuil	1705	Mauricie	46.266666666667°N 73.083333333333°W
120; 129	Chambly	Louis de Buade de Frontenac	1672	Montérégie	45.477638888889°N 73.274516666667°W
120	Chambly-Est	Victor Marie d'Estrées	1714	Montérégie	45.45°N 73.233333333333°W
129	Chambly-Ouest	Victor Marie d'Estrées	1714	Montérégie	45.5°N 73.3°W
30	Champlain	Augustin de Saffray de Mézy	1664	Mauricie	46.533333333333°N 72.45°W
65	Châteauguay	Louis de Buade de Frontenac	1673	Montérégie	45.3°N 73.716666666667°W
200	Cloridan	Philippe de Rigaud de Vaudreuil	1707	Gaspésie–Îles-de-la-Madeleine	48.05°N 67°W
79	Contrecœur	Jean Talon	1672	Montérégie	45.816666666667°N 73.233333333333°W
59	Côte-de-Beaupré	Henri de Lévis	1636	Capitale-Nationale	47.305°N 70.889°W
97	Cournoyer	François-Christophe de Lévy	1647	Centre-du-Québec	46.333333333333°N 72.333333333333°W
127	Cournoyer	Louis de Buade de Frontenac	1695	Montérégie	45.716666666667°N 73.216666666667°W
91	Courval	Michel-Ange Duquesne de Menneville	1754	Centre-du-Québec	46.066666666667°N 72.583333333333°W
117c	Debartzch	George Prevost	1811	Montérégie	45.466666666667°N 73.033333333333°W
88	Deguire	Jacques-Pierre de Taffanel de La Jonquière	1751	Centre-du-Québec	45.933333333333°N 72.75°W
117b	Delorme	George Prevost	1811	Montérégie	45.583333333333°N 73.05°W
100	Deschaillons	Louis de Buade de Frontenac	1674	Centre-du-Québec	46.45°N 72°W
37	Deschambault	Henri de Lévis	1640	Capitale-Nationale	46.716666666667°N 72°W
117g	Dessaulles	Edmund Walker Head	1861	Montérégie	45.6°N 72.883333333333°W
17	Du Sablé	François-Christophe de Lévy	1649	Mauricie	46.216666666667°N 73.183333333333°W
70	Du Tremblay	Jean Talon	1672	Montérégie	45.55°N 73.35°W
24	Dumontier	Philippe de Rigaud de Vaudreuil	1708	Mauricie	46.383333333333°N 72.966666666667°W
105	Duquet	Jean Talon	1672	Chaudière-Appalaches	46.616666666667°N 71.583333333333°W
96	Dutort	Henri de Lévis	1637	Centre-du-Québec	46.333333333333°N 72.366666666667°W
135	Éboulements	Joseph-Antoine Le Febvre de La Barre	1683	Capitale-Nationale	47.5°N 70.35°W
48	Fossambault	Louis de Buade de Frontenac	1693	Capitale-Nationale	46.833333333333°N 71.6°W
125	Foucault	Charles de la Boische	1733	Montérégie	45.066666666667°N 73.25°W
150	Fournier	Jean Talon	1672	Chaudière-Appalaches	46.95°N 70.45°W
151	Gagné	Jean Talon	1672	Chaudière-Appalaches	47.016666666667°N 70.45°W
152	Gamache	Jean Talon	1672	Chaudière-Appalaches	47.033333333333°N 70.45°W
106a	Gaspé	Charles de la Boische	1738	Chaudière-Appalaches	46.6°N 71.45°W
25	Gastineau	Jean Talon	1672	Mauricie	46.283333333333°N 72.833333333333°W
49	Gaudarville	Jean de Lauzon	1652	Capitale-Nationale	46.8°N 71.416666666667°W
98	Gentilly	François-Christophe de Lévy	1647	Centre-du-Québec	46.383333333333°N 72.25°W
94	Godefroy	Henri de Lévis	1637	Centre-du-Québec	46.25°N 72.5°W
195	Grand-Pabos	Louis de Buade de Frontenac	1696	Gaspésie–Îles-de-la-Madeleine	48.416666666667°N 64.7°W
160	Grande-Anse	Jean de Lauzon	1656	Chaudière-Appalaches	47.283333333333°N 70.116666666667°W
194	Grande-Rivière	Louis de Buade de Frontenac	1697	Gaspésie–Îles-de-la-Madeleine	48.433333333333°N 64.516666666667°W
190	Grande-Vallée-des-Monts	Louis de Buade de Frontenac	1691	Gaspésie–Îles-de-la-Madeleine	49.166666666667°N 65.133333333333°W
22	Grandpré	Louis de Buade de Frontenac	1695	Mauricie	46.3°N 73.016666666667°W
165	Granville	Philippe de Rigaud de Vaudreuil	1707	Bas-Saint-Laurent	47.583333333333°N 69.7°W
167	Granville-et-De La Chesnaye	Louis de Buade de Frontenac	1696	Bas-Saint-Laurent	47.683333333333°N 69.6°W
32; 34	Grondines	Henri de Lévis	1637	Capitale-Nationale	46.733333333333°N 72.1°W
34	Grondines-Est	Louis de Buade de Frontenac	1698	Capitale-Nationale	46.683333333333°N 72.116666666667°W
32	Grondines-Ouest	Jean Bochart de Champigny	1694	Capitale-Nationale	46.75°N 72.3°W
23	Grosbois	François-Christophe de Lévy	1653	Mauricie	46.316666666667°N 72.833333333333°W
23b	Grosbois-Est	Jean Bochart de Champigny	1693	Mauricie	46.316666666667°N 72.816666666667°W
23a	Grosbois-Ouest	Jean Bochart de Champigny	1693	Mauricie	46.316666666667°N 72.883333333333°W
47	Guillaume-Bonhomme	Jacques de Meulles	1682	Capitale-Nationale	46.8°N 71.483333333333°W
29c	Hertel	Henri de Lévis	1633	Mauricie	46.45°N 72.416666666667°W
52	Hubert	Louis de Buade de Frontenac	1698	Capitale-Nationale	47.216666666667°N 71.716666666667°W
	Île-au-Ruau	Henri de Lévis	1637	Capitale-Nationale	47.016666666667°N 70.733333333333°W
i	Île-aux-Coudres	Jacques-René de Brisay	1687	Capitale-Nationale	47.4°N 70.366666666667°W
h	Île-aux-Grues	Henri de Lévis	1646	Chaudière-Appalaches	47.066666666667°N 70.55°W
j	Île-aux-Lièvres	Jean Talon	1672	Bas-Saint-Laurent	47.847222222222°N 69.734444444444°W
h	Île-aux-Oies	François-Christophe de Lévy	1646	Chaudière-Appalaches	47.116666666667°N 70.483333333333°W
	Île-Beauregard	Louis de Buade de Frontenac	1674	Montérégie	45.75°N 73.416666666667°W
b	Île-Bizard	Louis de Buade de Frontenac	1678	Montréal	45.483333333333°N 73.9°W
184	Île-d'Anticosti	Jacques Duchesneau de la Doussinière et d'Ambault	1680	Côte-Nord	49.5°N 63°W
c	Île-de-Montréal	Marc Antoine Jacques Bras-de-fer de Châteaufort	1636	Montréal	45.5°N 73.666666666667°W
g	Île-d'Orléans	Henri de Lévis	1636	Capitale-Nationale	46.916666666667°N 70.966666666667°W
15; 15a	Île-Dupas-et-du-Chicot	Jean Talon	1672	Lanaudière	46.116666666667°N 73.116666666667°W
d	Île-Jésus	Jean Talon	1636	Laval	45.583333333333°N 73.75°W
a	Île-Perrot	Louis de Buade de Frontenac	1672	Montérégie	45.366666666667°N 73.95°W
e	Île-Sainte-Thérèse	Jean Talon	1672	Montérégie	45.683333333333°N 73.466666666667°W
169k	Île-Verte	Joseph-Antoine Le Febvre de La Barre	1684	Bas-Saint-Laurent	48.05°N 69.266666666667°W
f	Îles-Bouchard	Jean Talon	1672	Lanaudière	45.816666666667°N 73.35°W
5a	Îles-Bourdon	Jean de Lauzon	1657	Lanaudière	45.716666666667°N 73.483333333333°W
c	Îles-Courcelles	Louis de Buade de Frontenac	1673	Laval	45.593319444444°N 73.719636111111°W
204	Îles-de-la-Madeleine	Pierre du Bois d'Avaugour	1663	Gaspésie–Îles-de-la-Madeleine	47.4°N 61.8°W
183b	Îles-et-Îlets-de-Mingan	Jacques Duchesneau de la Doussinière et d'Ambault	1679	Côte-Nord	50.216666666667°N 63.833333333333°W
15b	Îles-Saint-Pierre	Louis de Buade de Frontenac	1674	Montérégie	46.1°N 73.033333333333°W
166	Îlet-du-Portage	Jean Talon	1672	Bas-Saint-Laurent	47.616666666667°N 69.666666666667°W
159	Îlet-à-la-Peau	Louis de Buade de Frontenac	1677	Chaudière-Appalaches	47.233333333333°N 70.216666666667°W
40	Jacques-Cartier	Louis d'Ailleboust de Coulonge	1649	Capitale-Nationale	46.75°N 71.833333333333°W
28a	Jésuites	Samuel de Champlain	1634	Mauricie	46.3°N 72.583333333333°W
110	Jolliet	Louis de Buade de Frontenac	1697	Chaudière-Appalaches	46.583333333333°N 70.966666666667°W
164	Kamouraska	Louis de Buade de Frontenac	1674	Bas-Saint-Laurent	47.533333333333°N 69.816666666667°W
5c	L'Assomption	Charles Jacques Huault de Montmagny	1647	Laurentides	45.833333333333°N 73.833333333333°W
5	La Chesnaye	Charles Jacques Huault de Montmagny	1647	Lanaudière	45.716666666667°N 73.683333333333°W
36	La Chevrotière	Jean Talon	1672	Capitale-Nationale	46.7°N 72.05°W
146	La durantaye	Jean Talon	1672	Chaudière-Appalaches	46.850066666667°N 70.870055555556°W
75	La Guillaudière	Jean Talon	1672	Montérégie	45.716666666667°N 73.366666666667°W
89	La Lussaudière	Jean Talon	1672	Centre-du-Québec	46.116666666667°N 72.816666666667°W
29-36	La Madeleine	Henri de Lévis	1636	Mauricie; Capitale-Nationale	
140	La Martinière	Louis de Buade de Frontenac	1692	Chaudière-Appalaches	46.75°N 70.966666666667°W
8	La Noraye	Jean Talon	1672	Lanaudière	46.05°N 73.35°W
181	La Petite-Nation	Louis de Buade de Frontenac	1674	Outaouais	45.75°N 74.933333333333°W
161	La Pocatière	Jean Talon	1672	Bas-Saint-Laurent	47.383333333333°N 70°W
67	La Salle	Jacques-Pierre de Taffanel de La Jonquière	1750	Montérégie	45.283333333333°N 73.6°W
28	Labadie	Daniel de Rémy de Courcelles	1670	Mauricie	46.338973°N 72.549934°W
2	Lac-des-Deux-Montagnes	Philippe de Rigaud de Vaudreuil	1717	Laurentides	45.633333333333°N 74.083333333333°W
201	Lac-Matapédia	Louis de Buade de Frontenac	1694	Bas-Saint-Laurent	48.55°N 67.55°W
202	Lac-Mitis	Jean Bochart de Champigny	1693	Bas-Saint-Laurent	48.283333333333°N 67.75°W
131	Lacolle	Charles de la Boische	1733	Montérégie	45.133333333333°N 73.416666666667°W
19	Lanaudière	Jacques-Pierre de Taffanel de La Jonquière	1750	Mauricie	46.3°N 73.2°W
108	Lauzon	Henri de Lévis	1636	Chaudière-Appalaches	46.633333333333°N 71.15°W
7	Lavaltrie	Jean Talon	1672	Lanaudière	45.933333333333°N 73.4°W
104	Legardeur-Belle-Plaine	Charles de la Boische	1737	Chaudière-Appalaches	46.601219444444°N 71.523741666667°W
178	Lepage-et-Thibierge	Jean Bochart de Champigny	1696	Bas-Saint-Laurent	48.55°N 68.2°W
169a	Leparc	Louis de Buade de Frontenac	1673	Bas-Saint-Laurent	47.9°N 69.416666666667°W
149	Lespinay	Hector de Callière	1701	Chaudière-Appalaches	46.916666666667°N 70.533333333333°W
54	Lespinay	Henri de Lévis	1626	Capitale-Nationale	46.883333333333°N 71.316666666667°W
157	Lessard	Louis de Buade de Frontenac	1698	Chaudière-Appalaches	47.05°N 70.25°W
177	Lessard	Jean Bochart de Champigny	1696	Bas-Saint-Laurent	48.483333333333°N 68.4°W
99	Lévrard	Jean Talon	1672	Centre-du-Québec	46.433333333333°N 72.116666666667°W
156	L'Islet	Louis de Buade de Frontenac	1677	Chaudière-Appalaches	47.116666666667°N 70.283333333333°W
155	L'Islet-de-Bonsecours	Louis de Buade de Frontenac	1677	Chaudière-Appalaches	47.066666666667°N 70.366666666667°W
143	Livaudière	Charles de la Boische	1736	Chaudière-Appalaches	46.733333333333°N 70.916666666667°W
69	Longueuil	François-Christophe de Lévy	1657	Montérégie	45.4°N 73.35°W
101	Lotbinière	Jean Talon	1672	Chaudière-Appalaches	46.533333333333°N 71.85°W
203	Madawaska	Joseph-Antoine Le Febvre de La Barre	1683	Bas-Saint-Laurent	47.7°N 68.7°W
29b	Marsolet	Jacques de La Ferté	1644	Mauricie	46.383333333333°N 72.433333333333°W
117	Maska	François Bigot	1748	Montérégie	45.619444444444°N 72.958333333333°W
16	Maskinongé	Jean Talon	1672	Mauricie	46.2°N 73.033333333333°W
185	Matane	Jean Talon	1672	Bas-Saint-Laurent	48.833333333333°N 67.483333333333°W
45	Maur	Charles Jacques Huault de Montmagny	1647	Capitale-Nationale	46.766666666667°N 71.466666666667°W
3	Mille-Îles	Joseph-Antoine Le Febvre de La Barre	1683	Laurentides	45.616666666667°N 74.05°W
139	Mille-Vaches	Jean de Lauzon	1653	Côte-Nord	48.666666666667°N 69.216666666667°W
183a	Mingan	Pierre du Bois d'Avaugour	1661	Côte-Nord	50.316666666667°N 63.616666666667°W
180	Mitis	Louis de Buade de Frontenac	1675	Bas-Saint-Laurent	48.616666666667°N 68°W
117a	Mondelet	Charles Murray Cathcart	1846	Montérégie	45.433333333333°N 72.95°W
121	Monnoir	Philippe de Rigaud de Vaudreuil	1708	Montérégie	45.383333333333°N 73.116666666667°W
188	Mont-Louis	Louis de Buade de Frontenac	1691	Gaspésie–Îles-de-la-Madeleine	49.183333333333°N 65.7°W
72	Montarville	Philippe de Rigaud de Vaudreuil	1710	Montérégie	45.533333333333°N 73.35°W
137	Mount Murray	James Murray	1762	Capitale-Nationale	47.783333333333°N 70.083333333333°W
136	Murray Bay	James Murray	1762	Capitale-Nationale	47.633333333333°N 70.25°W
43	Neuville	Jean de Lauzon	1653	Capitale-Nationale	46.766666666667°N 71.666666666667°W
173	Nicolas-Rioux	Louis d'Ailleboust de Coulonge	1751	Bas-Saint-Laurent	48.233333333333°N 68.75°W
92	Nicolet	Jean Talon	1672	Centre-du-Québec	46.2°N 72.516666666667°W
28b	Niverville	Pierre de Voyer d'Argenson, Vicomte de Mouzay	1660	Mauricie	46.35°N 72.533333333333°W
57	Notre-Dame-des-Anges	Henri de Lévis	1626	Capitale-Nationale	46.833333333333°N 71.283333333333°W
63	Nouvelle-Longueuil	Charles de la Boische	1734	Montérégie	45.283333333333°N 74.35°W
124	Noyan	Charles de la Boische	1733	Montérégie	45.116666666667°N 73.166666666667°W
55	Orsainville	Jean Bochart de Champigny	1694	Capitale-Nationale	46.9°N 71.316666666667°W
14	Orvilliers	Jean Talon	1672	Lanaudière	46.05°N 73.2°W
29	Pachirini	Charles Jacques Huault de Montmagny	1648	Mauricie	46.366666666667°N 72.533333333333°W
179	Pachot	Jacques-René de Brisay	1689	Bas-Saint-Laurent	48.616666666667°N 68.15°W
197	Paspébiac	Philippe de Rigaud de Vaudreuil	1707	Gaspésie–Îles-de-la-Madeleine	48.083333333333°N 65.333333333333°W
39	Perthuis	Michel-Ange Duquesne de Menneville	1753	Capitale-Nationale	46.833333333333°N 72.2°W
	Petit-Bruno	Jacques-René de Brisay	1686	Lanaudière	46.166666666667°N 73.083333333333°W
87	Pierreville	Joseph-Antoine Le Febvre de La Barre	1683	Centre-du-Québec	46.05°N 72.766666666667°W
4a	Plaines	Charles de la Boische	1737	Chaudière-Appalaches	46.583333333333°N 71.533333333333°W
26	Pointe-du-Lac	Pierre Boucher	1656	Mauricie	46.3°N 72.7°W
196	Port-Daniel	Louis de Buade de Frontenac	1696	Gaspésie–Îles-de-la-Madeleine	48.216666666667°N 64.916666666667°W
158	Port-Joly	Louis de Buade de Frontenac	1677	Chaudière-Appalaches	47.183333333333°N 70.25°W
38	Portneuf	François-Christophe de Lévy	1647	Capitale-Nationale	46.733333333333°N 71.883333333333°W
68	Prairie-de-la-Madeleine	Jean de Lauzon	1647	Montérégie	45.383333333333°N 73.45°W
11	Ramezay	Charles de la Boische	1736	Lanaudière	46.25°N 73.533333333333°W
133	Ramezay	Philippe de Rigaud de Vaudreuil	1710	Montérégie	45.75°N 72.783333333333°W
	Récollets	Louis XIII	1615	Capitale-Nationale	46.766666666667°N 71.266666666667°W
60	Rigaud	Charles de la Boische	1732	Montérégie	45.45°N 74.333333333333°W
115	Rigaud-De Vaudreuil	Charles de la Boische	1736	Chaudière-Appalaches	46.233333333333°N 70.733333333333°W
175; 176	Rimouski	Jacques-René de Brisay	1623	Bas-Saint-Laurent	48.416666666667°N 68.533333333333°W
192	Rivière-au-Griffon	Charles Jacques Huault de Montmagny	1636	Gaspésie–Îles-de-la-Madeleine	48.915833333333°N 64.334444444444°W
198	Rivière-Bonaventure	Louis de Buade de Frontenac	1697	Gaspésie–Îles-de-la-Madeleine	48.047777777778°N 65.459166666667°W
189	Rivière-de-la-Madeleine	Louis de Buade de Frontenac	1679	Gaspésie–Îles-de-la-Madeleine	49.216666666667°N 65.316666666667°W
3a	Rivière-du-Chêne	Victor Marie d'Estrées	1718	Laurentides	45.577575°N 74.071616666667°W
134	Rivière-du-Gouffre	Joseph-Antoine Le Febvre de La Barre	1682	Capitale-Nationale	47.516666666667°N 70.5°W
169	Rivière-du-Loup	Louis de Buade de Frontenac	1673	Bas-Saint-Laurent	47.8°N 69.516666666667°W
21	Rivière-du-Loup	Jean Talon	1672	Mauricie	46.266666666667°N 73.033333333333°W
148h	Rivière-du-Sud	Charles Jacques Huault de Montmagny	1646	Chaudière-Appalaches	46.95°N 70.583333333333°W
162	Rivière-Ouelle	Jean Talon	1672	Bas-Saint-Laurent	47.433333333333°N 69.916666666667°W
93	Roquetaillade	Louis de Buade de Frontenac	1675	Centre-du-Québec	46.233333333333°N 72.516666666667°W
119	Rouville	Louis de Buade de Frontenac	1694	Montérégie	45.55°N 73.15°W
123	Sabrevois	Charles de la Boische	1733	Montérégie	45.2°N 73.15°W
126	Saint-Armand	Rolland-Michel Barrin	1748	Montérégie	45.05°N 72.883333333333°W
76	Saint-Blaint	Jacques-René de Brisay	1686	Montérégie	45.716666666667°N 73.35°W
118	Saint-Charles	Louis de Buade de Frontenac	1695	Montérégie	45.65°N 73.166666666667°W
116	Saint-Charles-de-Yamaska	Hector de Callière	1701	Montérégie	45.866666666667°N 72.883333333333°W
79a	Saint-Denis	Louis de Buade de Frontenac	1694	Montérégie	45.75°N 73.133333333333°W
163	Saint-Denis-De La Bouteillerie	Louis de Buade de Frontenac	1679	Bas-Saint-Laurent	47.416666666667°N 69.833333333333°W
109	Saint-Étienne	Charles de la Boische	1737	Chaudière-Appalaches	46.483333333333°N 71.15°W
27a	Saint-Étienne	Jean de Lauzon	1655	Mauricie	46.333333333333°N 72.75°W
56	Saint-François	Charles Jacques Huault de Montmagny	1639	Capitale-Nationale	46.8°N 71.25°W
86	Saint-François-du-Lac	Jean de Lauzon	1662	Centre-du-Québec	46.1°N 72.833333333333°W
51	Saint-Gabriel	Charles Jacques Huault de Montmagny	1647	Capitale-Nationale	46.95°N 71.5°W
130a	Saint-George	George Ramsay	1823	Montérégie	45.25°N 73.533333333333°W
107	Saint-Gilles	Charles de la Boische	1738	Chaudière-Appalaches	46.466666666667°N 71.283333333333°W
53	Saint-Ignace	Charles Jacques Huault de Montmagny	1647	Capitale-Nationale	46.95°N 71.416666666667°W
130d	Saint-James	George Ramsay	1824	Montérégie	45.183333333333°N 73.516666666667°W
56	Saint-Jean	Charles Jacques Huault de Montmagny	1637	Capitale-Nationale	46.783333333333°N 71.25°W
20	Saint-Jean	Hector de Callière	1701	Mauricie	46.266666666667°N 73°W
112	Saint-Joseph-de-Beauce	Charles de la Boische	1736	Chaudière-Appalaches	46.3°N 70.966666666667°W
27	Saint-Maurice	Jean Talon	1668	Mauricie	46.366666666667°N 72.65°W
146a	Saint-Michel	Charles de la Boische	1736	Chaudière-Appalaches	46.75°N 70.783333333333°W
80	Saint-Ours	Jean Talon	1672	Montérégie	45.833333333333°N 73.066666666667°W
183j	Saint-Paul	Philippe de Rigaud de Vaudreuil	1706	Côte-Nord	51.45°N 57.833333333333°W
6	Saint-Sulpice	Charles Jacques Huault de Montmagny	1640	Lanaudière	45.9°N 73.483333333333°W
146b	Saint-Vallier	Philippe de Rigaud de Vaudreuil	1720	Chaudière-Appalaches	46.833333333333°N 70.75°W
33	Sainte-Anne-de-la-Pérade	Jean Talon	1672	Mauricie	46.683333333333°N 72.416666666667°W
187	Sainte-Anne-des-Monts	Jacques-René de Brisay	1688	Gaspésie–Îles-de-la-Madeleine	49.116666666667°N 66.45°W
153	Sainte-Claire	Louis de Buade de Frontenac	1693	Chaudière-Appalaches	46.95°N 70.383333333333°W
102	Sainte-Croix	Charles Jacques Huault de Montmagny	1637	Chaudière-Appalaches	46.466666666667°N 71.516666666667°W
28	Sainte-Marguerite	Louis de Buade de Frontenac	1679	Mauricie	46.35°N 72.583333333333°W
32	Sainte-Marie	Daniel de Rémy de Courcelles	1669	Mauricie	46.5°N 72.266666666667°W
111	Sainte-Marie	Charles de la Boische	1736	Chaudière-Appalaches	46.45°N 71.033333333333°W
56	Sault-au-Matelot	Henri II de Montmorency	1623	Capitale-Nationale	46.813538888889°N 71.209516666667°W
66	Sault-Saint-Louis	Louis de Buade de Frontenac	1680	Montérégie	45.383333333333°N 73.633333333333°W
50	Sillery	Jacques-Pierre de Taffanel de La Jonquière	1651	Capitale-Nationale	46.766666666667°N 71.316666666667°W
81	Sorel	Jean Talon	1672	Montérégie	45.983333333333°N 73.1°W
62	Soulanges	Hector de Callière	1702	Montérégie	45.333333333333°N 74.166666666667°W
4	Terrebonne	Louis de Buade de Frontenac	1673	Laurentides	45.766666666667°N 73.833333333333°W
	Thwaite	George Ramsay	1824	Montérégie	45.2°N 73.5°W
106	Tilly	Jean Talon	1672	Chaudière-Appalaches	46.657388888889°N 71.510011111111°W
172	Trois-Pistoles	Jacques-René de Brisay	1687	Bas-Saint-Laurent	48.066666666667°N 69.166666666667°W
73	Varennes	Jean Talon	1672	Montérégie	45.616666666667°N 73.416666666667°W
61	Vaudreuil	Hector de Callière	1702	Montérégie	45.416666666667°N 74.166666666667°W
168	Verbois	Louis de Buade de Frontenac	1673	Bas-Saint-Laurent	47.75°N 69.533333333333°W
77	Verchères	Jean Talon	1672	Montérégie	45.75°N 73.3°W
28	Vieuxpont	François-Christophe de Lévy	1649	Mauricie	46.316966°N 72.564955°W
154	Vincelotte	Louis de Buade de Frontenac	1672	Chaudière-Appalaches	47.016666666667°N 70.383333333333°W
142	Vincennes	Jean Talon	1672	Chaudière-Appalaches	46.816666666667°N 71.066666666667°W
85	Yamaska	Joseph-Antoine Le Febvre de La Barre	1683	Montérégie	46.033333333333°N 72.95°W

== See also ==
- Intendant of New France
- Governor of New France
- Governor of Lower Canada
- Seigneurial system in Quebec
- Seigneurial system of New France
