= Alcohol in New France =

The history of New France as a colonial space is inextricably linked to the trade and commerce of alcohol. Whether it is the use of brandy as a commodity in the fur trade, the local consumption of spirits and beer by the colonists at home and in the cabarets, or the wine used in religious ceremonies, its presence was ubiquitous and was one of the staples of the economy. The King, Sovereign Council, and ecclesiastics were very concerned over the commerce of this substance and took several measures to regulate the trade over the course of the colonies' existence.

== Types of alcohol ==
=== Wine ===
Year	Wine imports (litres)
1700	761,400
1705	149,400
1710	51,300
1715	189,000
1720	325,125
1725	428,850
1730	508,050
1735	650,475
1740	866,925
1745	-
1750	1,261,125

From the very first arrivals, French explorers and settlers of Canada observed with great interest the grapes they found growing natively in the Saint Lawrence Valley, often in the hope of producing wine with them. Indeed, in 1535, Jacques Cartier named what is today the Île d'Orléans "L'Île de Bacchus" for the grapes found there. Although in abundance and of formidable size, they were not as suitable for winemaking as European varieties, owing to a thickened skin evolved to cope with the harsh Canadian winter, which produced an acrid taste.

Local production of wine began nonetheless with Recollect and Jesuit missionaries needing to provide for religious ceremony, who found their imported supplies often close to depletion. The Sulpicians even attempted to make wine from imported French grapes. Such production was limited to religious purposes.

Attempts to domesticate local varieties, beginning with Samuel de Champlain in 1608, or to profitably cultivate imported French varieties, were largely unsuccessful. Aside from the aforementioned missionaries, production of Canadian wine in New France was non-existent. Consequently, colonists imported large quantities of wine from France, especially during the 18th century, with a strong preference for red wine.

During the 16th and 17th centuries, the preeminence of La Rochelle as the European point of departure to New France translated into a dominance of wines from Aunis and surrounding regions. However, rochelais merchants, receiving payment prior to shipment, were infamously lackadaisical, and wine from their port often arrived spoiled, even heavily diluted, much to the displeasure of Governor General Frontenac, who, in response, encouraged trade with other ports instead. The 18th century was marked by a huge shift to wines from Bordeaux and surrounding regions, carried on ships leaving from its ports: through the period 1700–1760, they accounted for 97% of wines inventoried in Quebec. Bordeaux wines were favoured, amongst other reasons, for their longevity, crossing the Atlantic without diminishing in quality. Towards the middle of the century, wines from regions all across France—Languedoc, Quercy, Cahors, Montauban, Domme, Gensac, Sainte-Foy, and Cognac, to name a few—were also making their passage to New France through Bordeaux, which greatly increased the colonists' variety of wines.

From the late-17th century, fortified wines imported from southern regions of Europe also featured prominently. Wines of the Muscat grape made up a majority of imports in this category, the most popular of which being frontignan. They were a luxury drink in which only wealthy Canadians could indulge.

=== Beer ===
Beer, on the other hand, was relatively easily brewed by settler families in their homes, as early as 1627, for their own supply. Even earlier, in 1620, the Recollects were producing beer at Notre-Dame-des-Anges. In 1635, the Jesuits began brewing, also mostly for their own consumption, and not for wider trade.

Production on a larger scale was soon to follow in the 1640s with the establishment of the brewery of the Communauté des habitants in Quebec; in 1648, Jacques Boisdon was granted the exclusive right to open an inn and to use the brewery for its supply of beer.

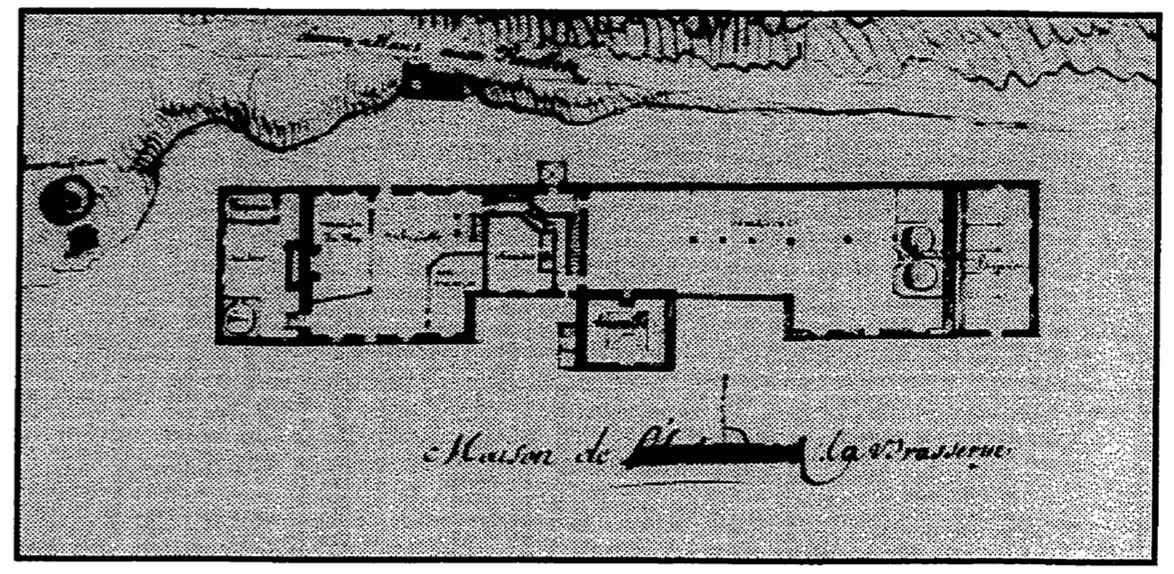
Plan of Jean Talon's brewery in 1686

Not long after his arrival in 1665, the first Intendant of New France Jean Talon put "his own money" towards a brewery in Quebec, in the hopes that state-driven production of beer would generate a local industry, reduce dependence on imported alcohol, ensure that excess grain was put to use, and reduce drunkenness of Canadians and Natives alike (beer being a 'weaker' alcohol). Roughly half of the annual production of around 800,000 litres was kept in Quebec, the other half being exported to the Antilles. Despite a promising start, the brewery closed permanently less than ten years after opening in 1668, its product unable to compete with domestic brewing and a rise in imports of other alcohols, and moreover, failing to be in sufficient demand from the small colonial population. Under French rule, there were no further attempts to create a state-owned brewery. Breweries at Montreal and Longueuil in the latter half of the 17th century and the first half of the 18th century, such as that at the Institut des frères Charon, were similarly short-lived.

Nonetheless, there was a relative abundance of inns (auberges) and liquor stores (cabarets), almost one for every one hundred inhabitants in Montreal and Quebec, often operated out of a family's home as a secondary source of income.

Over the course of the French Regime, censuses counted around twenty official brewers operating across Quebec, Trois-Rivières, and Montreal. While there is no pattern to their origins in France, a great number of their wives were from Normandy, a region with a rich history of brewing. It is suggested that the required skills were often passed on through females, who oversaw many indispensable brewing processes. They were, however, themselves unrecognised as brewers due to a prevailing patriarchy which limited the professional opportunities of women.

Commercial Canadian brewing would not truly take off until the arrival of John Molson in 1782 after cession of the colony at Canada to the English.

=== Eau-de-vie ===
Eau-de-vie, in French (plural: eaux-de-vie), refers to a broad category of beverages produced by fermentation and then distillation, and includes such common alcohols as brandy (wine grapes), whisky and vodka (grain), bourbon (maize), and rum (sugarcane).

While it remains unclear if there was any significant production of eaux-de-vie in Canada, records indicate that it was imported in considerable quantities from both France and the Antilles.

La Rochelle, Nantes, Bayonne, and Bordeaux were the major French ports to export eaux-de-vie to Canada, distilled from the wines of the corresponding regions, but also notably from Armagnac (through Bordeaux). Eaux-de-vie made using sugarcane, a plant incapable of withstanding boreal winters, was produced on and exported from the islands of Martinique, Guadeloupe, and Saint-Domingue. True inter-colonial exchange was taking place: on ships returning to the Antilles, Canadians sold flour, cod, vegetables, and lumber. As they were banned from importation into France from 1713 to 1777, these rums, tafias, and guildives found Canada as their primary destination market.

== Alcohol and the law ==
From the earliest years of the colonial establishment in New France alcohol was a contentious issue, often opposing members of the clergy with the Intendant and the habitants of the region. From the very beginning of the establishment of the Superior Council attempts were made to legislate the sale and consumption of the various types of alcohol available in the colony. Between 1663 and 1760, 78 edicts of the Superior Council of New France pertained to the sale and consumption of alcohol in the colony.

=== The Sovereign Council and the Church ===
Alcohol and its commerce in the colony was the subject of acrimonious debate between ecclesiastical interests, merchants and the government. "…the struggle over the sale of liquor to the Indians may be classed as the second cause for the erection of the Sovereign Council." In the early years of the colony ecclesiastics held a considerable amount of power. Bishop Laval, in the early 1660s obtained a law punishing the trade of brandy with natives with death which forced the newly arrived governor Avaugour to execute two offenders. The governor would quickly declare after another situation arose that no one should be punished for bartering liquor with the natives. This episode led Bishop Laval to sail for France and consult with the king. This meeting would be reflected in the composition of the Sovereign Council whose members would be jointly named by the Bishop and the Governor.

=== Alcohol in the fur trade ===
The trade of alcohol with the natives in New France was very profitable for European fur traders but caused ravages in indigenous communities. The first laws concerning the trade of alcohol with the natives appeared early in the history of New France. Samuel de Champlain first outlawed the sale and trade of alcohol with the natives in 1636. The first laws were aimed primarily at the French with the objective of cutting off the supply to the natives at the source. The punishment was often a fine, and in case of insolvability or repeat offense corporal punishment was applied. Natives who were found under the influence of alcohol would be retained until they gave up the name of the person who had given them the drink.

In 1668 under the Intendant Jean-Talon the Sovereign Council legalized the trade of alcohol with the natives for all French citizens at the same time as they made it illegal for natives to get drunk.

Finally edicts of 1669 and 1679 of the Sovereign Council made it so that trade in alcohol with the natives could not be carried out in their villages but was permitted only in French establishments.

=== Cabarets and the law ===
A cabaret in New France was any establishment that served alcoholic beverages. The major legislation of the Sovereign Council concerning the exploitation of cabarets was passed at two different times in the history of New France, The first set of legislation was passed in 1676, under Jacques Duchesneau de la Doussinière et d'Ambault and the second set in 1726 by Claude-Thomas Dupuy.

Edict of 1676
Under the laws of 1676 all owners of a cabaret had to be licensed by the Sovereign council. They could not extend credit nor serve alcohol after 9pm. It was forbidden at all times to drink to the point of inebriation (whether at a cabaret or elsewhere) Cabarettiers were also forbidden from serving drink to craftsmen and labourers while they were working. In each room where alcohol was served had to be displayed the rules concerning social mores (such as blasphemy, swearing and other public nuisances), as well as their punishments. The owner of a Cabaret also had a responsibility to report such behaviour himself or herself. Finally, they could not serve alcohol at any time during a religious ceremony and selling alcohol to natives was strictly forbidden.

Edict of 1726
Modifications brought to the laws in 1726 formalized the licensing of Cabarets and stipulated that they had to display their licences at all times they were open and required a second permit for those running hotels as well. The hour that alcohol could be served until was pushed back to 10pm (unless the client was lodging for the night). It was forbidden to serve alcohol in the bedrooms of said establishments. A ban on gambling and smoking was added. Soldiers, valets and domestic servants could not drink in a Cabaret without written permission from their employers. The modifications also made it so that cabarets became a cash only business by refusing cabaret owners the right to extend credit or accept any other form of payment. Finally, the sale and service of alcohol for immediate drink became reserved to Cabaret owners and the minimum quantities that could be sold by other merchants for take home purposes was clearly defined.

== Alcohol and indigenous societies ==
Trade and sale of alcohol to Indigenous peoples was an issue of controversy in New France. Prior to European presence in North America, aboriginal groups in what is now considered Canada were unfamiliar with the production and consumption of alcohol. Although historians have argued that brandy (eau de vie), rum, beer, wine, and whiskey were neither easily produced nor imported to the region, and would have thus been in limited supply, alcohol was certainly present in the colony and played a major role in trade and diplomacy with Native peoples. The French first introduced wine to Natives at Port Royal. Although skeptical at first, Natives eventually came to enjoy alcohol's inebriating effects. By 1634, Jesuits reported that drunkenness was common among the Montagnais, and in less than a decade, intoxicant use had spread to the Upper St. Lawrence and Great Lakes tribes. Mi'kmaq, Algonquin, Huron, Iroquois, and Odawa, as well as other Nations in Acadia and Western posts were similarly abusing alcohol by the latter half of the 17th century, according to missionary accounts.

Religious condemnations attempted to respond to the issue of Natives' alcohol abuse in the colony, with varying degrees of success. Although the majority of arriving Europeans identified with Christian cultural ideas and held certain moral views regarding alcohol consumption, Catholicism did not forbid alcohol consumption outright, but merely discouraged its excess and misuse. The Christian view held that alcohol abuse deprived families of a good living and inspired violence between men. Jesuit missionaries in New France frequently recognized that Aboriginal peoples had their own spiritual beliefs and practices, yet because the threat of eternal damnation and notion of temperance were not part of Native spiritual practices, Jesuits believed that Native peoples who used intoxicants were unable to abstain or control themselves, reinforcing the existing view that they were "savages." In 1636, Paul Le Jeune, a Jesuit missionary, reported in the Relations that excessive alcohol consumption was having a negative effect in the colony, especially among Natives. Murder, moral degradation, poverty, violence, and prostitution were viewed as some of the direct and indirect consequences of alcohol's obtainability, documented and condemned by missionary reports and further substantiated by traders and other Natives. By 1637, Le Jeune reported that alcohol abuse was rampant in Native communities, even among women and children. In response, missionaries, with support from some Aboriginal leaders, founded villages in which alcohol was banned. They pressured the Catholic Church to provide support by regulating alcohol, and in 1658, the Roman Catholic Church declared trading liquor with Indigenous peoples to be a mortal sin. Those who defied the Church and provided alcohol to Indigenous people could repent or else face excommunication. Religious correctional efforts, many of which were conducted by Bishop François de Montmorency-Laval, had short-lived success. Missionaries did their best to continue Native conversion efforts and assuage the ramifications of prevailing trade and commercial interests, but ecclesiastical representatives experienced difficulty without the full support of French Royal authorities. In 1713 the priest-to-person ratio was 1:83 in urban areas, and only 1:289 in the rest of the colony. Many parishes had no resident priest. Jacques Duchesneau de la Doussinière et d'Ambault, Intendant from 1675 to 1682, agreed with Jesuits that alcohol was the "obstacle to religion" that contributed to the destruction of Native societies. Yet he also acknowledged the dilemma of attempting to combat the issue in consideration of the distance.

Overall, efforts to regulate and even prohibit the trading of alcohol with Natives varied. Samuel de Champlain had banned the use of alcohol in trade practices with Natives as early as 1621. By 1636, state officials required that intoxicated Natives provide the name of the person who had sold the liquor, so that the individual could be fined. By 1663, French Royal authorities prohibited the use of eau de vie, most commonly used in trade. Although Aboriginal population decline in the latter half of the 17th century cannot solely be attributed to the ineffectiveness of alcohol regulations, Governor Denonville blamed brandy overconsumption for Native susceptibility to physical decline and illness.

Other attempts to regulate and curtail Native access to alcohol involved price and licensing restrictions, typically in urban areas. In Montreal and Quebec City, intoxicated Natives could be fined or jailed. In 1679, a Royal ordinance declared the carrying and selling of brandy to Native villages illegal, however Natives could still purchase alcohol legally in French settlements. As of 1710, ten establishments could legally sell only to non-Natives, while nine were licensed to sell to Natives and non-Natives alike. These restrictions actually did little to combat public drunkenness and social problems in Native communities, and eventually the policy was reversed. Regardless of state limitations, attempts to curtail alcohol use were generally ineffective, due to other political and economic factors at play. If French fur traders refused to supply brandy, Natives threatened to bring their furs to the British, so the French frequently refused to heed state restrictions in order to secure economic and political partnership. Missionaries and Intendants argued that trade relations suffered nonetheless, as inebriated Natives were poor hunters and provided fewer pelts, but authorities were unwilling to offer full military support to enforce alcohol restrictions for fear of losing essential trade networks.

When the Superior Council officially prohibited the trade or sale of intoxicants to Aboriginals, illegal operations supplied alcohol. Traders, coureurs de bois, and even soldiers peddled alcohol without much repercussion, especially in Western posts such as Michilimackinac, where Frontenac, Governor at the time, eventually allowed liquor sales. Representatives of both church and state frequently disputed over the liquor issue in matters of trade with Aboriginal allies. Compliance in view of the royal ordinance varied depending on colonial governing and administrative powers of the time. In 1721, Intendant Michel Bégon renewed prohibition, but by 1732, Governor Beauharnois viewed punishment for illicit alcohol use as unrealistic, and argued again that colonial trade suffered as a result. The Church continued to attempt to fight the use of alcohol in trade, but could not obtain jurisdiction where matters of colonial economics were concerned.

=== Consumption and behaviours ===
Though all native peoples were not using alcohol, there was significant use among the population. They themselves did not document the use of alcohol, however we have many accounts from missionaries who were involved with native peoples during the time of New France, most notably the Jesuits, in their first hand accounts and observations in the Jesuit Relations. These documents tell us how natives handled the introduction of alcohol into their societies. The Jesuits and other missionaries saw first hand the detrimental affects that alcohol was having on the native population, and were staunch supporters in having the alcohol trade banned. They believed that the alcohol trade led to innumerable social conflicts, "murders, violations, and monstrous unheard-of crimes" to the point that many native groups also wanted the trade stopped.

Though the stereotype of the "drunken Indian" held strong throughout much of the colonies existence and beyond, native practices involving alcohol had other uses beyond drinking to get intoxicated. Natives introduced new words and terminology to refer to drinking; this was due to a need to understand the powerful affects that alcohol had on the body. They were attempting to create rules for drinking, where even drinking to the point of unconsciousness sometimes made logical sense. There were a range of situations where they chose to drink, but this often varied from group to group. Some native societies chose to integrate liquor into religious rituals, while others for political or social ones. Natives in eastern North America attempted to integrate alcohol into existing ceremonies, such as hospitality and mourning rituals; some also wanted liquor for marriages and ceremonial dances, and as well for its ability to help dull pain. Others would use alcohol in spiritual and psychological quests, using the disorientation it caused to achieve a greater sense of personal power. Many natives drank for the following three reasons; first they valued the sense of power that alcohol induced; second, they used alcohol in hospitality rituals; and third, they relied on liquor for mourning ceremonies. Additionally, Natives often shared the assumption that a man who turned violent after consuming alcohol could not be held accountable for his actions. This suggests that they saw alcohol as a powerful substance that could not always be controlled. This meant that murder committed while under the influence exonerated an individual from the crime, and protected them from the relatives of the victim seeking revenge. Natives argued that it was alcohol that was the criminal, not the man. This led to a number of different practices: first, individuals would get highly intoxicated then seek out enemies or people whom they held grudges against, and commit violent acts against them, often murder, without the fear of retribution. Secondly, if there was an individual marked by the community as a problem, they could be marked for death. One member of the community, generally a man, would be selected to get intoxicated, then once under the influence of alcohol they would start a fight with the miscreant and would kill them. This was a sort of punitive judicial system, which was solely able to function because the executioner was intoxicated, therefore freeing him from any acts of revenge or punishment for the killing.

Many observers that natives solely drank for the purpose of getting as drunk as possible, they believed that absolute drunkenness apparently conferred power to the drinker, and that inebriation was a desirable state. Furthermore, the most prominent and oft reported aspect of native consumption of alcohol, was their determination to drink to the point of heavy intoxication. François Vachon de Belmont, a Sulpician missionary, wrote extensively on Native alcohol consumption patterns. He argued that alcohol caused three basic changes in natives. First, it "enlivens their natural sluggishness, dispels their timidity, their sense of shame and inferiority." Second, alcohol would lead them to "undertake with vigor and bravado almost any evil action such as anger, vengeance, or impurity." Third, drunkenness provided natives with a "valid excuse for any evil which they commit in such a condition." A particular instance of native's desire to get as intoxicated as possible is highlighted by Belmont, when natives had a limited amount of alcohol, rather than share it out equally amongst their numbers as Europeans would do, they preferred to give it all to one person to drink to excess while the others remained sober. Natives saw alcohol as a type of medicine that had to be taken in a large quantity if the drinker were to derive any benefit from it. They would have no interest in drinking unless they had enough alcohol to become substantially intoxicated. Jesuit missionary Paul Le Jeune reported that having procured alcohol, Natives would sit and drink until the bottle was empty. Chrétien Le Clercq a Recollet missionary in New France, recognized that the central feature of native drinking was to become as intoxicated as possible. Claiming that they made it a principle of honour to gorge themselves and only drink to get intoxicated. He also emphasized the role of the traders, who would purposefully get their clients as intoxicated as possible in order to deceive them more easily and rid them of their reason, this was in order to obtain furs for next to nothing. He also claimed the traders were committing fraud twice over; due to the fact they watered down the brandy they were selling to the natives. A Jesuit is quoted as referring to alcohol as "a demon that robs (Indians) of their reason, and so inflames their passion that, after returning from the chase richly laden with beaver-skins, instead of furnishing their families with provisions, clothing, and other necessary supplies, they drink away the entire proceeds in one day and are forced to pass the winter in nakedness, famine, and all sorts of deprivation. The same Jesuit claimed that some natives even sold their children to purchase more alcohol. The social consequences of drinking included intoxicated children who beat their parents, young men who plied girls with alcohol and corrupted them while drunk, and countless acts of violence that often ended in fatalities. In 1720, one official, ignoring the horrors brought about by the liquor trade, noted that natives became more docile and submissive to the French once given liquor, and they would devote their energy to obtaining more furs. Well into the 18th century, this logic behind the alcohol trade persisted; intoxicated natives would sell their furs more cheaply than sober ones. The practice of the double fraud continued, with brandy being watered down by half, allowing the traders to profit heavily from the natives.

Eventually there was little hope of ever halting the trade as the natives themselves began to be involved; most notably the Assiniboine who became the vital link between native communities further west and European traders in the colony. This meant that by the early nineteenth century the alcohol trade was still growing and expanding ever further into the continent.

Although natives were fully aware that alcohol destroyed their communities, they continued to drink. Often the continuation of the practice was due to a deep-rooted depression permeating their society because of the omnipresence of death. This is not uncommon for groups facing profound and unsettling changes to their societies to drink heavily when alcohol is available (p83). Many natives drank to escape the world they occupied, or to reach a more desirable state of mind, alcohol seemingly gave them temporary power and control over their lives once more. However the trade was still ravaging native communities, and the psychological effects were having a deep impact on their way of life. Three anonymous reports by missionaries in 1693 give us some insight into the intense details of the psychological turmoil that the brandy trade brought to native communities. Observers claimed that alcohol contributed to family violence, sexual license, theft, and murder. Pregnant women killed their babies or aborted them. And there were significant economic consequences as well; natives involved in the brandy trade became poor and lethargic, reducing the amount of furs that could be sent back to France. Furthermore, the liquor trade made colonization efforts more difficult due to the fact that intoxicated natives attacked colonists and made life unbearable for those around them.

=== Ramifications ===
No matter the specific details, native populations in the New World paid dearly for their thirst for alcoholic beverages. Alcohol undermined native villages by eroding the civility necessary to maintain a community. It contributed to the demographic catastrophe that reduced native populations. The pursuit of brandy led natives into poverty and debt. And drinking produced a culture of violence and fear. As well, though there is no evidence of widespread afflictions commonly associated with alcoholism, there were a significant number of recorded accidents due to intoxication, often ending in serious injury or death, which would affect the individual's family and community after the tragedy.
