= Sovereign Council of New France =

Governing body in New France

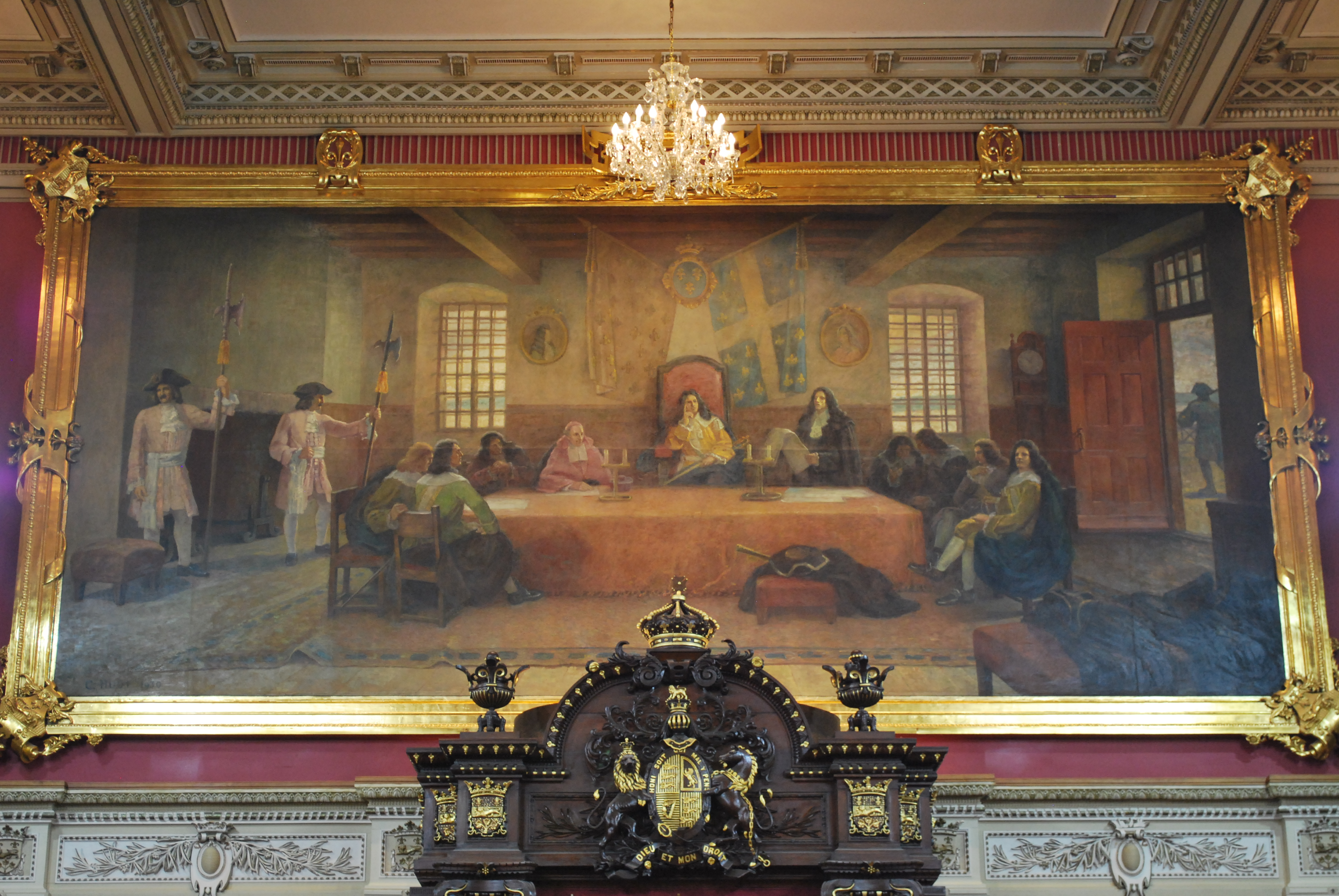

Type
- Type: Unicameral
- Houses: houses

History
- Founded: 1663
- Disbanded: 1760
- Preceded by: Council of Quebec (from 1647 onwards)
- Succeeded by: Council for the Affairs of the Province of Quebec (from 1764 onwards)

The Sovereign Council of New France (French: Conseil souverain de la Nouvelle-France, pronounced [kɔ̃sɛj suvʁɛ̃ də la nuvɛl fʁɑ̃s]), or simply Sovereign Council (French: Conseil souverain), was a governing body in New France. It served as both Supreme Court for the colony of New France, as well as a policy-making body, though this latter role diminished over time. The council, though officially established in 1663 by King Louis XIV of France, was not created from whole cloth, but rather evolved from earlier governing bodies. As early as 1647, a council of three was created by the King. In 1648, this council was enlarged to include five members. The Sovereign Council came to be known as the Superior Council (Conseil Supérieur) as early as June 16, 1703, when Louis XIV issued a royal edict referring to it as the Superior Council instead of its former name, and increasing the number of sitting Councilors from seven to twelve.

The institution lasted from its introduction in 1663 to the fall of New France in 1760. Its last meeting occurred on April 28, 1760, the day of the Battle of Sainte-Foy.

== Creation of the Council ==
In April 1662, Louis XIV issued an edict creating a new governing council named the "Sovereign Council." The new Sovereign Council had a broad policy mandate. The edict creating the Council authorized it to spend public funds, regulate the fur trade, regulate trade between colonists and French merchants, and issue police measures. The council was also to create a system of lower courts in Québec, Montréal, and Trois-Rivières, and was to appoint judges, bailiffs and other court officials. The Sovereign Council possessed a larger membership than previous colonial councils, having nine members in 1663. These nine members were the governor general, the bishop (or, in his absence, the senior ecclesiastic), five councilors, an attorney general, and a clerk.

The creation of the Sovereign Council was part of a broader effort to reform the administration of New France by Louis XIV and his finance minister, Jean-Baptiste Colbert. The King and Colbert felt that New France's administration had been badly mismanaged by charter companies and that the colony should be brought under tighter monarchal control. There was also a concern in the colony over the growing power of the Governor, especially in regard to the Church. In 1663, the colony was made an official province of the Kingdom of France. The crown's contract with the Company of One Hundred Associates, the main charter company in New France, was cancelled, and a new Charter company called the French West India Company was created.

== The Council and the Intendant ==
Around this time, the office of Intendant of New France was also established. The intendant was to be in charge of police, justice, and finance in the colony. Shortly after the post's creation in 1665, the intendant began to sit on the Sovereign Council, though its place on the council was not made official until 1675. Over time, the intendant became more powerful, and some of the former responsibilities of the council were shifted to the intendant, with the power to appoint lower court officials being granted to the position in 1680.

== Functions and achievements ==
One of the Sovereign Council's greatest achievements was its efficacy in processing civil suits. Contemporary evidence suggests that from the day defendants were summoned to court, they had one or two weeks to appear with their summons, at which time a verdict was definitively reached. More than just a judicial body, however, the Sovereign Council made lasting achievements in agriculture, commerce, the maintenance of public order, and sanitation. Many of these achievements were in the first century of the Sovereign Council's existence, prior to the dissolution of some of its responsibilities to the increasingly centralized intendant and other offices.

The Sovereign Council exercised considerable authority over New France's economic affairs. It dictated when certain types of commercial interactions could occur, and public markets in Québec City, Montréal and Trois Rivières were only established under the Sovereign Council's auspices. It was also the primary regulatory body for coinage, regulating colonial weights, measures and scales until paper currency surpassed metal currency in 1685. The Sovereign Council was very involved in early attempts to stimulate economic activity and maximize agricultural productivity. Ordinances mandated that seigneurs clear their seigneurs within an allotted time, and exempted small crops from yearly tithes for the first five years of cultivation. The Council sometimes directly intervened on behalf of the peasantry, the foundation of the colony. In 1680, it decreed that one-twentieth of uncleared land be made available to peasants. In an effort to protect the peasant's most valuable commodity, the cow, a 1686 ordinance enforced Louis XIV's edict that creditors could not seize cattle for debts until the year 1692. Similarly, after complaints were made that merchant monopolies were storing surpluses of wheat and preventing its circulation on the market in 1701, the Sovereign Council ordered a committee to inspect Quebec's granaries. The committee found that merchant monopolies were unfairly keeping surpluses, and the Sovereign Council consequently ordered that the surplus be seized and sold to the poor at a subsidized rate.

While the Council had to execute the King's administrative policies, it was often able to act independently given the geographic expanse of New France and its distance from metropolitan France. For example, the Sovereign Council allowed seigneurs to extract undue feudal tithes from peasants, which ran contrary to the Coutume de Paris until Louis XIV intervened and abolished the practice in 1717. The Sovereign Council undertook other policies aimed at the maintenance of public order with mixed success. A 1663 ordinance mandated the collection of extra food and clothing to distribute amongst the poor as part of an effort to mitigate social unrest. A 1668 edict established commissions distinguishing between the deserving poor and the undeserving poor. This notion that the deserving poor were worthy of local, parish-administered aid while the undeserving poor were destitute law-breakers was common in metropolitan France and Western Europe at the time. Reflecting colonial society's emphasis on righteousness and morality, the Sovereign Council mandated that every tavern-keeper provide sufficient proof of his virtuous character in order to obtain a business licence.

Attempts to improve public infrastructure were met with limited success. Early ventures in constructing roads proved especially futile given the necessity and the prevalence of rivers as a means of transportation. A 1664 ordinance that mandated inhabitants in the Grande Allée leave part of their land along the riverbed unsown was largely ignored for example. Peasants needed river access for their personal drinking water, crops, animals, and transportation. The Sovereign Council ordered the creation of the first highway linking Quebec to the countryside in 1667. In 1696, it delegated these responsibilities to the senior road surveyor, le grand voyer, with local captains of the militia in charge of overseeing the quality of the roads in each seigneurie. The Council exhibited some degree of commitment to sanitation and waste management, paving central town streets to minimize weather damage and accumulation of waste. One of its greater successes was actually enforcing an ordinance mandating that inhabitants in Quebec's Lower Town clear the area in front of their homes, until a seasonal worker with a horse and cart was eventually introduced. The Sovereign Council's only ordinance mandating wells be drilled in Upper and Lower Canada in 1687 was never realized. Cahall notes that drilling wells was likely not a priority because no epidemics arose as a result of inhabitants drinking contaminated water under the entirety of the Sovereign Council's administration from 1663 to 1760. Moreover, townspeople drank river water for the entirety of French colonial rule without much concern.

== The Sovereign Council as a Superior Court ==
The Sovereign Council acted as the court of appeal for decisions made in the lower courts in New France. Any criminal conviction could be appealed to the Council. There was some hope in a more favourable outcome, as the attorney general who sat on the Council was the only official in New France required having formal university legal training.

The Sovereign Council could also amend verdicts without overturning convictions. In 1734, an African slave burned her owner's home in protest. The local magistrate ordered the accused to be burned alive, but the Council intervened and commuted the punishment to death by hanging.

The crimes prosecuted by the colonial judicial system, the bishop, and, by extension, the Sovereign Council, were diverse, although extra weight was given to crimes that undermined France's colonial interests. An increasing problem was acts against the crown including forgery, where subjects created counterfeit money by modifying their playing cards (also a source of money at the time), and this comprised approximately 17% of all cases in the 18th century. Also rising as a proportion of all crimes over the 18th century were violent crimes like assault, which constituted approximately 1/3rd of all cases.

Concentration of prosecuted crimes was mainly around urban settings, notwithstanding the fact that towns represented only an average of 20% of New France's population. A large majority of the trials were held in Montreal, indicating a higher rate of crime further away from the seat of government and closer to the frontier. Approximately a third of the punishments mandated for the various crimes were fines, and a fifth executions.

== Conflict and the regulation of alcohol ==
A challenge that influenced the development of the Sovereign Council was the regulation of alcohol traded with Natives. Bishop François de Laval had called for an outright prohibition on the sale of alcohol to Indigenous Peoples in the early 1660s, and conflict between the Church and Jesuits on one hand and the Governor on the other is argued to have contributed to the establishment of the Council. The Council eventually agreed to the Bishop's demands, but with a fine, as opposed to a harsher punishment for conviction initially, but the issue would remain open. Prohibition of alcohol transactions with Aboriginals was an important cause to the Church, which was fearful of Native drunkenness. However, the majority of the Council was not willing to prosecute violators to the full extent of the legislation. Led by intendant Jean Talon, the Council then legalized the trade – not for moral reasons, but to increase profits of colonial subjects. An interim period followed where the Sovereign Council refused to mete out any sentences for the crimes, but the Church would excommunicate suspected traders. The activity did regain its illicit status, but the number of cases of the activity that made prosecution was trending downwards significantly throughout the later 18th century. Traffic of alcohol to Natives was only a minor crime by the mid-18th century.

== Composition ==
The Sovereign Council included nine officials who were fully responsible for all legislative, executive, and judicial matters. It made rules and enacted laws concerning the day-to-day affairs of the colony

- The Governor General of New France was the direct representative of the king of France and was responsible for defense and diplomatic relations.
- The Apostolic Vicar for New France (after 1674, Bishop of New France) was in control of religious affairs, which included charity, education, hospitals and the Christianization of Amerindians.
- The Intendant of New France was responsible for economic affairs and trade, the administration of justice, finance, settlement and seigneurialism. He traveled from house to house asking what should be improved.
- The Captain of the Militia informed the inhabitants of the Intendant's plans for the development for the colony, reported on the concerns of the people, and tallied the census. As New France became better organized, further captains were added in each province to fulfill the duties of the Council.
- Five councillors served as a Court of Appeal and as a governing body, and they formed the colony's senior court of law. In 1703, the number of councillors was increased to twelve. Prior to 1675, the councillors were appointed by the Governor General and thereafter by the King alone. Amongst these councillors were included the offices of Procurator General and Registrar of New France.

== Members of the Council ==
=== Governor General of New France ===
| Name | Term | Sovereign |
|---|---|---|
| Augustin de Mésy | 1663–1665 | Louis XIV |
| Daniel de Courcelle | 1665–1672 | Louis XIV |
| Le comte de Frontenac | 1672–1682 | Louis XIV |
| Antoine Lefèbvre de La Barre | 1682–1685 | Louis XIV |
| Le marquis de Denonville | 1685–1689 | Louis XIV |
| Le comte de Frontenac | 1689–1698 | Louis XIV |
| Guillaume Couture | 1690–1698 | Louis XIV |
| Hector de Callière | 1698–1703 | Louis XIV |
| Philippe de Rigaud de Vaudreuil | 1703–1725 | Louis XV |
| Le marquis de Beauharnois | 1726–1747 | Louis XV |
| Le comte de La Galissonnière | 1747–1749 | Louis XV |
| Le Marquis de la Jonquière | 1749–1752 | Louis XV |
| Le Marquis Duquesne | 1752–1755 | Louis XV |
| Pierre François de Rigaud, Marquis de Vaudreuil-Cavagnal | 1755–1760 | Louis XV |

=== Intendant of New France ===
The Indendant was President of the Council.

| Name | Term | Sovereign |
|---|---|---|
| Jean Talon | 1665–1668 | Louis XIV |
| Claude de Boutroue d'Aubigny | 1668–1670 | Louis XIV |
| Jean Talon | 1669–1672 | Louis XIV |
| Jacques Duchesneau de la Doussinière et d'Ambault | 1675–1682 | Louis XIV |
| Jacques de Meulles | 1682–1686 | Louis XIV |
| Jean Bochart de Champigny, sieur de Noroy de Verneuil | 1686–1702 | Louis XIV |
| François de Beauharnois de la Chaussaye, Baron de Beauville | 1702–1705 | Louis XIV |
| Jacques Raudot co-intendant | 1705–1711 | Louis XIV |
| Antoine-Denis Raudot co-intendant | 1705–1710 | Louis XIV |
| Michel Bégon de la Picardière | 1712–1726 | Louis XV |
| Claude-Thomas Dupuy | 1726–1728 | Louis XV |
| Gilles Hocquart | 1729–1748 | Louis XV |
| François Bigot | 1748–1760 | Louis XV |

=== Bishop of Quebec ===
| Name | Term | Sovereign |
|---|---|---|
| Bishop François de Montmorency-Laval | 1658–1688 | Louis XIV |
| Bishop Jean-Baptiste de la Croix de Chevrières de Saint-Vallier | 1688–1727 | Louis XIV (until September 1715) and Louis XV |
| Bishop Louis-François Duplessis de Mornay | 1727–1733 | Louis XV |
| Bishop Pierre-Herman Dosquet | 1733–1739 | Louis XV |
| Bishop François-Louis de Pourroy de Lauberivière | 1739–1740 | Louis XV |
| Bishop Henri-Marie Dubreil de Pontbriand | 1741–1760 | Louis XV |

== See also ==
- New France
- Timeline of Quebec history
- List of governors general of Canada
- List of French possessions and colonies

== Sources ==
- Raymond Du Bois Cahall, The Sovereign Council of New France: A Study in Canadian Constitutional History, New York: Columbia University
- John A. Dickinson (1995), "New France: Law, Courts, and the Coutume de Paris, 1608–1760", Manitoba Law Journal, 23
- Eric Wenzel (2012), La justice criminelle en Nouvelle-France (1670–1760) : Le Grand Arrangement, Dijon: Éditions universitaires de Dijon
