= Bouteroue =

Bouteroue may refer to:

== Persons ==
- Claude de Boutroue d'Aubigny (1620–1680), a knight and an Intendant of Nouvelle-France from 1668 to 1670

== Places ==
- Bouteroue Lake, Quebec, Canada
- Bouteroue Creek, Quebec, Canada
