= Seignory of Rimouski =

Coordinates: 48.4167°N 68.5333°W

Rimouski Seignory (Quebec)

The Rimouski Seignory (French: seigneurie de Rimouski) was a seignory during the French colonisation of New France. It was located in the present-day Rimouski-Neigette Regional County Municipality in Bas-Saint-Laurent, Quebec.

== History ==
Coat of arms of René Lepage de Sainte-Claire

The Rimouski Seignory was first granted to Augustin Rouer de la Cardonnière by the Marquis de Denonville, governor of New France, on April 24, 1688. Augustin did not work on developing the seignory, and only used the territory for fishing. Jean Bochart de Champigny, Intendant of New France, was unhappy with seignors in Bas-Saint-Laurent who did not work towards the development of their seignories. He looked for new seignors who would develop the seignories by using them for farming. Thus René Lepage de Sainte-Claire became the owner of the seignory of Rimouski by exchanging it for his land on the Island of Orleans with Augustin Rouer on July 10, 1694.

== Territory ==
At the time of its granting in 1688 the Rimouski Seignory measured two leagues along the Saint Lawrence River and extended two leagues away from the river. Its territory included both sides of the Rimouski River and the Saint-Barnabé Island.
