= Seignory of Bic =

Coordinates: 48.3500°N 68.7000°W

Seignory of Bic (Quebec)

The seignory of Bic was a seignory during the French colonisation of New France. It was located in present Rimouski-Neigette Regional County Municipality in Bas-Saint-Laurent.

== History ==
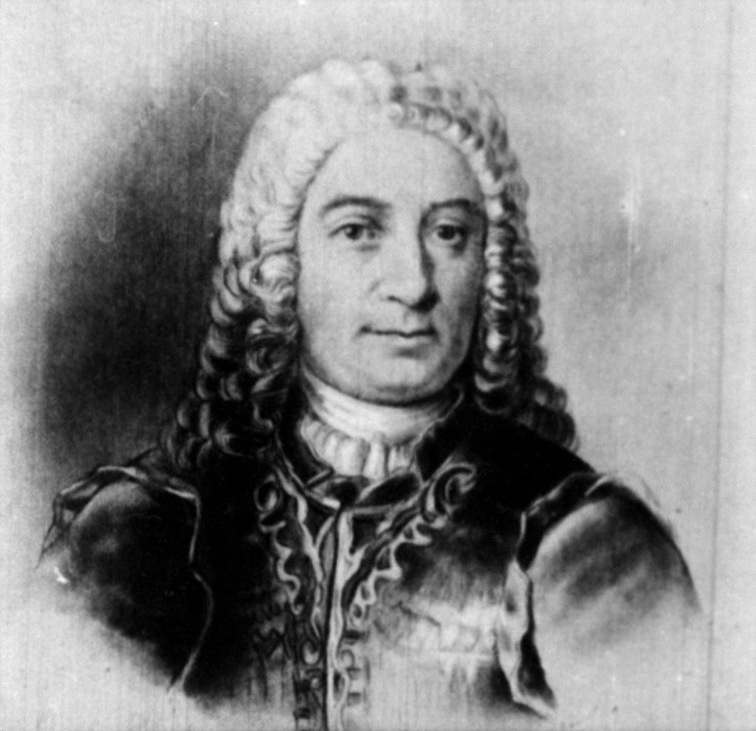
Charles Aubert de La Chesnaye, second seignor of Bic

The maritime site of Bic became a ships mooring location as soon as first French explorers came to North America.

The seignory was granted on May 6, 1675, to Charles Denys de Vitré who belonged to an important French family and who was a member of the Sovereign Council of New France since 1673. According to the historian Jos D. Michaud, Jean Gaignon was the first inhabitant of European descent to establish himself in the territory of the seignory around 1680 as a fisherman. A census conducted in 1688 reported one family of 12 members living in Bic.

In 1688 Charles Denys de Vitré sold the seignory to Charles Aubert de La Chesnaye, reimbursing a debt of 2050 livres. Gaignon died in 1699 and his family left the seignory. After that the seignory remained uninhabited until 1750.

== Territory ==
At the time of its first granting in 1675 the seignory covered two by two leagues along the Saint Lawrence River. Its territory also included the Bic Island.
