= Jean Bochart de Champigny =

Administrative official of New France

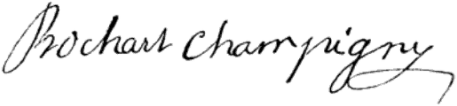
Signature of Jean Bochart de Champigny

Jean Bochart de Champigny, Sieur de Noroy et de Verneuil (French pronunciation: [ʒɑ̃ bɔʃaʁ də ʃɑ̃piɲi]; 1643–September 27, 1720), was Intendant of New France from 1686 to 1702. His mandate was one of the longest, rivalling those of Hocquart and Bégon. He served as intendant during the terms of Governors Denonville, Frontenac, and Callière, and was in office at the time of King William's War, the Lachine Massacre, the Battle of Quebec, and the Great Peace of Montreal.

== Early life ==
Jean Bochart de Champigny was born in 1643 in France, the son of Jean Bochart de Champigny (Intendant of Rouen) and Marie Boivin. Little is known about his life before his appointment as intendant, however, it is likely that he was educated at a Jesuit college, studied law, and had held a number of minor administrative posts in France. He married Marie-Madeleine de Chaspoux, Dame de Verneuil et Du Plessis-Savari.

== Intendant of New France ==
Champigny was appointed as Intendant of New France by Louis XIV on April 24, 1686. He embarked from La Rochelle with his pregnant wife and two of his sons on July 22. He took with him a bronze copy of the Bust of Louis XIV by Gian Lorenzo Bernini which he installed in the market square of the lower town of Quebec, site of present-day Place Royale, so that the inhabitants of New France would know what their sovereign looked like.

Jacques-René de Brisay, Marquis de Denonville, Governor General of New France, was pleased that Champigny had been chosen for the position. Champigny's predecessor, Jacques de Meulles, had frequently quarrelled with Denonville as well as with the previous governor Antoine Lefèbvre de La Barre.

Champigny helped Devonville organize the 1687 military campaign against the Seneca. The Seneca threatened the French hold on the Pays d'en Haut and in recent years had become extremely aggressive. In preparation for Denonville's expedition, Champigny led an advance party to Fort Frontenac at the eastern end of Lake Ontario in June 1687. To ensure surprise, and also to have hostages available for exchange should any of the French be captured, Campigny had two groups of Oneida who were encamped near the fort taken captive. One group was taken by force, but the second was lured into the fort by the promised of a feast. Following the orders of Louis XIV, Denonville reluctantly sent 36 of the male prisoners to France to serve as galley slaves.

As intendant, Champigny was responsible for justice, civil administration, economic development, and finance in the colony, as well as the social welfare of the inhabitants. In 1688, he asked the Sovereign Council of New France to establish a Bureau for the Poor in Quebec, Montreal and Trois-Rivières so as to support the indigent by giving them work. Begging, except for the most needy, was prohibited. He sought to limit the negative impact of the fur trade on agriculture by restricting the number of people who could trade for furs in the Pays d'en Haut. Champigny hoped that the young men of the colony would turn their focus from the fur trade to farming, fishing, and lumbering. He encouraged the growing of hemp and flax, and the raising of sheep, in order to facilitate the production of rope and clothing.

Champigny ensured that the Troupes de la Marine were always well supplied even if it meant risking the wrath of the Ministère de la Marine. After several reprimands for excessive spending, Champigny reminded the minister that soldiers in France didn't need snowshoes or canoes, and that expenditures could not be reduced "unless it was decided to abandon the colony completely and leave it a prey to its enemies."

The relationship between intendant and governor became strained after the arrival of Louis de Buade, Comte de Frontenac in October 1689. On a number of occasions Frontenac abused his authority and interfered in the administration of justice. He undermined Champigny's efforts to limit the number of independent fur-traders by granting twice as many licences as permitted, and ignored the king's order strictly forbidding officers and soldiers to engage in trade. Similarly, when Champigny implemented the king's policy of not trading brandy for furs, Frontenac countermanded his ordinances.

During King William's War, Champigny was critical of Frontenac's leadership. He strongly disagreed with Frontenac's decision to rebuild Fort Frontenac which Denonville had ordered destroyed in 1689. Champigny considered the fort "useless" and believed that maintaining a garrison there was a waste of resources. Frontenac was reluctant to invade Iroquois territory, but under pressure from Champigny and the minister he launched an invasion of Onondaga and Oneida territory in the summer of 1696.

At times, Champigny also found himself in conflict with the Bishop of Quebec. He refused to give control of royal subsidies to the bishop, and contested the distribution of priests in the colony.

When Frontenac died in November 1698, Champigny wrote to the minister: "The foremost favour that I could ask of you, my lord, is that you send us a governor who has no other aim but to carry out the king's orders." Louis XIV appointed the governor of Montreal, Louis-Hector de Callière as the new Governor General.

Champigny's relationship with Frontenac's successor was far less acrimonious. Champigny and Callière agreed on most questions of policy and together negotiated the Great Peace of Montreal with the Iroquois. 39 Indigenous nations signed the treaty which ended two-thirds of a century of what historians have called the “Beaver Wars."

== Return to France and Death ==
In May 1701, Champigny was appointed by the king to the post of intendant at Le Havre. He returned to France with his wife the following year. While at Le Havre he served for several years as an adviser on colonial affairs to the minister.

Jean Bochart de Champigny died on September 27, 1720, aged 77, and was buried the next day at Notre-Dame Cathedral in Le Havre.

Government offices
| Preceded by Jacques de Meulles | Intendant of New France; 1686 – 1702 | Succeeded by François_de_Beauharnois_de_la_Chaussaye |
