= Claude de Boutroue d'Aubigny =

Intendent of New France

Claude de Bouteroue d'Aubigny (1620–1680) was the intendant of New France from 1668 to 1670. His tenure was between two periods served by Jean Talon in that position.
