= Jacques de Meulles =

Jacques de Meulles, seigneur of La Source (died 1703), was intendant (1682–86) and interim governor general of New France. He was the son of Pierre de Meulles, king's councillor, treasurer-general of war supplies; d. 1703.

As chief administrator of the Colony, he issued playing cards as legal tender from 1684 onwards owing to a shortage of coins. The funds were used, in part, to pay soldiers who arrived in New France since 1665 to protect and built the colony.

He frequently came into conflict with Louis de Buade de Frontenac, the governor of New France, including a dispute over the siting of Quebec (Meulles wanted to rebuild it further into the lower-town). After his colonial career, he retired to Orléans.
