= Louis de Buade de Frontenac =

French soldier and governor (1622–1698)

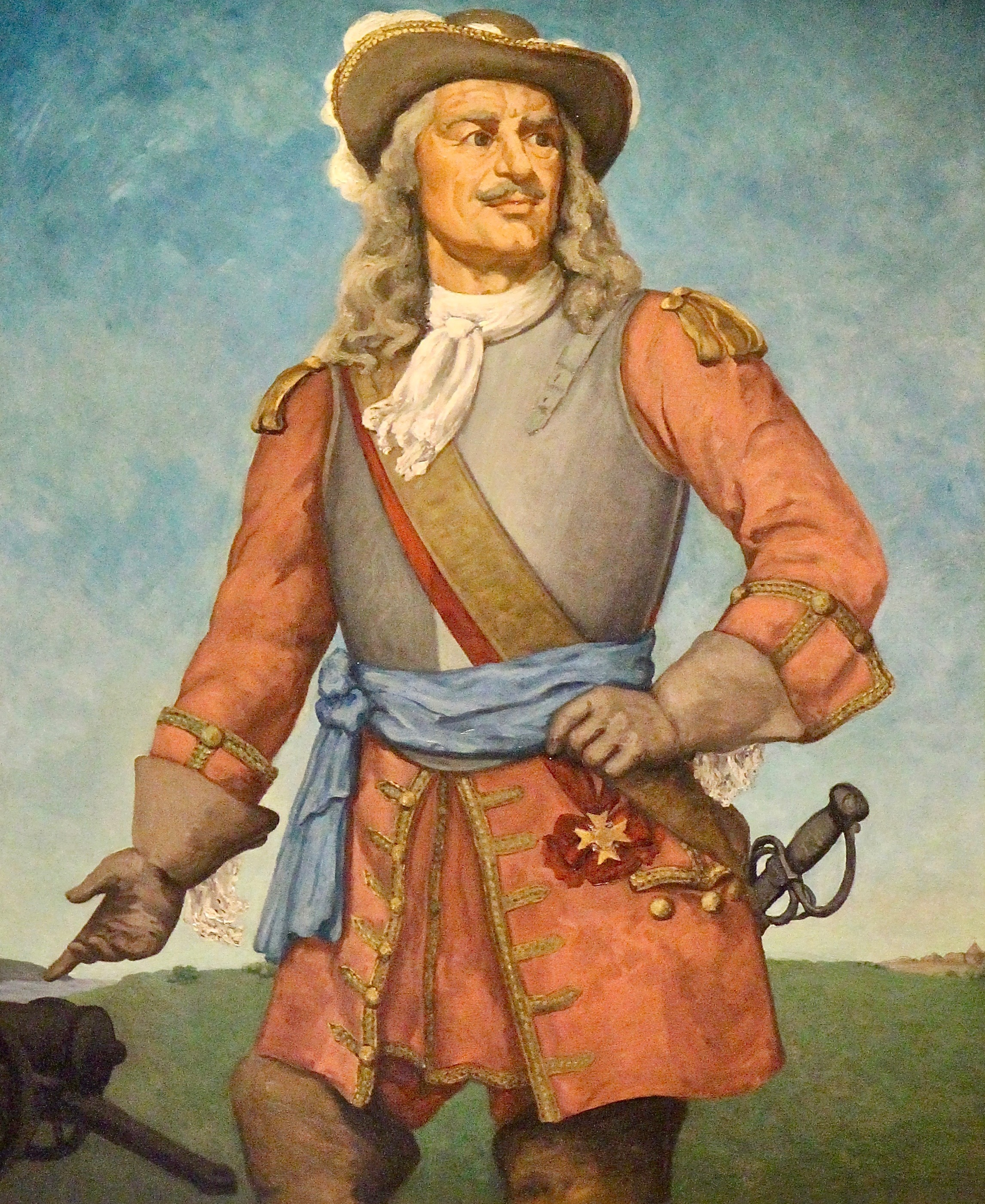

3rd and 6th Governor General of New France
- In office 1672–1682
- Monarch: Louis XIV
- Deputy: none (1672–1675); Jacques Duchesneau de la Doussinière et d'Ambault (1675–1682)
- Preceded by: Daniel de Rémy de Courcelle
- Succeeded by: Joseph-Antoine Le Febvre de La Barre
- In office 1689–1698
- Monarch: Louis XIV
- Deputy: Jean Bochart de Champigny
- Preceded by: Jacques-René de Brisay de Denonville, Marquis de Denonville
- Succeeded by: Louis-Hector de Callière

Personal details
- Born: 22 May 1622 Saint-Germain-en-Laye, France
- Died: 28 November 1698 (aged 76) Chateau St-Louis, Quebec City, New France

Louis de Buade, Comte de Frontenac et de Palluau (French pronunciation: [lwi də bɥad kɔ̃t də fʁɔ̃tənak e də palɥo]; 22 May 1622 – 28 November 1698) was a French soldier, courtier, and Governor General of New France in North America from 1672 to 1682, and again from 1689 to his death in 1698. He established a number of Forts on the Great Lakes and engaged in a series of battles against the English and the Haudenosaunee (Iroquois).

In his first term, he supported the expansion of the fur trade, establishing Fort Frontenac (in what is now Kingston, Ontario) and came into conflict with the other members of the Sovereign Council over its expansion and over the corvée that were required to build the new forts. In particular, despite the opposition of Bishop François de Laval, he supported selling brandy to the aboriginal tribes, which Laval considered a mortal sin. The conflict with the Sovereign Council led to his recall in 1682.

His second term was characterised by the defence of Quebec from an English invasion during King William's War, a successful campaign against Haudenosaunee and English settlements that resulted in the elimination of the Haudenosaunee threat against New France and a large expansion of the fur trade using Canadian coureurs des bois. He died before his second recall to France.

== Early life ==
Frontenac was born in Saint-Germain-en-Laye, France, the son of Henri de Buade, colonel in the regiment of Navarre, and Anne Phélypeaux, daughter of Raymond Phélypeaux. The details of his early life are meager, as no trace of the Frontenac papers has been discovered. The de Buades, however, were a family of distinction in the principality of Béarn. Antoine de Buade, seigneur de Frontenac, grandfather of the future governor of New France, attained eminence as a councilor of state under Henri IV; and his children were brought up with the dauphin, afterwards Louis XIII.

Frontenac entered the army at an early age. In 1635 he began his military career and he served under the prince of Orange in Holland, and fought with credit and received many injuries during engagements in the Low Countries and in Italy. He was promoted to the rank of colonel in the regiment of Normandy in 1643, and three years later, after distinguishing himself at the siege of Orbetello, where he had an arm broken, he was made maréchal de camp. In the 17th century, warfare ceased during the winter months, and Frontenac, being a soldier, needed to keep occupied. Like many military officers, Frontenac took residence at the King's court. Such a lavish lifestyle proved to be costly, and his time at the King's court only led him to amass more debt. His growing debt led him to seek an arrêt du Conseil d'état later in his life to protect his properties from his creditors, who otherwise would have been able to seize them.

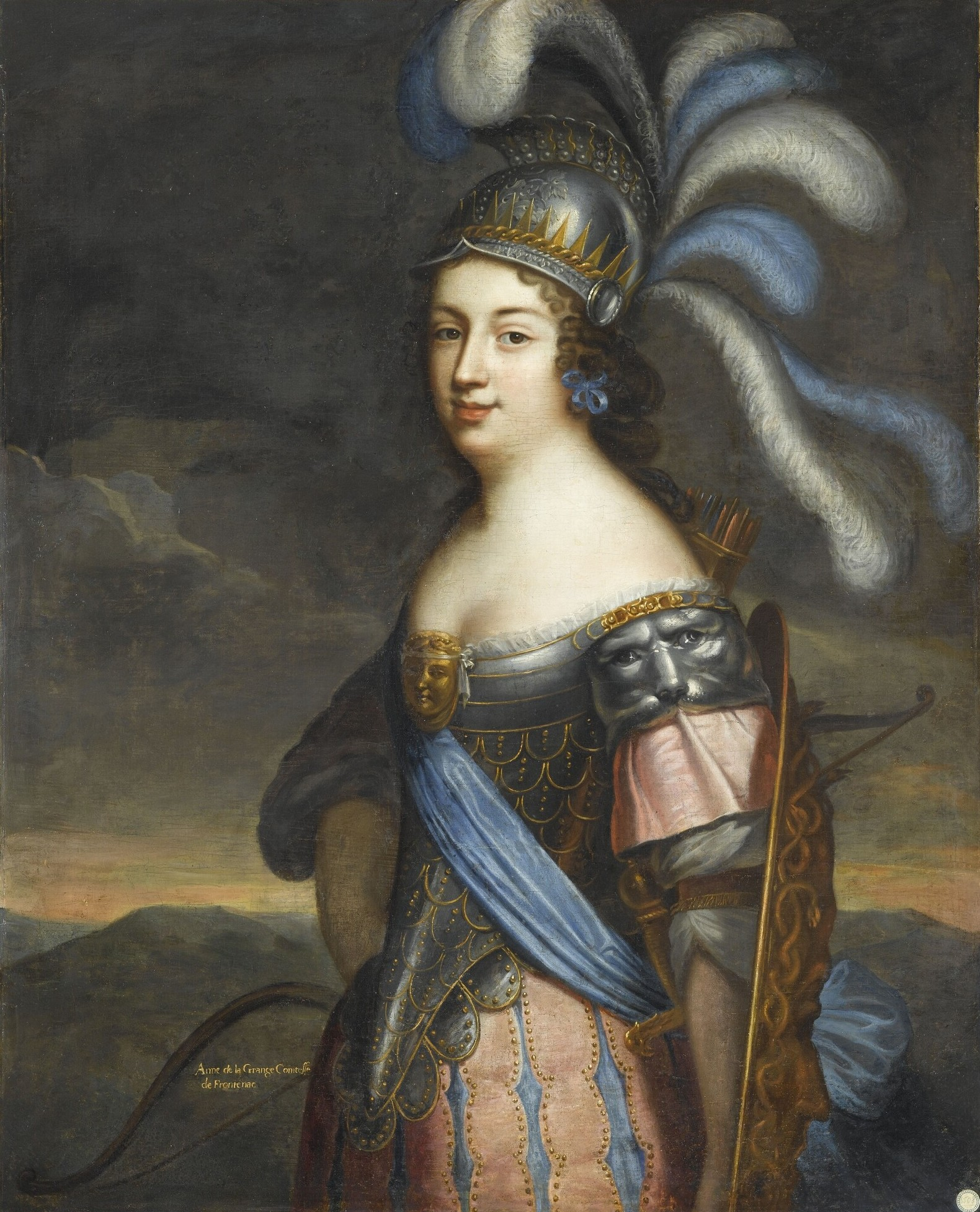
Frontenac married Anne de La Grange-Trianon in October 1648.

His service seems to have been continuous until the conclusion of the Peace of Westphalia in 1648, when he returned to his father's house in Paris and married, without the consent of her parents, Anne de la Grange-Trianon in October 1648. Frontenac courted her because she was set to inherit a large sum of money from her deceased mother and her father upon his death. Anne de la Grange-Trianon's father had remarried and had a second child to ensure that his fortune would not go to his daughter and the son-in-law that he disapproved of. Therefore, when Frontenac's father-in-law died, Frontenac did not receive the money he was hoping for as his wife's father left his fortune to his new wife. The marriage was not a happy one, and after the birth of a son incompatibility of temper led to a separation, the count retiring to his estate on the Indre, where by an extravagant course of living, he became hopelessly in debt. Little is known of his career for the next fifteen years beyond the fact that he held a high position at court, but in 1669, when France sent a contingent to assist the Venetians in the defense of Crete against the Ottomans, Frontenac was placed in command of the troops on the recommendation of Turenne. In that expedition he won military glory, but his fortune was not improved.

In 1664, Frontenac admitted to owing debt of 325,878 livres, plus 17,350 livres of interest to his creditors, which had not been repaid by 1672, when his property was seized by creditors. Frontenac, however, was offered the position of governor-general of New France which deferred his debts until the end of his governorship. Frontenac was appointed governor and lieutenant general of New France, Acadia, the island of Newfoundland on 6 April 1672 and arrived in Quebec on 7 September that same year.

A 17th-century painting of Anne de la Grange-Trianon can be seen at the Château de Versailles.

== First term in New France ==
At this period the affairs of New France claimed the unexpected attention of the French court. From the year 1665 the colony had been successfully administered by three men: Daniel de Rémy de Courcelle, the governor, Jean Talon, the intendant, and the Marquis de Tracy, who had been appointed lieutenant general for the French king in America; but a difference of opinion had arisen between the governor and the intendant, and each had demanded the other's recall in the public interest. At this crisis in the administration of New France, Frontenac was appointed to succeed Rémy de Courcelle.

From the beginning of Frontenac's term, it was evident that he was prepared to effect a policy of colonial expansion. He was also eager to inaugurate an era of prosperity for Canada. He exercised an independence of action that did not coincide with the views of his minister Colbert. As governor, Frontenac was the most powerful figure within the colony and among his duties as governor, Frontenac maintained control over military matters as well as foreign affairs. In the context of being a French colony, foreign affairs largely encompassed maintaining amicable relations between French settlers and indigenous peoples. Although the governor was not allowed to intervene in matters handled by the Sovereign Council and the intendant, persons in these formal posts had to respect the governor as the ultimate voice of authority. Such compliance was based on the notion that the governor was the king's representative. The governor was not merely an intermediary or a stand-in but extended the king's authority from France to the North American colony. As one of his first acts as governor, he established the three estates in Canada – nobles, clergy and people – and convened a colonial Estates General to have the estates pledge fealty to him. Pledging fealty to the governor implied that all of the colony's settlers also pledged allegiance to the king and Frontenac did not take this lightly. The royal policy, however, was averse to the granting of extensive political rights to the Canadian settlers, and Frontenac's reforms in this direction were disapproved of. In relation to the hierarchy of authority within the colonial setting, any check on the governor's power was absent. In Frontenac's case, France's finance minister Jean-Baptiste Colbert, who resided in France, was the only person who could impose any restraints upon the governor's powers. Thus, measures were adopted to curb his ambition by increasing the power of the Sovereign Council and by once again reviving the office of intendant. Responding to this reduction in the Sovereign Council to nothing more than a figurehead, he expressed his frustration by challenging the authority of the intendant, Jacques Duchesnau and demanding that the council refer to him as the "chief and president".

Frontenac was a dominant man, jealous of authority, and prepared to exact obedience from all and yield to none. In the course of events he soon became involved in quarrels with the intendant regarding questions of precedence and with the ecclesiastics, one or two of whom ventured to criticize his proceedings. The church in New France had been administered for many years by the religious orders; for the see of Quebec, so long contemplated, had not yet been erected. But three years after the arrival of Frontenac, a former vicar apostolic, François-Xavier de Montmorency-Laval, returned to Quebec as bishop, with a jurisdiction over the whole of New France. The governor found a vigorous opponent in Laval, who was determined to render the state subordinate to the church. Frontenac, following in this respect in the footsteps of his predecessors, had issued trading licenses which permitted the sale of intoxicants. The bishop, supported by the intendant, tried to suppress this trade and sent an ambassador to France to obtain remedial action. The views of the bishop were upheld and authority was divided. Troubles ensued between the governor and the Sovereign Council, over its expansion and over the corvées required to build the new forts. In particular, despite the opposition of the bishop, he supported selling brandy to the First Nations, which Laval considered a mortal sin. The king and his minister had to listen to and adjudicate upon the appeals from the contending parties until one incident tried their patience. After the adolescent son of Duchesneau was verbally abused on the street by a follower of Frontenac, he physically assaulted him with his cane when Frontenac deemed his explanation unacceptable and, after negotiation between himself, the intendant and the bishop, an officer of Frontenac detained and imprisoned Duchesneau's son. Under the king's edict of 1679, it was forbidden for a governor to arbitrarily imprison any subjects. After a deliberation in Versailles, both governor and intendant were recalled to France in the year 1682.

During Frontenac's first administration many improvements had been made in the country. The defenses had been strengthened, a fort was built at Cataraqui (now Kingston, Ontario), bearing the governor's name, and conditions of peace had been fairly maintained between the Haudenosaunee on the one hand and the French and their allies, the Ottawas and the Hurons, on the other. Frontenac made his way to Cataraqui to build his post that would facilitate trading with the Haudenosaunee Confederacy. Even though Frontenac was disobeying Colbert's policies, he was able to continuously act in such a way because he represented the king. Throughout his first term, Frontenac was engaging in the fur trade to increase his own fortune and those of his associates. According to La Salle's personal memoir, Frontenac was also trying to secure a monopoly over a large part of the fur trade. The progress of events during the next few years proved that the recall of the governor had been ill-timed. The Haudenosaunee were assuming a threatening attitude towards the inhabitants, and Frontenac's successor, La Barre, was quite incapable of leading an army against such foes. At the end of a year, La Barre was replaced by the Marquis de Denonville, a man of ability and courage, who, though he showed some vigour in marching against the western Haudenosaunee nations, angered rather than intimidated them, and the massacre of Lachine on 5 August 1689 must be regarded as one of the unhappy results of his administration.

== Second term in New France ==
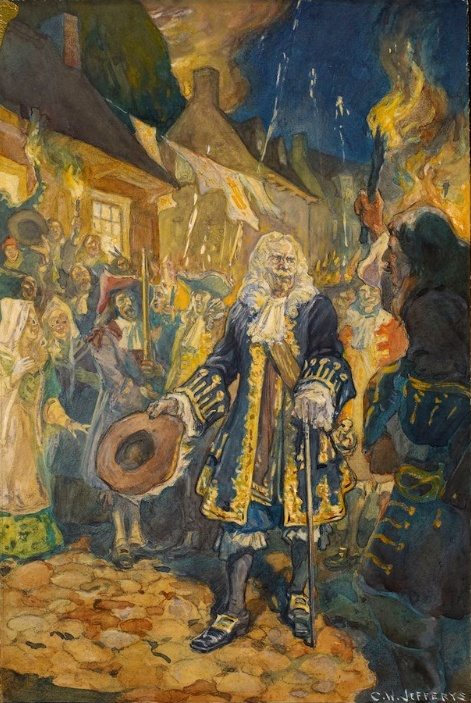
Reception for Frontenac's return to Quebec in October 1689

The affairs of the colony were now critical. A man of experience and decision was needed to cope with the difficulties, and Louis XIV, chose Frontenac to represent and uphold the power of France. When on 17 October 1689, Frontenac arrived in Quebec as governor for the second time, he received an enthusiastic welcome, and confidence was at once restored in the public mind. Quebec was not long to enjoy peace.

Frontenac's return to New France during the Nine Years' War offered him an opportunity to display his military capabilities against England in North America. Despite the tensions created during his first term as governor-general, Frontenac was still unwilling to share power with the Sovereign Council and continued to profit from the Canadian fur trade. In January 1690, Frontenac approved the use of raiding parties composed of French and Indigenous raiders to attack English border settlements. The parties raided the towns of Schenectady and Salmon Falls and killed English colonists, but spared the Haudenosaunee. The raids were intended to deter the English from forming an alliance with the Haudenosaunee, but instead united the English colonies against New France. On October 16, 1690, an invasion force from the New England Colonies under Sir William Phips, the governor of Massachusetts, appeared off l'Île d'Orléans, and an officer was sent ashore to demand the surrender of the fort. Frontenac responded by stating: "No, I have no reply to make to your general save from the mouths of my cannons and muskets." In the ensuing Battle of Quebec, Frontenac's forces completely repulsed Phip's invasion force, who in their hasty retreat left behind five pieces of artillery on the Beauport shore.

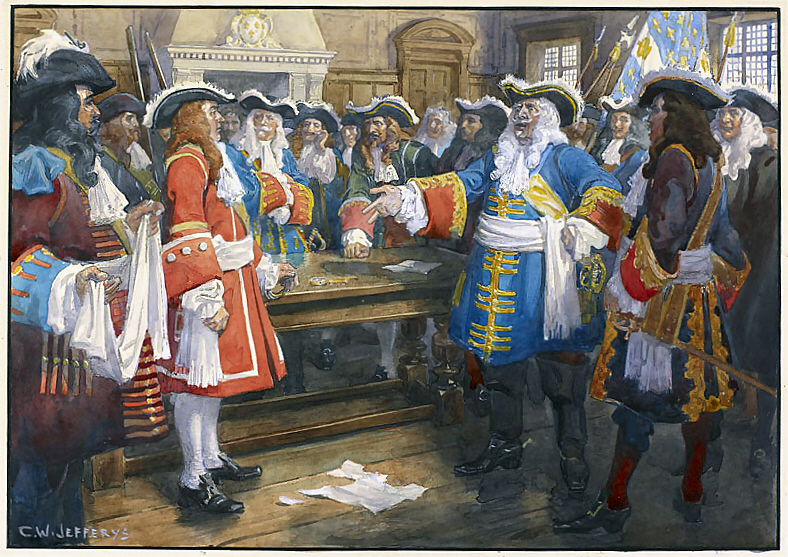
Frontenac receiving the envoy of William Phipps demanding the surrender of Quebec prior to the Battle of Quebec in 1690

The prestige of the governor was increased by this event, and he was prepared to follow up his advantage by an attack on Boston from the sea, but his resources were inadequate. New France now rejoiced in a brief respite from her enemies, and during the interval Frontenac paid some attention to the social life of the colony and encouraged the revival of drama at the Chateau St-Louis.

New France had been under intermittent attack throughout the 17th century. The people, however, were not subdued and for two years after the Phips attack, petty warfare was maintained. The sufferings of the colony, infested by war parties, were extreme. The fur trade, which formed its only resource for subsistence, was completely cut off, and a great accumulation of furs remained in the trading posts of the upper lakes, prevented from descending by the watchful enemy. To meet the threat, he dispatched Jean Baptiste Bissot, Sieur de Vincennes to establish a trading post and fort at Kekionga, present day Fort Wayne, Indiana. At a grand council of the friendly tribes, Frontenac took up a hatchet, brandished it in the air, and sang the war song, his officers following his example. The Christian Indians of the neighboring missions rose and joined them, and so did the Hurons and the Algonquins of Lake Nipissing, while Frontenac led the dance, whooping like the rest. His allies promised war to the death, and several years of conflict followed. After three years of destitution and misery, Frontenac broke the blockade of the Ottawa; the coveted treasure came safely to Montreal, and the colonists hailed him as their father and deliverer.

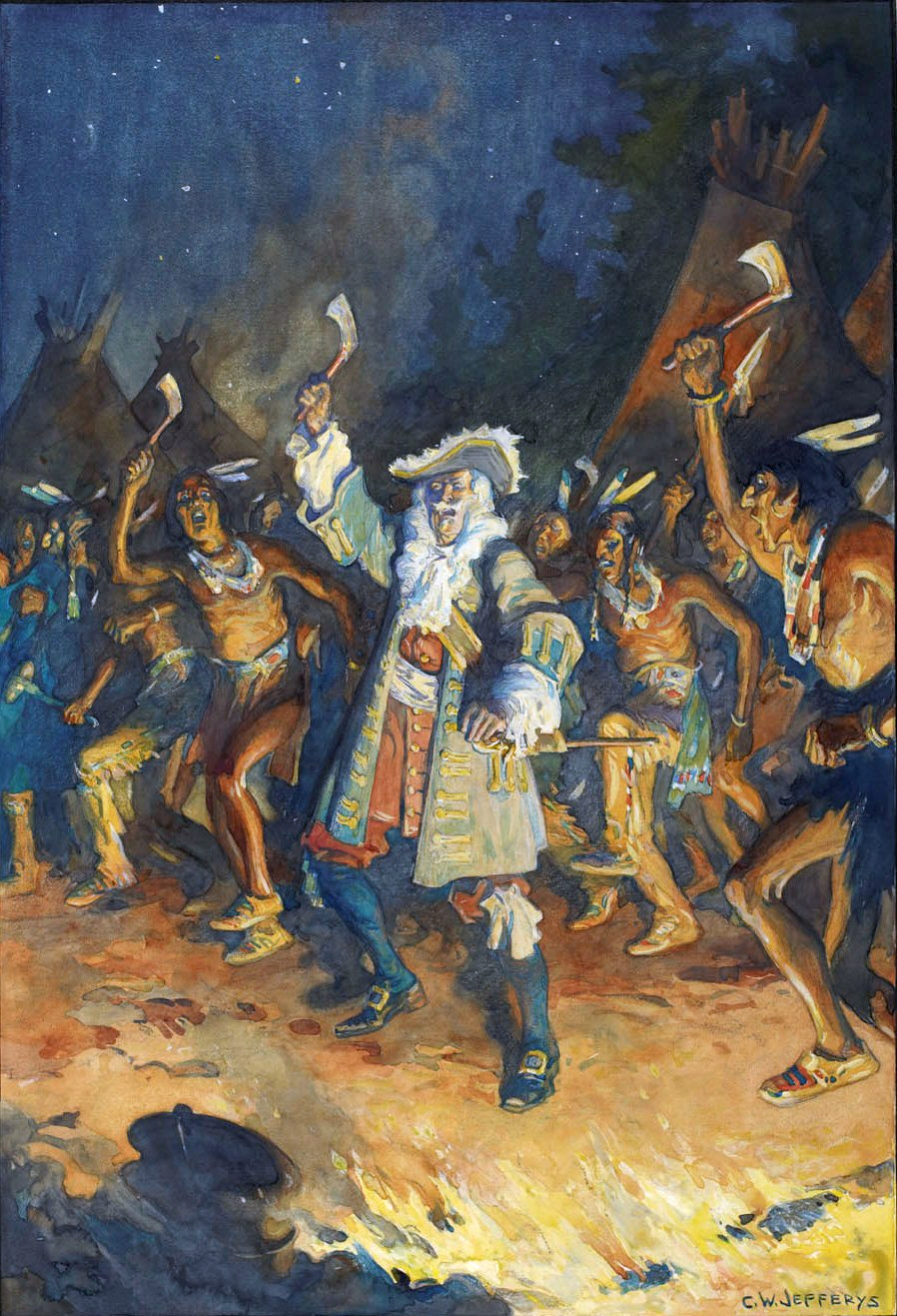
Frontenac with indigenous allies, c. 1690

In 1696 Frontenac decided to take the field against the Haudenosaunee, although at this time he was 74 years old. On July 6, he left Lachine as the head of a considerable force for the village of the Onondagas, where he arrived a month later. In the meantime, the Haudenosaunee had abandoned their villages, and as pursuit was impracticable, the army commenced its return march on August 10. Frontenac endured the march as well as the youngest soldier, and for his courage and prowess he received the cross of St. Louis. Under Frontenac's leadership, arranged to provide all militiamen with clothing and equipment. This consisted generally of a capote, a breechcloth, leggings, a blanket, moccasins, a knife and two shirts, The clothing did not constitute a military uniform but was simply Canadian-style civilian wear. Since these men were not paid, this was a relatively economical way of maintaining an effective militia, the Canadian militia became increasingly adept at guerrilla warfare and took the war into Haudenosaunee territory and attacked a number of English settlements. After waging a war of attrition between 1690 and 1698, the Haudenosaunee fled the raided territory and negotiated for peace with the French. The result was that the threat of the Haudenosaunee to New France was finally diffused.

At the time of his second appointment as governor in 1689, France authorized the importation of enslaved Africans to Quebec from French colonies in the West Indies.

Frontenac died on 28 November 1698 at the Chateau St-Louis after a brief illness and was deeply mourned by the Canadian people. The faults of the governor were those of temperament. His nature was turbulent, and from his youth he had been used to command, but underlying a rough exterior there was evidence of a kindly heart. He was fearless, resourceful and decisive, and triumphed as few men could have done over the difficulties and dangers of a most critical position.

== Honours ==
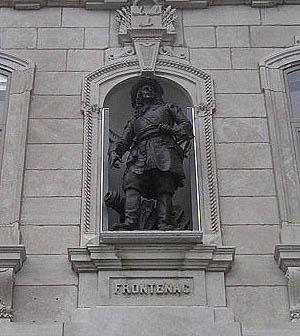
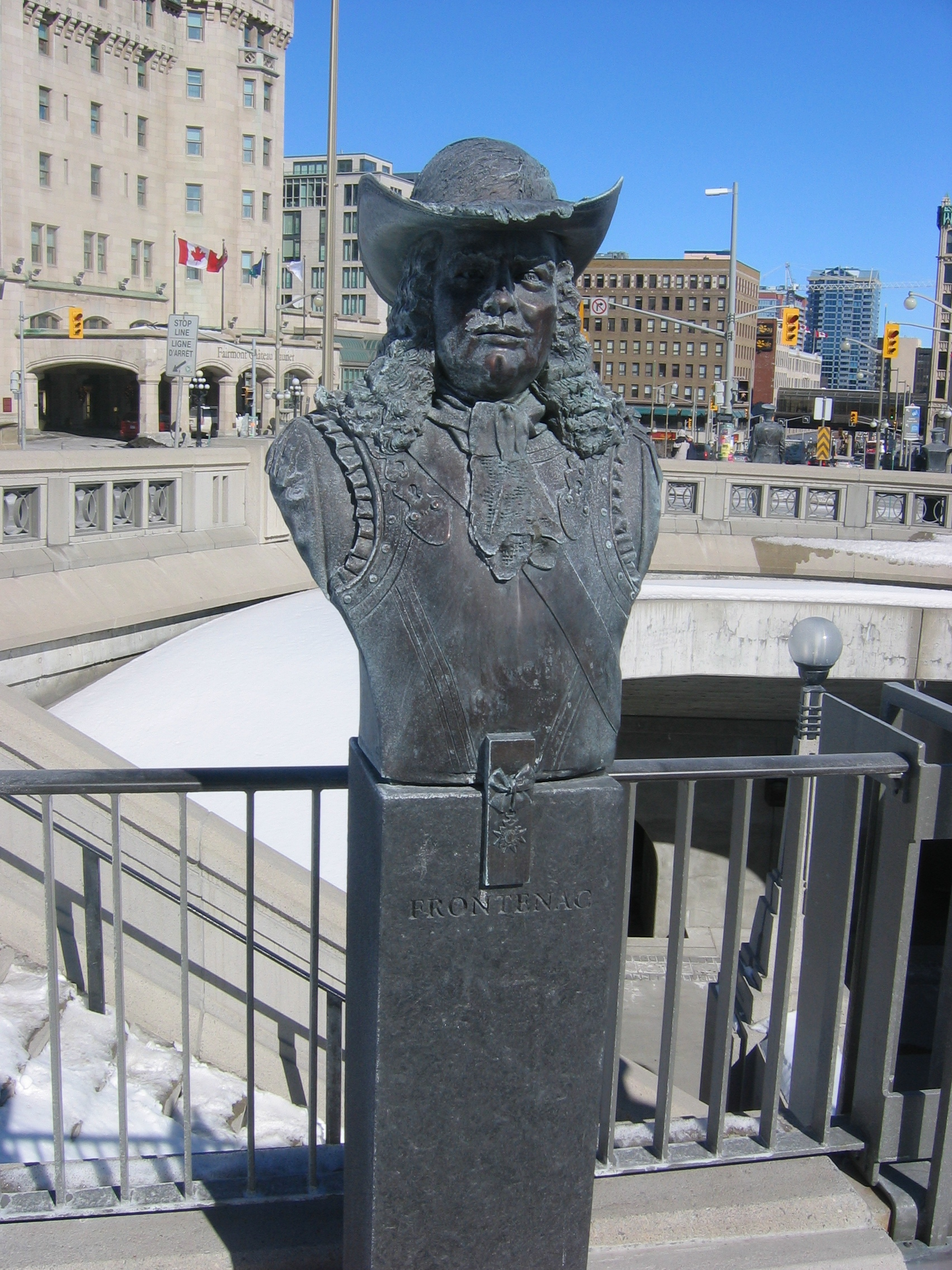
Statue of Frontenac at Quebec's Parliament Building in Quebec City (left), and a bust at Valiants Memorial in Ottawa

Many sites and landmarks were named to honour Louis de Buade de Frontenac. They include:

- Fort de Buade, St. Ignace, Michigan, United States
- Le Château Frontenac, located in Québec City, Québec, Canada
- Frontenac National Park in Québec, Canada.
- Avenue Frontenac, located in Shawinigan, Quebec, Canada
- Rue Frontenac and Métro Frontenac, in Montréal, Québec, Canada
- Frontenac Street, located in Sudbury, Ontario, Canada;
- The provincial electoral district of Frontenac, Quebec.
- Frontenac County, Ontario, the sites of Fort Frontenac
- Frontenac, Missouri, a wealthy suburb of St. Louis.
- Frontenac, Minnesota, an old resort town on the Mississippi River.
- Forward Operating Base Frontenac, Argandab Valley, Afghanistan
- The Frontenac rose, developed by Agriculture and Agri-Food Canada.
- The Kingston Frontenacs team of the Ontario Hockey League
- Frontenac Squadron at the Royal Military College of Canada
- Frontenac School and Frontenac Park in the Windsor Park neighbourhood of Winnipeg, Manitoba, Canada
- Frontenac Public School and Frontenac Park in Burlington, Ontario, Canada
- Frontenac Axis: One of the few outcroppings of the Canadian Shield to extend into the United States; situated at Kingston, Ontario and upper New York State.
- Frontenac, Kansas is the second largest city in Crawford County.

== Folklore ==
External videos
- "Governor Frontenac " – Historica Canada. - Heritage Minutes (1:01 min)

Frontenac's coat of arms marks the entrance to the Château, part of which lies on the site of his former home. Some claim to have spotted him, dressed in 17th-century garb while he wandering the halls or floating through the ballroom.

== Notes ==
Government offices
| Preceded by Daniel de Courcelle | Governor General of New France; 1672–1682 | Succeeded by Joseph-Antoine de La Barre |
| Preceded by Marquis de Denonville | Governor General of New France; 1689–1698 | Succeeded by Hector de Callière |
