= Lessard Seignory (Bas-Saint-Laurent) =

Coordinates: 48.4833°N 68.4000°W

Lessard Seignory (Quebec)

The Lessard Seignory (in French: seigneurie Lessard) was a seignory during the French colonisation of New France. It was located in the present-day Rimouski-Neigette Regional County Municipality in Bas-Saint-Laurent.

== History ==
The Lessard Seignory, measuring a league and a half by two leagues, was granted to Pierre Lessard and his wife, Barbe Fortin, on March 8, 1696. The western limit of its territory was the Point au Père on the Saint Lawrence River. Pierre Lessard and his wife were also seignors of the Lessard Seignory located in the present L'Islet Regional County Municipality.
