= Jacques Duchesneau de la Doussinière et d'Ambault =

Jacques Duchesneau de la Doussinière et d'Ambault, chevalier (French pronunciation: [ʒak dyʃɛno də la dusinjɛʁ e dɑ̃bo]; died 1696, Ambrault, near Issoudun, Berry), was intendant of New France from 1675 to 1682. His other offices included counsellor to His Majesty, treasurer of France, commissary for the generality of Tours c. 1664 and general of the king's finances in Touraine. He was the son of Guillaume Chesneau, chevalier, seigneur, cup-bearer to the king, and of Anne de Lalande.

== Sources ==
- Lamontagne, Léopold (1979) [1966]. "Duchesneau de la Doussinière et d'Ambault, Jacques". In Brown, George Williams (ed.). Dictionary of Canadian Biography. Vol. I (1000–1700) (online ed.). University of Toronto Press.
