= Intendant of New France =

French colonial administrative position

The Intendant of New France was an administrative position in the French colony of New France. He controlled the colony's entire civil administration. He gave particular attention to settlement and economic development, and to the administration of justice. The office of the Intendant of New France was created by Louis XIV. In 1663, Louis and his minister decided to give New France a new constitution. The charter of the One Hundred Associates was cancelled and the old Council of Quebec, which was formed in 1647, reorganized and became the Sovereign Council of New France. The Sovereign Council was composed of the governor, the bishop, the intendant, an attorney-general, a secretary, and five councillors. Because the Intendant of New France managed the financial matters like money and so on, as well as the infrastructure of the colony, he had an enormous amount of influence in the colony's government.

== Origin of the position ==
During the century and a half preceding the French Revolution, the main administrative organization of France was known as the Généralité. At the head of this division was placed the Intendant of Justice, Police and Finance. The intendant was, according to W. B. Munro, "armed with very extensive administrative powers, distinguished by his loyalty to the interests of the king, and in a sense reflecting the absolutism of the monarchy." The intendant was bound to no authorities, statutes or regulations. He was appointed by, removable by, and responsible to the King alone.

In France, the intendants had an essential role to play in the administrative machinery. According to Pierre Clément, they were required to deal with acts of oppression by officials, to the death penalty. Additionally, they kept watching over provisions, supplies and the condition of the prisons. The attorneys-general informed the intendants of all abuses committed in the province. Furthermore, they reviewed the troops in order to make sure that they were well equipped, and judged soldiers without appeal. Lastly, they were concerned with taxes and infrastructure such as roads, canals, and mines.

Historically, this position had been originally attributed to Cardinal Richelieu. However, this position was actually in existence long before the time of Richelieu. Its powers were so well developed by the first quarter of the seventeenth century that the cardinal-minister could have found little to add to them.

== Power shift ==
Prior to the establishment of the Intendant of New France and the Sovereign Council, the Governor shared legislative, executive and judicial powers with the old Council of Quebec, which was established by the royal statues of 1647 and 1648. The council was supposed to keep the power of governor in check; however in reality, the governor held great influence over the Council through practicing the right of veto. The governor and his successors enjoyed their authority in New France without restraint. At the beginning of 1663, the Company of One Hundred Associates (Compagnie des Cent-Associés) was dissolved and New France became a royal possession once more.

The appointment of the intendant by Louis XIV and Jean-Baptiste Colbert was an attempt to correct the weakened state of New France and intervene before it was too late. The intendant was to reorganize New France. The governor's powers were greatly reduced and many were transferred to the intendant and the Sovereign Council. The intendant became responsible for all the civil administration.

The Sovereign Council was introduced on September 18, 1663, as means to lessen the Governor's power. Indeed, it was not uncommon for governors to overstep their boundaries. Under the Sovereign Council, power shifted, or rather, became more divided, so that "what formerly constituted in great measure to the functions of the Governor, was given to the Council." The Intendant received power to reestablish order and security and to carry out important responsibilities in governing the colony of New France.

== Intendants in New France ==
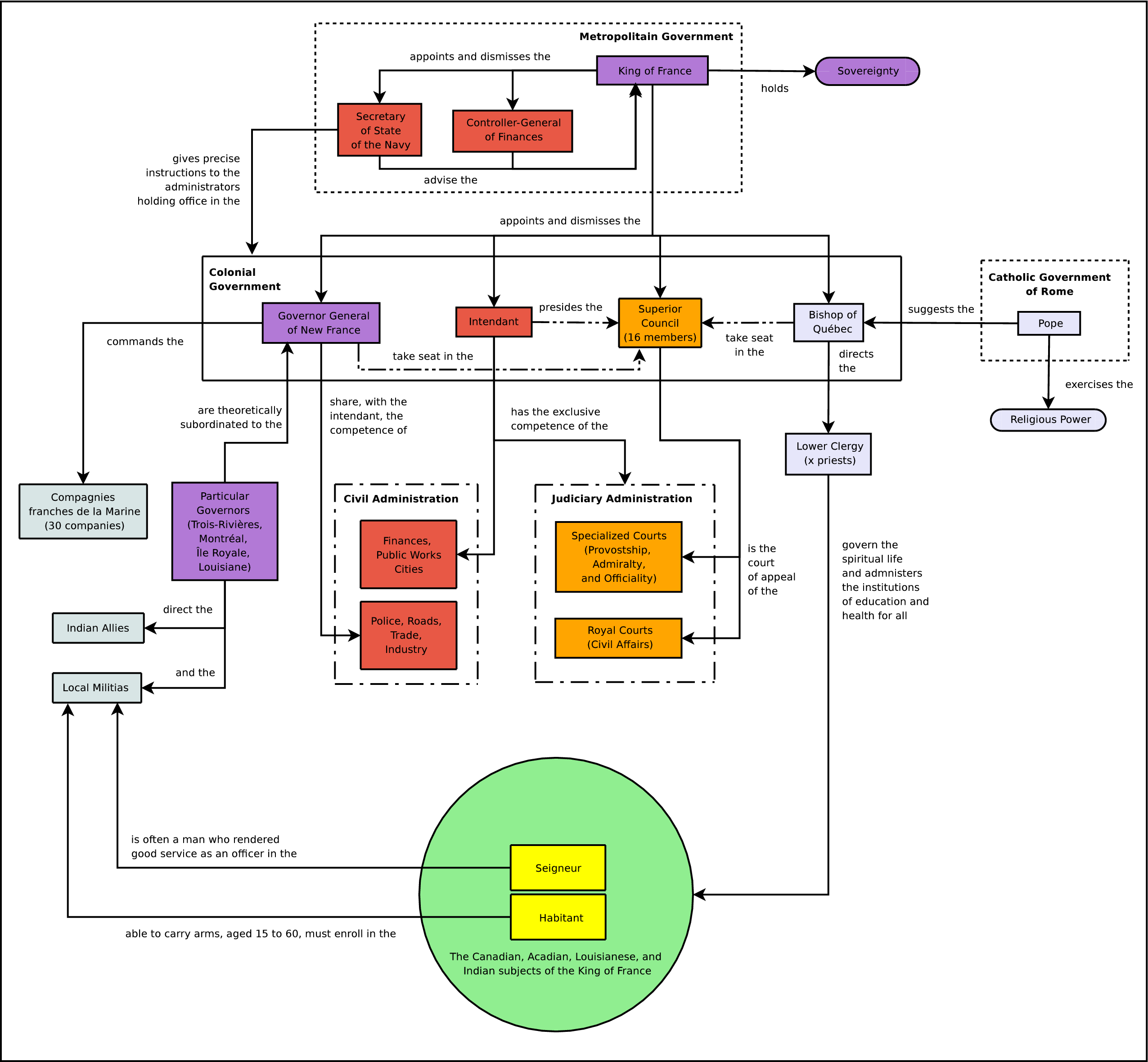
A chart showing the political organization of New France (circa 1759)

The office of the intendant first made its appearance in connection with the affairs of New France in the spring of 1663. On the advice of Colbert, the king had decided to provide New France with a new framework of government modelled in general upon that of a French province. In April 1663 an edict constituting the new administration was issued. As part of this administration, the intendant, who was trained in Finance, Law and Accounting, would be primarily in charge of the finances of the colony. The king normally appointed intendants from the royal service. These were men who entered the service at an early age and had been promoted as the result of tested fidelity to the interests of the monarchy and of industry shown in office.

The Intendants of New France were not appointed for a fixed number of years. In practice, the terms varied considerably, but according to Munro, "the average term of tenure was about eight and one-half years." The position was not something that everyone wanted, because it had enormous responsibilities and a heavy workload. In addition, the pay was low for this time in history: twelve thousand livres per year. However, those that did accept the position saw it as a stepping-stone to something greater. Consequently, they strove to conduct themselves so as to win the favour of the crown.

According to Munro, "each intendant received from the king a commission of appointment setting forth his jurisdiction and powers." These commissions varied but disclosed a broad line of uniformity. These commissions were expressed in such general terms, Munro argued, "that the intendant was the real agent of administration in the colony." The duties of the intendant were to oversee justice, finances and policing in the colony. He presided over the Sovereign Council and acted as a judge. He was also responsible for establishing regulations relative to the police, commerce, market prices, currency, militia, and seigniorial rights. Nevertheless, the intendant lacked any power over the military. He was answerable only to the Minister of Marine.

== See also ==
- List of seignories of Quebec
