= New France =

Area colonized by France in North America

New France Nouvelle-France (French)
- 1534–1763
- Flag (Note: The Royal Banner of early modern France or "Bourbon Flag" was the most commonly used flag in New France.) Coat of arms (Note: Lesser version of the coat of arms as used by the French Government)
- Motto: "Montjoie Saint Denis!" (French); "Mountjoy Saint Denis!"
- Anthem: Marche Henri IV ("March of Henri IV")
- Territory claimed by New France in 1712, before the Treaty of Utrecht
- Status: Viceroyalty of the Kingdom of France (1534–1760); Colony under British military occupation (1760–1763)
- Capital: Quebec
- Official languages: French
- Religion: Catholic Church
- King of France
  - 1534–1547: Francis I (first)
  - 1715–1763: Louis XV (last)
- Viceroy of New France
  - 1534–1541: Jacques Cartier (first; as Governor of New France)
  - 1755–1760: Pierre de Rigaud de Vaudreuil (last)
- Legislature: Superior Council
- Historical era: Colonial/French and Indian War
  - Exploration of Canada begins with Jacques Cartier.: 24 July 1534
  - Louis XIV integrates New France into the royal domain, endows it with a new administration and founds the French West India Company.: 18 September 1663
  - By the Treaty of Utrecht, France cedes most of Acadia to the Kingdom of Great Britain as well as its claims on Newfoundland and Hudson's Bay.: 11 April 1713
  - By the Treaty of Paris, Louis XV cedes New France to Great Britain.: 10 February 1763

Population
  - 1754: 69,000
- Currency: Livre tournois
- Today part of: Canada; United States; Saint Pierre and Miquelon (Note: An overseas territory of France)

New France (Note: French: Nouvelle-France, pronounced [nuvɛl fʁɑ̃s]) was the territory colonized by France in mainland North America, beginning with the exploration of the Gulf of Saint Lawrence by Jacques Cartier in 1534 and ending with the cession of New France to Great Britain and Spain in 1763 under the Treaty of Paris.

A vast viceroyalty, New France consisted of five colonies at its peak in 1712, each with its own administration: Canada, the most developed colony, which was divided into the districts of Quebec (around what is now called Quebec City), Trois-Rivières, and Montreal; Hudson Bay; Acadia in the northeast; Terre-Neuve on the island of Newfoundland; and Louisiana. It extended from Newfoundland to the Canadian Prairies and from Hudson Bay to the Gulf of Mexico, including all the Great Lakes of North America. The continent-traversing Saint Lawrence and Mississippi rivers were means of carrying French influence through much of North America.

In the 16th century, the lands were used primarily to extract natural resources, such as furs, through trade with the various indigenous peoples. In the seventeenth century, successful settlements began in Acadia and in Quebec. In the 1713 Treaty of Utrecht, France ceded to Great Britain its claims over mainland Acadia, Hudson Bay, and Newfoundland. France established the colony of Île Royale on Cape Breton Island, where they built the Fortress of Louisbourg.

The population rose slowly but steadily. In 1754, New France's population consisted of 10,000 Acadians, 55,000 Canadiens, and about 4,000 settlers in upper and lower Louisiana; 69,000 in total. The British expelled the Acadians in the Great Upheaval from 1755 to 1764, and their descendants are dispersed in the Maritime provinces of Canada and in Maine and Louisiana, with small populations in Chéticamp, Nova Scotia, and the Magdalen Islands. Some also went to France.

After the Seven Years' War (which included the French and Indian War in America), France ceded the rest of New France to Great Britain and Spain in the Treaty of Paris of 1763, although fishing rights around Newfoundland were retained. To assist with those fishing rights, Great Britain returned the islands of Saint Pierre and Miquelon, which had been lost in 1713. Britain acquired Canada, Acadia, and French Louisiana east of the Mississippi River, except for the Île d'Orléans, which was granted to Spain with the territory to the west. In 1800, Spain returned its portion of Louisiana to France under the secret Treaty of San Ildefonso, and Napoleon Bonaparte sold it to the United States in the Louisiana Purchase of 1803, permanently ending French colonial efforts on the North American mainland.

New France eventually became absorbed within the United States and Canada, with the only vestige of French rule being the tiny islands of Saint Pierre and Miquelon, an overseas collectivity of France, although Quebec remains predominantly French-speaking. In the United States, the legacy of New France includes numerous place names as well as small pockets of French-speaking communities.

== Settlements of New France ==
Map of territorial claims in North America by 1750, before the French and Indian War, which was part of the greater worldwide conflict known as the Seven Years' War (1756 to 1763). Possessions of Britain (pink), France (blue), and Spain. (White border lines mark later Canadian Provinces and US States for reference)

New France had five loosely defined colonies or territories, each with its own administration:

- Acadia (1604–1763) — (areas, Port Royal, Île Saint-Jean, Île-Royale, New Brunswick and Maine)
- Canada (1608–1763) — (districts, Québec, Trois-Rivières and Montreal; areas, Pays d'en Haut and Domaine du roy)
- Hudson Bay — (Hudson Bay conflicts 17th and 18th centuries)
- Terre-Neuve (1662–1713)
- Louisiana (1682–1763, 1801–1803) — (district, Illinois Country; area, Ohio Country)

The 1715 Treaty of Utrecht resulted in the relinquishing of French claims to mainland Acadia, the Hudson Bay and Newfoundland, and the establishment of the colony of Île Royale, now called Cape Breton Island, where the French built the Fortress of Louisbourg.

=== Growth of the settlements ===
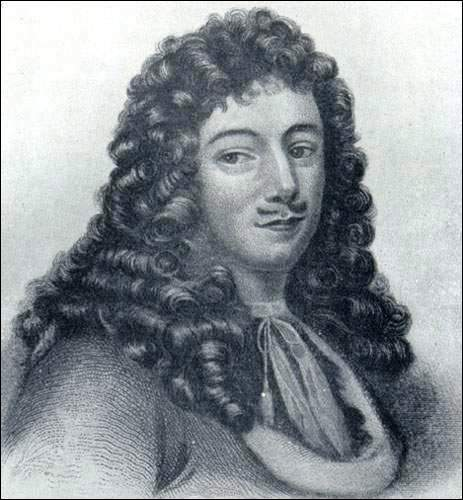
Jean Talon, count of Orsainville, first intendant of New France

The European population grew slowly under French rule, thus remained relatively low as growth was largely achieved through natural births, rather than by immigration. Most of the French were farmers, and the rate of natural increase among the settlers themselves was very high. The women had about 30 per cent more children than their counterparts who remained in France. Yves Landry says, "Canadians had an exceptional diet for their time." The 1666 census of New France was the first census conducted in North America. It was organized by Jean Talon, the first Intendant of New France, between 1665 and 1666. According to Talon's census there were 3,215 people in New France, comprising 538 separate families. The census showed a great difference in the number of men at 2,034 versus 1,181 women. The French government sought to rectify this over the next few years by sending approximately 800 unmarried women, known as the Filles du Roi ("King's Daughters"), to the colony.

By the early 1700s, the New France settlers were well established along the Saint Lawrence River and Acadian Peninsula with a population around 15,000-16,000. The first population figures for Acadia are from 1671, which enumerated only 450 people.

After the Treaty of Utrecht in 1713, New France began to prosper. Industries such as fishing and farming, which had failed under Talon, began to flourish. A "King's Highway" (Chemin du Roy) was built between Montreal and Quebec to encourage faster trade. The shipping industry also flourished as new ports were built and old ones were upgraded. The number of colonists greatly increased. By 1720, Canada had become a self-sufficient colony with a population of 24,594. Mainly due to natural increase and modest immigration from Northwest France (Brittany, Normandy, Île-de-France, Poitou-Charentes and Pays de la Loire) the population of Canada increased to 55,000 according to the last French census of 1754. This was an increase from 42,701 in 1730. By 1765, the population approached 70,000.

By 1714, the Acadian population had expanded to over 2,500, and by the end of the 1750s it had reached about 13,000. This was mostly from natural increase rather than immigration that affected other French settlements.

The European population of Louisiana is estimated at 5,000 by the 1720s. However, by the mid-1730s the colony had suffered the loss of 2,000 French settlers, though it added African slaves. Enslaved men, women and children represented approximately 65 percent of the 6,000 non-indigenous population of Louisiana by the end of French rule.

== History ==
=== Early exploration (1523–1650s) ===
Around 1523, the Florentine navigator Giovanni da Verrazzano convinced King Francis I to commission an expedition to find a western route to Cathay (China). Late that year, Verrazzano set sail in Dieppe, crossing the Atlantic on a small caravel with 50 men. After exploring the coast of the present-day Carolinas early the following year, he headed north along the coast, eventually anchoring in the Narrows of New York Bay.

The first European to visit the site of present-day New York, Verrazzano named it Nouvelle-Angoulême in honour of the king, the former count of Angoulême. Verrazzano's voyage convinced the king to seek to establish a colony in the newly discovered land. Verrazzano gave the names Francesca and Nova Gallia to that land between New Spain (Mexico) and English Newfoundland.

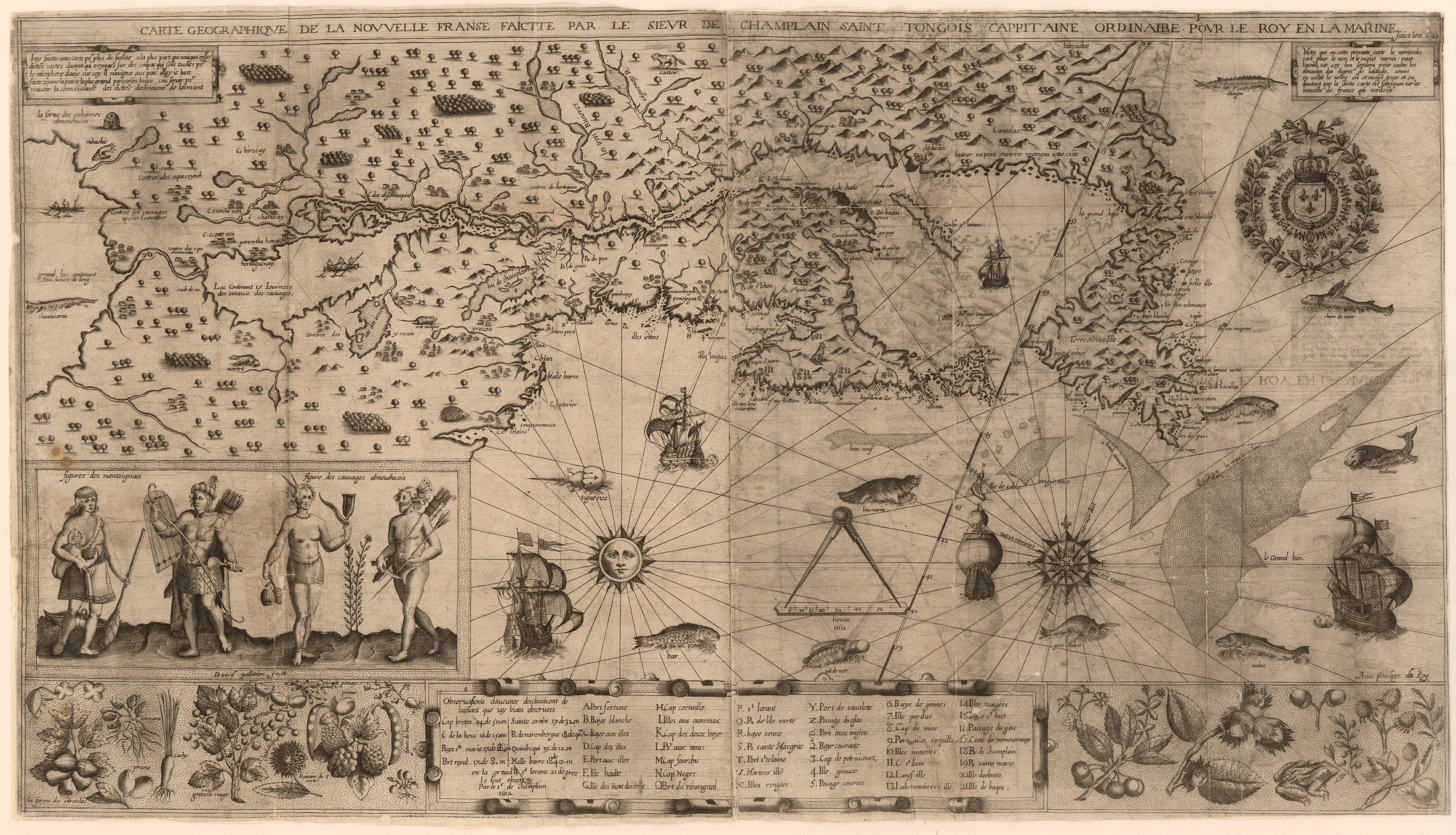
A map of New France made by Samuel de Champlain in 1612

In 1534, Jacques Cartier planted a cross in the Gaspé Peninsula and claimed the land in the name of King Francis I. It was the first province of New France. The first settlement of 400 people, Fort Charlesbourg-Royal (present-day Quebec City), was attempted in 1541 but lasted only two years.

French fishing fleets continued to sail to the Atlantic coast and into the St. Lawrence River, making alliances with Canadian First Nations that became important once France began to occupy the land. French merchants soon realized the St. Lawrence region was full of valuable fur-bearing animals, especially the beaver, which were becoming rare in Europe. Eventually, the French crown decided to colonize the territory to secure and expand its influence in America.

Acadia and Canada (New France) were inhabited by indigenous nomadic Algonquian peoples and sedentary Iroquoian peoples. These lands were full of unexploited and valuable natural resources, which attracted all of Europe. By the 1580s, French trading companies had been set up, and ships were contracted to bring back furs. Much of what transpired between the indigenous population and their European visitors around that time is not known, for lack of historical records.

Other attempts at establishing permanent settlements were also failures. In 1598, a French trading post was established on Sable Island, off the coast of Acadia, but was unsuccessful. In 1600, a trading post was established at Tadoussac, but only five settlers survived the winter.

==== Foundation and development of Port Royal (1605) ====
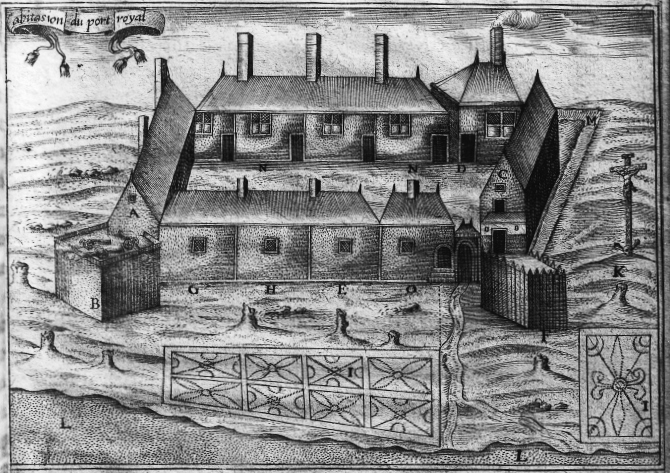
Habitation at Port-Royal c. 1605

In 1604, King Henri IV sponsored Pierre Dugua, Sieur de Mons to found a settlement in New France. It was initially located at Île-Saint-Croix in modern-day Maine, which was moved to Port-Royal, Acadia, in modern day Nova Scotia, in 1605. Early participants in Port Royal included Samuel de Champlain and Jean de Biencourt de Poutrincourt et de Saint-Just.

The first seigneury in New France, was granted to Poutrincourt in 1604, who actively promoted its development. By 1607, New France's first grist mill was established on the seigneury. Poutrincourt invited Louis Hébert to Port Royal where he pioneered many European agricultural practices in the New World, including viticulture, arboriculture and cereal farming, before relocating to Quebec in 1617.

The principal structure of early Port Royal, the habitation, was destroyed in 1613, after which settlers moved to other nearby locations. Port Royal was the first successful attempt by Europeans to establish a permanent settlement in New France. Although the French, notably Charles de Saint-Étienne de la Tour, remained active after 1613, official support for Port Royal resumed only in 1632. Control of Port Royal and Acadia shifted between Britain and France until Britain permanently took it in 1712. The Acadians remained dominant until their deportation began in 1755. Allowed to return in 1764 if they swore allegiance, Acadians today form a significant French-speaking community in New Brunswick and Nova Scotia.

==== Foundation of Quebec City (1608) ====
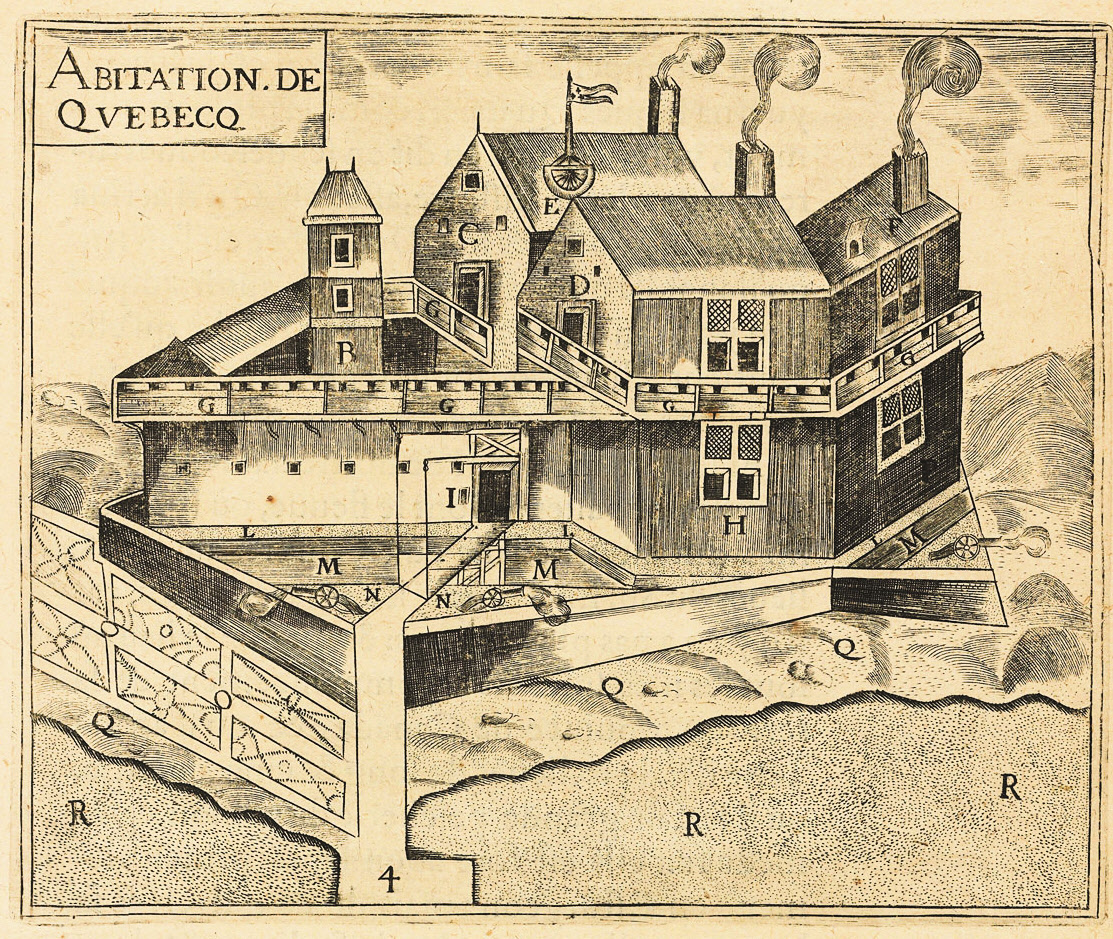
Habitation at Quebec c. 1608

In 1608, King Henry IV sponsored Pierre Dugua, Sieur de Mons and Samuel de Champlain as founders of the city of Quebec with 28 men. This was the second permanent French settlement in the colony of Canada. Colonization was slow and difficult. Many settlers died early because of harsh weather and diseases. In 1630, there were only 103 colonists living in the settlement, but by 1640, the population had reached 355.

Champlain allied himself with the Algonquin and Innu (Montagnais) peoples in the area, who were at war with the Haudenosaunee (Iroquois), as soon as possible. In 1609, Champlain and two French companions accompanied his Algonquin, Innu, and Wendat (Huron) allies south from the St. Lawrence Valley to Lake Champlain. He participated decisively in a battle against the Haudenosaunee there, killing two Haudenosaunee chiefs with the first shot of his arquebus. This military engagement against the Haudenosaunee solidified Champlain's status with New France's Wendat and Algonquin allies, enabling him to maintain bonds essential to New France's interests in the fur trade.

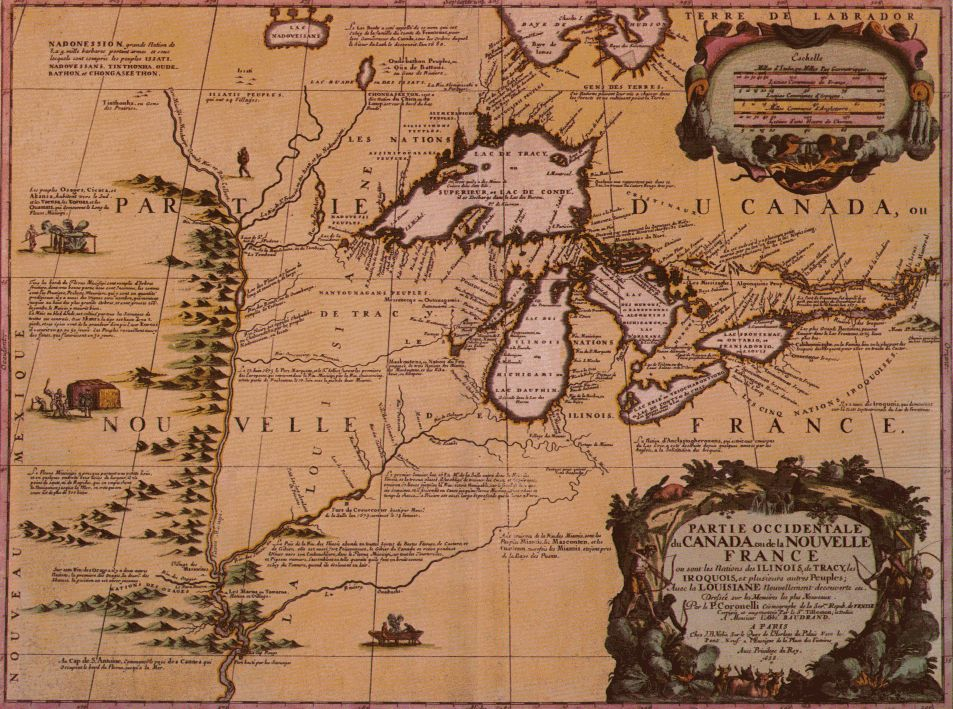
A map of western New France, including the Illinois Country, by Vincenzo Coronelli, 1688

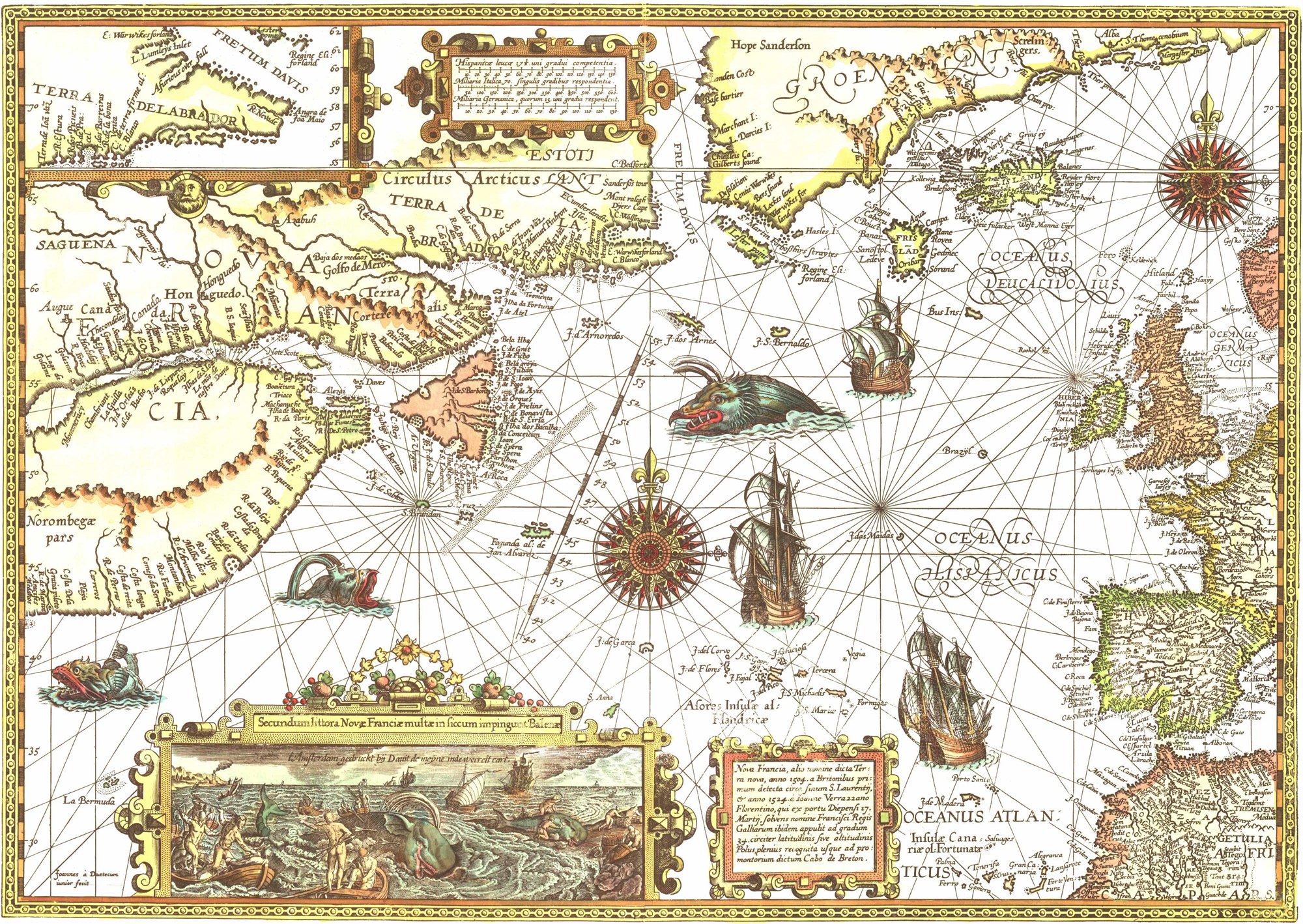
1592 map of New France by Petrus Plancius

Champlain also arranged to have young French men live with local indigenous people, to learn their language and customs and help the French adapt to life in North America. These coureurs des bois ("runners of the woods"), including Étienne Brûlé, extended French influence south and west to the Great Lakes and among the Wendat tribes who lived there. Ultimately, for the better part of a century, the Haudenosaunee and French clashed in a series of attacks and reprisals.

During the first decades of the colony's existence, only a few hundred French people lived there, while the English colonies to the south were much more populous and wealthy. Cardinal Richelieu, adviser to Louis XIII, wished to make New France as significant as the English colonies. In 1627, Richelieu founded the Company of One Hundred Associates to invest in New France, promising land parcels to hundreds of new settlers and to turn Canada into an important mercantile and farming colony. He named Champlain as the Governor of New France and forbade non-Catholics to live there. Consequently, any Protestant emigrants to New France were forced to convert to Catholicism, prompting many of them to relocate to the English colonies instead.

The Catholic Church, and missionaries such as the Recollets and the Jesuits, became firmly established in the territory. Richelieu also expanded the seigneurial system from its beginnings at Port-Royal. This was a semi-feudal system of farming based on ribbon farms that remained a characteristic feature of the St. Lawrence valley until the 19th century. While Richelieu's efforts did little to increase the French presence in New France, they did pave the way for the success of later efforts.

Simultaneously, during the Anglo-French War (1627–1629) the English colonies to the south began raiding the St. Lawrence Valley, Champlain surrendered Quebec on 19 July 1629. The British held New France with Kirke as governor until 1632, when Treaty of Saint-Germain-en-Laye (1632) was signed on March 29, 1632, which returned New France (Quebec, Acadia and Cape Breton Island) to French control. Champlain returned to Canada that year and requested that Sieur de Laviolette found another trading post at Trois-Rivières, which Laviolette did in 1634. Champlain died in 1635.

On 23 September 1646, under the command of Pierre LeGardeur, Le Cardinal arrived to Quebec with Jules (Gilles) Trottier II and his family. Le Cardinal, commissioned by the Communauté des Habitants, had arrived from La Rochelle, France. Communauté des Habitants at the time of Trottier traded fur primarily. On 4 July 1646, by Pierre Teuleron, sieur de Repentigny, granted Trottier land in La Rochelle to build and develop New France, under the authorization Jacques Le Neuf de la Poterie.

=== Royal takeover and attempts to settle ===
The Merchant Flag of France (1689 design), inspiration for the flag of Quebec

In 1650, New France had seven hundred colonists and Montreal had only a few dozen settlers. Because the First Nations people did most of the work of beaver hunting, the company needed few French employees. The sparsely populated New France almost fell to hostile Haudenosaunee forces completely as well. In 1660, settler Adam Dollard des Ormeaux led a Canadian and Wendat militia against a much larger Haudenosaunee force; none of the Canadians survived, although they did turn back the Haudenosaunee invasion.

In 1627, Quebec had only eighty-five French colonists and was easily overwhelmed two years later when three English privateers plundered the settlement. In 1663, New France finally became more secure when Louis XIV made it a royal province, taking control away from the Company of One Hundred Associates. In the same year the Société Notre-Dame de Montréal ceded its possessions to the Seminaire de Saint-Sulpice.

The Crown paid for transatlantic passages and offered other incentives to those willing to move to New France as well, after which the population of New France grew to three thousand.

In 1665, Louis XIV sent a French garrison, the Carignan-Salières Regiment, to Quebec. The colonial government was reformed along the lines of the government of France, with the Governor General and Intendant subordinate to the French Minister of the Marine. In 1665, Jean Talon Minister of the Marine accepted an appointment from Jean-Baptiste Colbert as the first Intendant of New France. These reforms limited the power of the Bishop of Quebec, who had held the greatest amount of power after the death of Champlain.

Talon tried reforming the seigneurial system by forcing the seigneurs to reside on their land and limiting the size of the seigneuries, intending to make more land available to new settlers. Talon's attempts failed since very few settlers arrived and the various industries he established failed to surpass the importance of the fur trade.

==== Settlers and their families ====
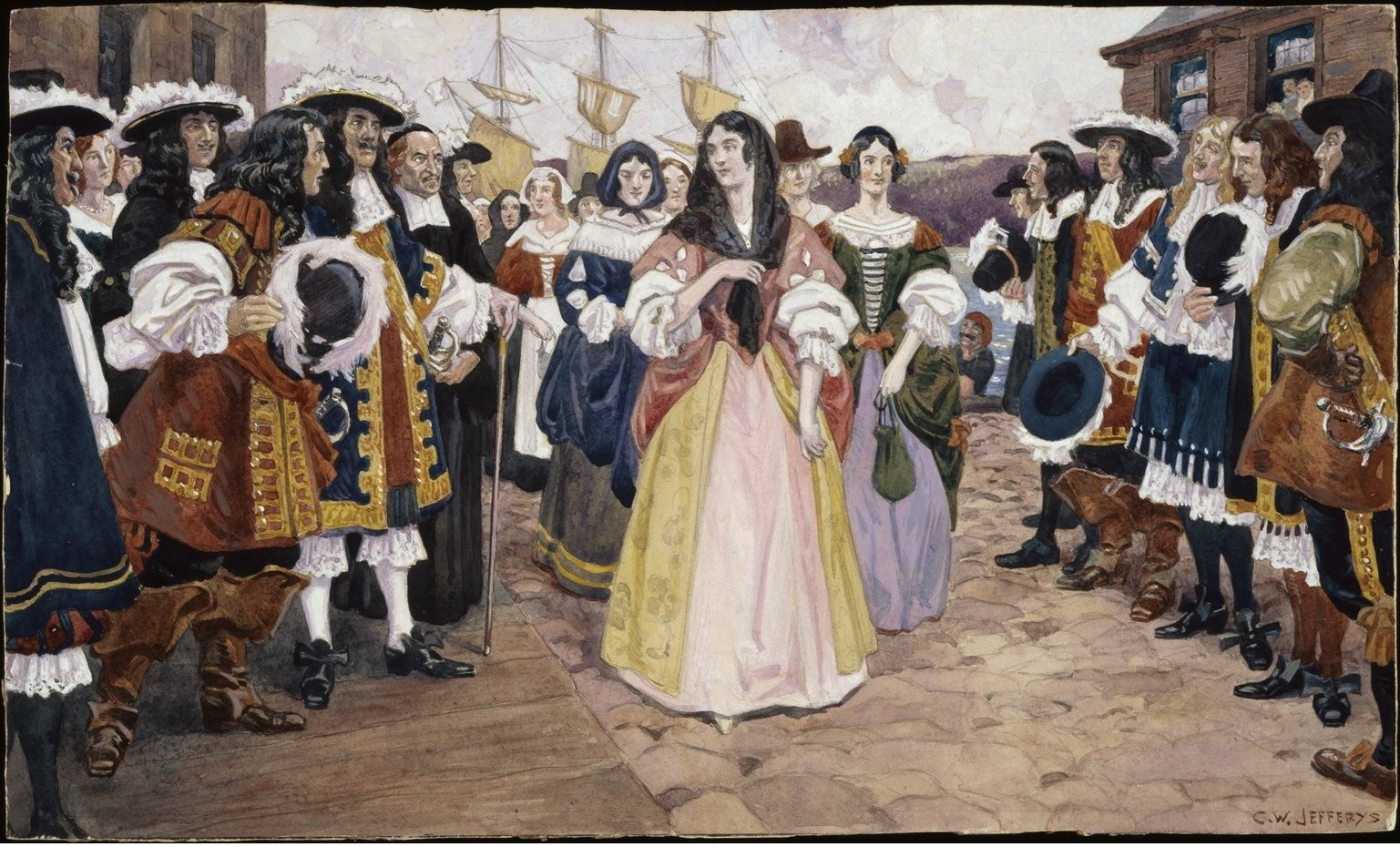
One group of King's Daughters arrives at Quebec, 1667

The first settler, brought to Quebec by Champlain, was the apothecary Louis Hébert and his family of Paris. They expressly came to settle and remain in New France so as to make the settlement viable. Waves of recruits came in response to the requests for men with specific skills, e.g., farmers, architects, and blacksmiths. At the same time, the government encouraged intermarriages with the indigenous peoples and welcomed indentured servants, or engagés sent to New France. As couples married, cash incentives to have large families were put in place and proved effective.

To further strengthen the nascent France's colonial empire, Louis XIV sponsored single women, virtuous, physically fit, and aged between 15 and 30 years, known as the King's Daughters, or, in French, les filles du roi, to move to New France. The King paid for their passage and granted goods or money as their dowries upon their marriage to single settlers. Approximately 800 women, primarily from the impoverished Parisian, Norman, and West-Central families, relocated during 1663–1673. By 1672, the population of New France had risen to 6,700 people, a marked increase from the population of 3,200 people in 1663.

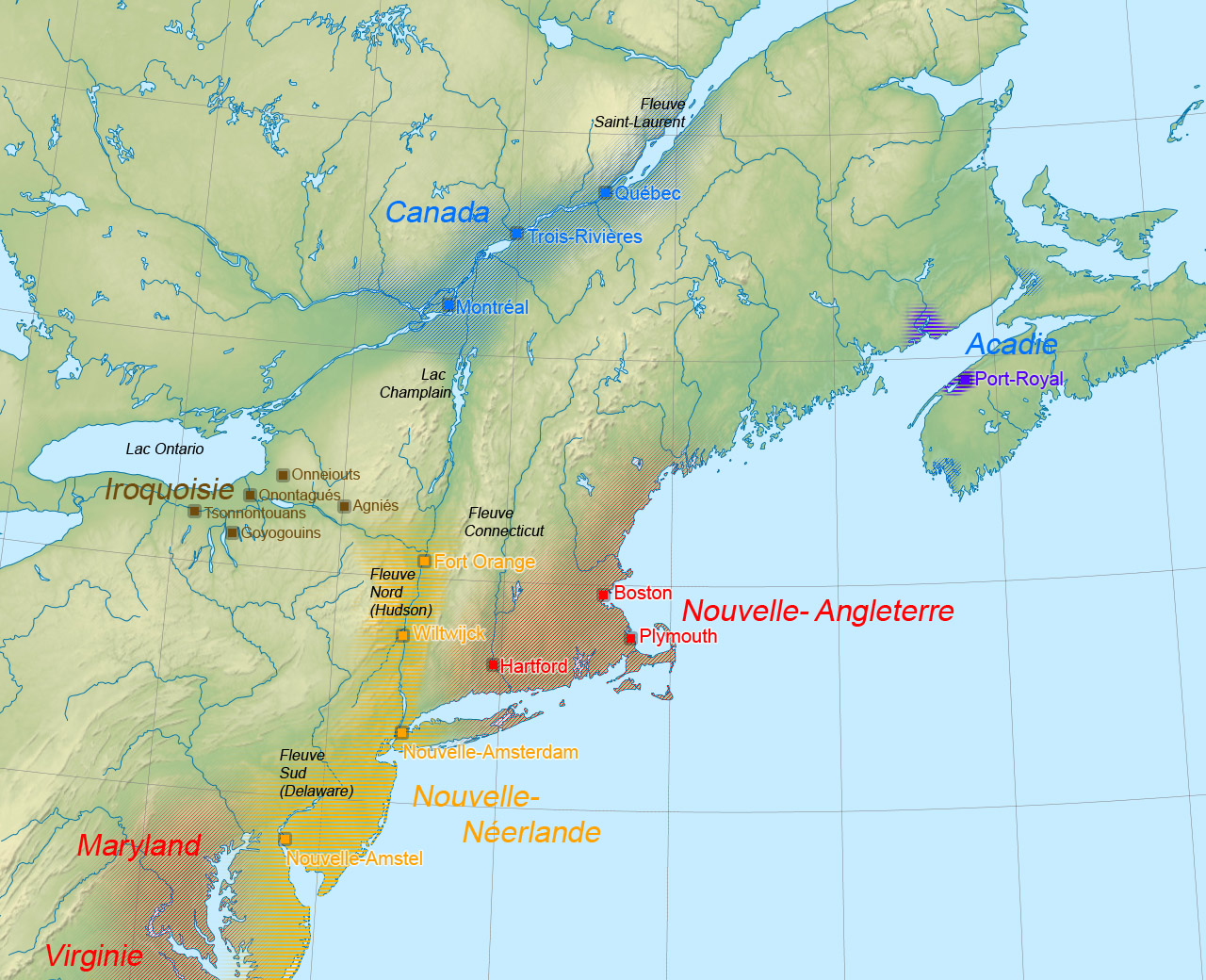
Political map of the northeastern part of North America in 1664

This rapid demographic growth was predicated both on the high demand for children and on the ready supply of natural resources to support them. According to Landry, "Canadians had an exceptional diet for their time. This was due to the natural abundance of meat, fish, and pure water; the good food conservation conditions during the winter; and an adequate wheat supply in most years." Consequently, colonial women bore about 30% more children than comparable women in France.

Besides household duties, some women participated in the fur trade, the major source of money in New France. They worked at home alongside their husbands or fathers as merchants, clerks, and provisioners. Some were widows who took over their husbands' roles. Some even became independent and active entrepreneurs.

==== Settlements in Louisiana ====
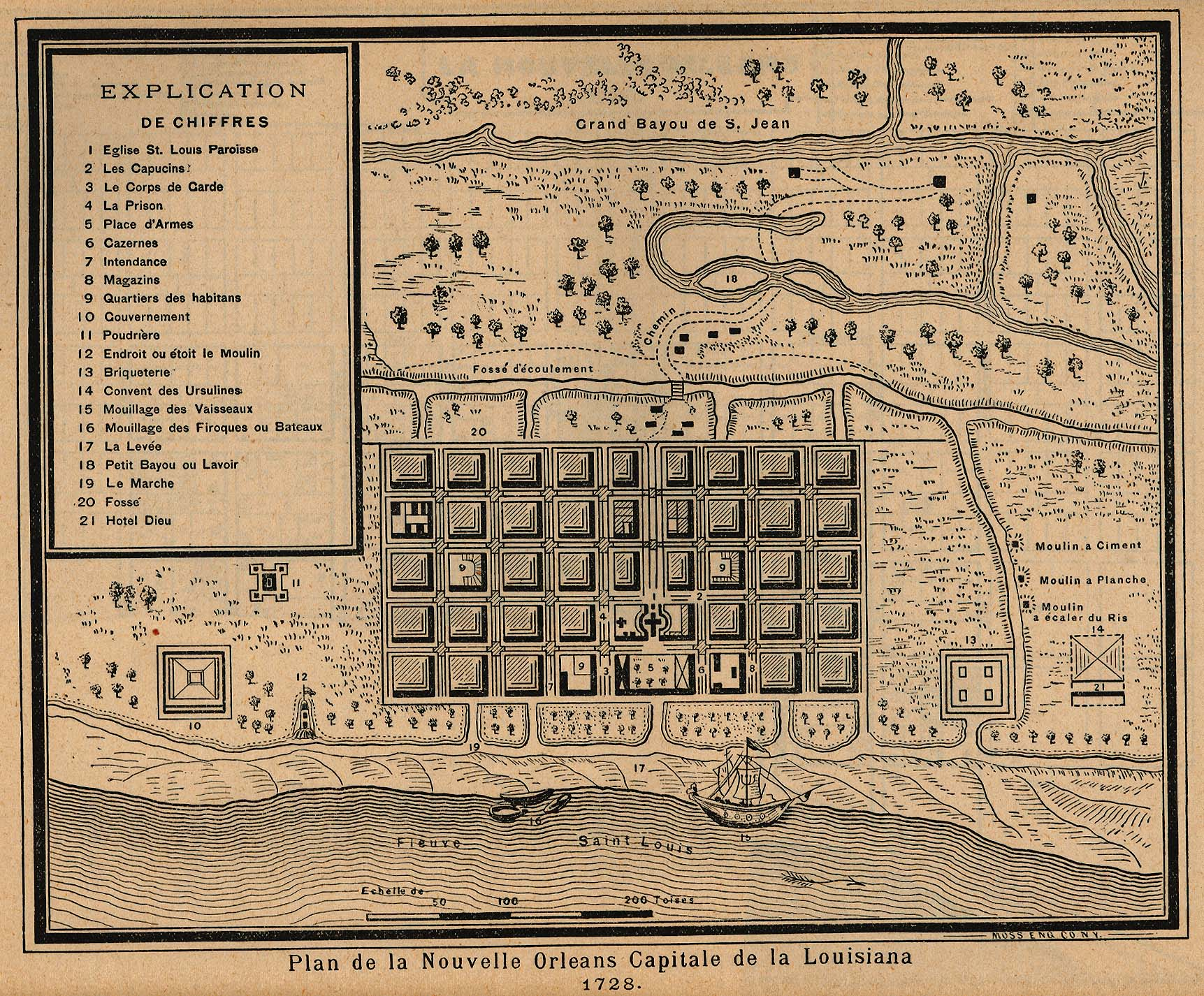
Map of New Orleans in 1728

The French extended their territorial claim to the south and to the west of the American colonies late in the 17th century, naming it for King Louis XIV, as La Louisiane. In 1682, René-Robert Cavelier, Sieur de La Salle explored the Ohio River Valley and the Mississippi River Valley, and he claimed the entire territory for France as far south as the Gulf of Mexico.

La Salle attempted to establish the first southern colony in the new territory in 1685, but inaccurate maps and navigational issues led him to instead establish his Fort Saint Louis in what is now Texas. The colony was devastated by disease, and the surviving settlers were killed in 1688, in an attack by the area's indigenous population. Other parts of Louisiana were settled and developed with success, such as New Orleans and southern Illinois, leaving a strong French influence in these areas long after the Louisiana Purchase.

Many strategic forts were built there, under the orders of Governor Louis de Buade de Frontenac. Forts were also built in the older portions of New France that had not yet been settled. Many of these forts were garrisoned by the Troupes de la Marine, the only regular soldiers in New France between 1683 and 1755.

=== Conquest of New France ===
The Conquest of New France occurred during the Seven Years' War, fought in North America between the Kingdom of Great Britain and the Kingdom of France. It started with a British campaign in 1758 and ended with the region being put under a British military regime between 1760 and 1763. Britain's acquisition of the French colony of Canada, which France had established in 1535, became official with the 1763 Treaty of Paris that concluded the Seven Years' War. The term is usually used when discussing the impact of the British conquest on the 70,000 French colonist inhabitants, as well as on the First Nations peoples. At issue in popular and scholarly debate ever since is the British treatment of the French settler population along with the long-term historical impacts of the conquest.

== Fur trade and economy ==
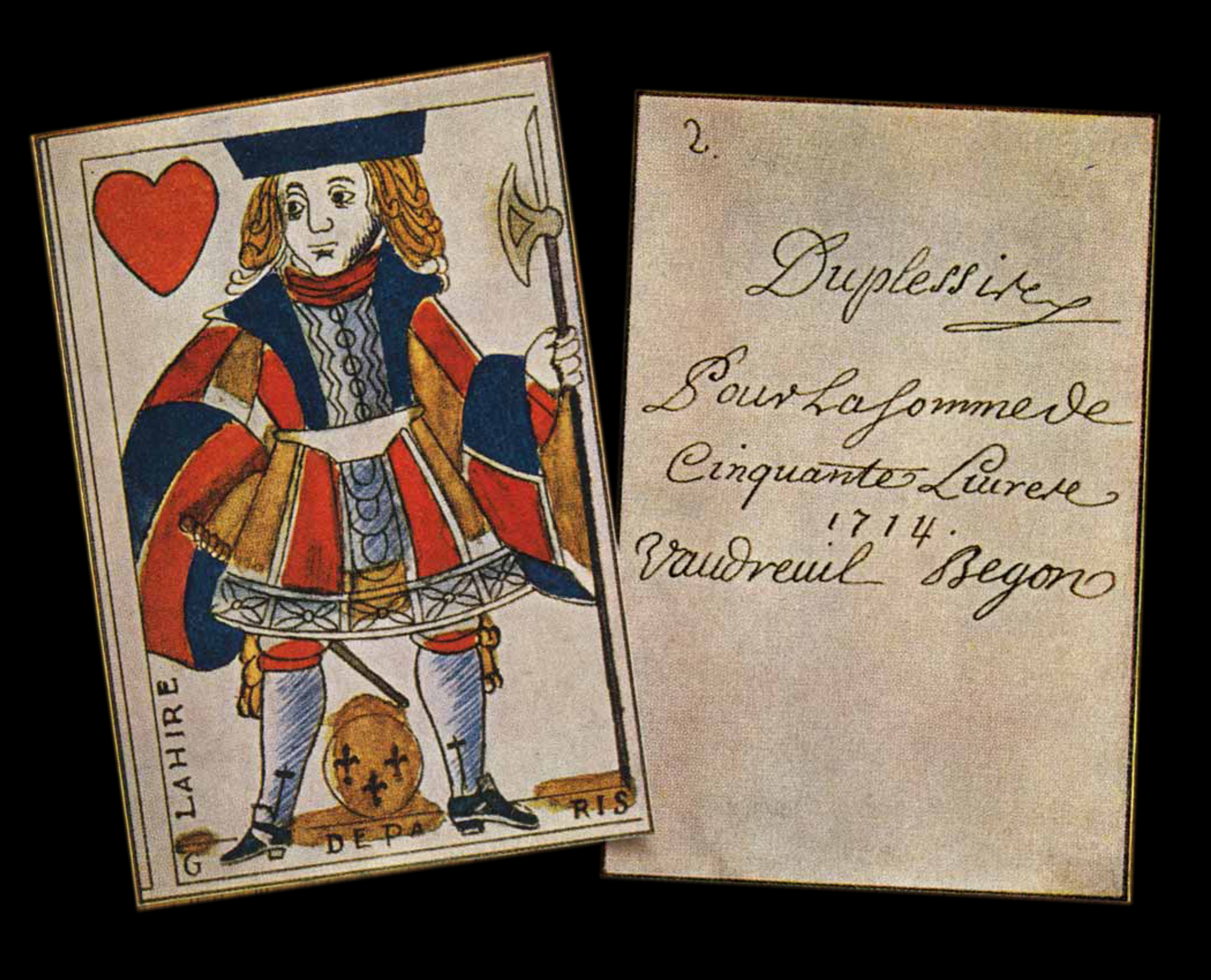
Card money in New France had the same currency value in the colony as minted currency, c. 1714

According to the staples thesis, the economic development of New France was marked by the emergence of successive economies based on staple commodities, each of which dictated the political and cultural settings of the time. During the 16th and early 17th centuries New France's economy was heavily centered on its Atlantic fisheries. This would change in the later half of the 17th and 18th centuries as French settlement penetrated further into the continental interior. Here French economic interests would shift and concentrate itself on the development of the North American fur trade. It would soon become the new staple good that would strengthen and drive New France's economy, in particular that of Montreal, for the next century.

The trading post of Ville-Marie, established on the current island of Montreal, quickly became the economic hub for the French fur trade. It achieved this in great part due to its particular location along the St. Lawrence River. From here a new economy emerged, one of size and density that provided increased economic opportunities for the inhabitants of New France. In December 1627 the Company of New France was recognized and given commercial rights to the gathering and export of furs from French territories. By trading with various indigenous populations and securing the main markets its power grew steadily for the next decade. As a result, it was able to set specific price points for furs and other valuable goods, often doing so to protect its economic hegemony over other trading partners and other areas of the economy.

The fur trade itself was based on a commodity of small bulk but high value. Because of this it managed to attract increased attention and/or input capital that would otherwise be intended for other areas of the economy. The Montreal area witnessed a stagnant agricultural sector; it remained for the most part subsistence orientated with little or no trade purposes outside of the French colony. This was a prime example of the handicapping effect the fur trade had on its neighbouring areas of the economy.

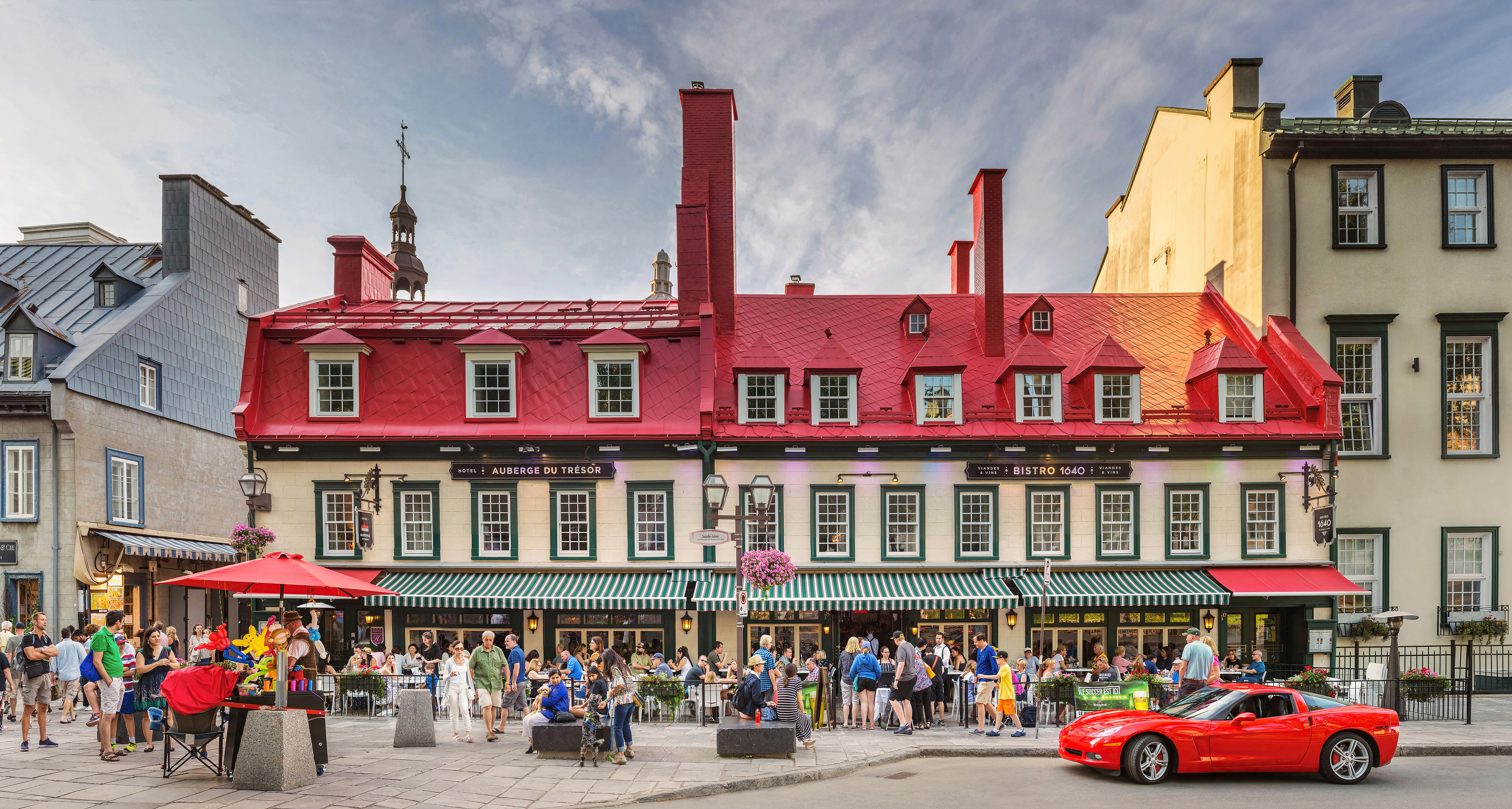
Company of New France building in present-day Quebec City

Nonetheless, by the beginning of the 1700s, the economic prosperity the fur trade stimulated slowly transformed Montreal. Economically, it was no longer a town of small traders or of fur fairs but rather a city of merchants and of bright lights. The primary sector of the fur trade, the act of acquiring and the selling of the furs, quickly promoted the growth of complementary second and tertiary sectors of the economy. For instance a small number of tanneries was established in Montreal as well as a larger number of inns, taverns and markets that would support the growing number of inhabitants whose livelihood depended on the fur trade. Already by 1683 there were well over 140 families and there may have been as many as 900 people living in Montreal.

The founding of John Law's Company in 1717, once again highlighted the economic importance of the fur trade. This merchant association, like its predecessor the Compagnie des Cent Associés, regulated the fur trade to the best of its abilities imposing price points, supporting government sale taxes and combating black market practices. However, by the middle half of the 18th century the fur trade was in a slow decline.

The natural abundance of furs had passed and it could no longer meet market demand. This eventually resulted in the repeal of the 25 percent sales tax that had previously aimed at curbing the administrative costs New France had accumulated. In addition, dwindling supply increased black market trading. A greater number of indigenous groups and fur traders began circumventing Montreal and New France altogether; many began trading with either British or Dutch merchants to the south.

By the end of French rule in New France in 1763, the fur trade had significantly lost its importance as the key staple good that supported much of New France's economy for more than the last century. Even so, it did serve as the fundamental force behind the establishment and vast growth of Montreal and the French colony.

=== Coureurs des bois and voyageurs ===
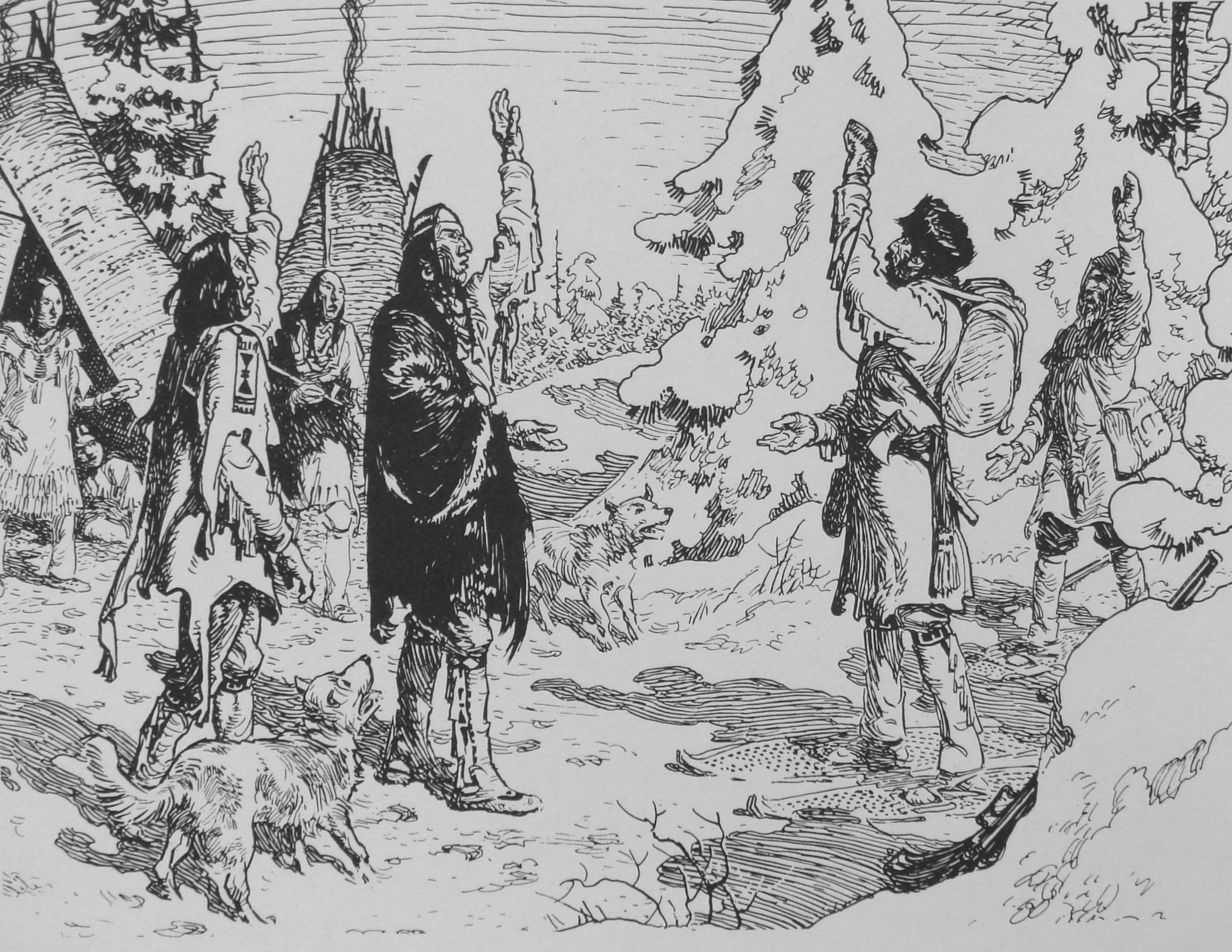
The arrival of Radisson in an Amerindian camp in 1660

The coureurs des bois were responsible for starting the flow of trade from Montreal, carrying French goods into upper territories while indigenous people were bringing down their furs. The coureurs traveled with intermediate trading tribes, and found that they were anxious to prevent French access to the more distant fur-hunting tribes. Still, the coureurs kept thrusting outwards using the Ottawa River as their initial step upon the journey and keeping Montreal as their starting point. The Ottawa River was significant because it offered a route that was practical for Europeans, by taking the traders northward out of the territory dominated by the Haudenosaunee. It was for this reason that Montreal and the Ottawa River was a central location of indigenous warfare and rivalry.

Montreal faced difficulties by having too many coureurs out in the woods. The furs coming down were causing an oversupply on the markets of Europe. This challenged the coureurs trade because they so easily evaded controls, monopolies, and taxation, and additionally because the coureurs trade was held to debauch both French and various indigenous groups. The coureur debauched Frenchmen by accustoming them to fully live with indigenous, and indigenous by trading on their desire for alcohol.

The issues caused a great rift in the colony, and in 1678, it was confirmed by a General Assembly that the trade was to be made in public so as to better assure the safety of the indigenous population. It was also forbidden to take spirits inland to trade with indigenous groups. However, these restrictions on the coureurs, for a variety of reasons, never worked. The fur trade remained dependent on spirits, and increasingly in the hands of the coureurs who journeyed north in search of furs.

As time passed, the Coureurs des bois were partially replaced by licensed fur trading endeavors, and the main canoe travel workers of those endeavors were called voyageurs.

=== Indigenous peoples ===
The French and Algonquins first encountered one another in 1603 after Samuel de Champlain established France's first permanent North American settlement along the St. Lawrence River. In 1610, the Algonquins continued to solidify their relations with the French by guiding Étienne Brûlé into the interiors of Canada.

The relationship between the Haudenosaunee and the French first began in 1609, when Samuel De Champlain engaged in battle against the Haudenosaunee. Champlain travelled from the St. Lawrence Valley, accompanied by his Algonquin, Innu, and Huron allies, and managed to kill three Iroquoian chiefs on Lake Champlain with the first shots of his arquebus. Subsequently, the two factions (Haudenosaunee and French) were constantly at war with one another until the Great Peace of Montréal in 1701.

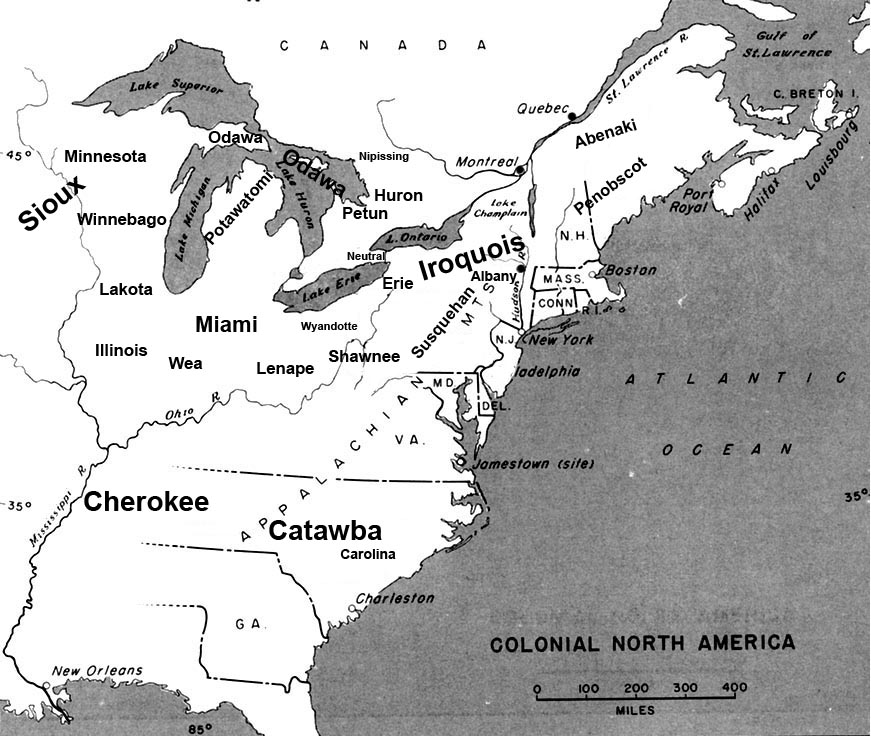
Map showing the approximate location of major Native American tribes and settlements

The French were interested in exploiting the land through the fur trade as well as the timber trade later on. Despite having tools and guns, the French settlers were dependent on Indigenous people to survive in the difficult climate in this part of North America. Many settlers did not know how to survive through the winter; the Indigenous people showed them how to survive in the New World. They showed the settlers how to hunt for food and to use the furs for clothing that would protect them during the winter months. Modern historians have highlighted that despite largely functional relations with indigenous peoples, administrators in France viewed co-operation as a wholly irritating task. Geographically removed from the colonies, Parisian courtiers viewed indigenous peoples as 'sauvages', often criticising New French officials for even interacting with nations.

As the fur trade became the dominant economy in the New World, French voyageurs, trappers and hunters often married or formed relationships with Indigenous women. This allowed the French to develop relations with their wives' Indigenous nations, which in turn provided protection and access to their hunting and trapping grounds.

One specific Indigenous group borne of these relationships are the Métis people, who are descendants of marriages between French men and Indigenous women. Their name originates from an old French term for “person of mixed parentage.” At the beginning of the fur trade, these relationships were encouraged by the French as a way to encourage the First Nations to adopt French culture and solidify alliances, but as the Métis began to emerge as an independent culture around the 1700s, it began to be discouraged by the French. Many Métis families moved to western Canada in response to this, as well as for other reasons, such as fur trading opportunities. One major settlement at this time was in the Red River Valley, strategically placed in a significant area for the fur trade. This was the origin of the modern Métis nation, which was legally recognized by modern Canada as a protected Indigenous group in the Constitution Act, 1982. Its prior legal history has its roots in acts such as the Manitoba Act, 1870, which began to recognize the Métis nation as a separate group with various rights and protections, but was not supported by the vast majority of Métis as it removed many from land that was rightfully theirs.

The fur trade benefited Indigenous people as well. They traded furs for metal tools and other European-made items that made their lives easier. Tools such as knives, pots and kettles, nets, firearms and hatchets improved the general welfare of indigenous peoples. At the same time, while everyday life became easier, some traditional ways of doing things were abandoned or altered, and while Indigenous people embraced many of these implements and tools, they also were exposed to less vital trade goods, such as alcohol and sugar, sometimes with deleterious effects. The Haudenosaunee, like most tribes, began to rely on the importation of European goods, like firearms, which contributed significantly to a decrease in the beaver population of the Hudson Valley. This decline resulted in the fur trade moving further north, along the St. Lawrence River.

=== Formal entry of England in New France area fur trade ===
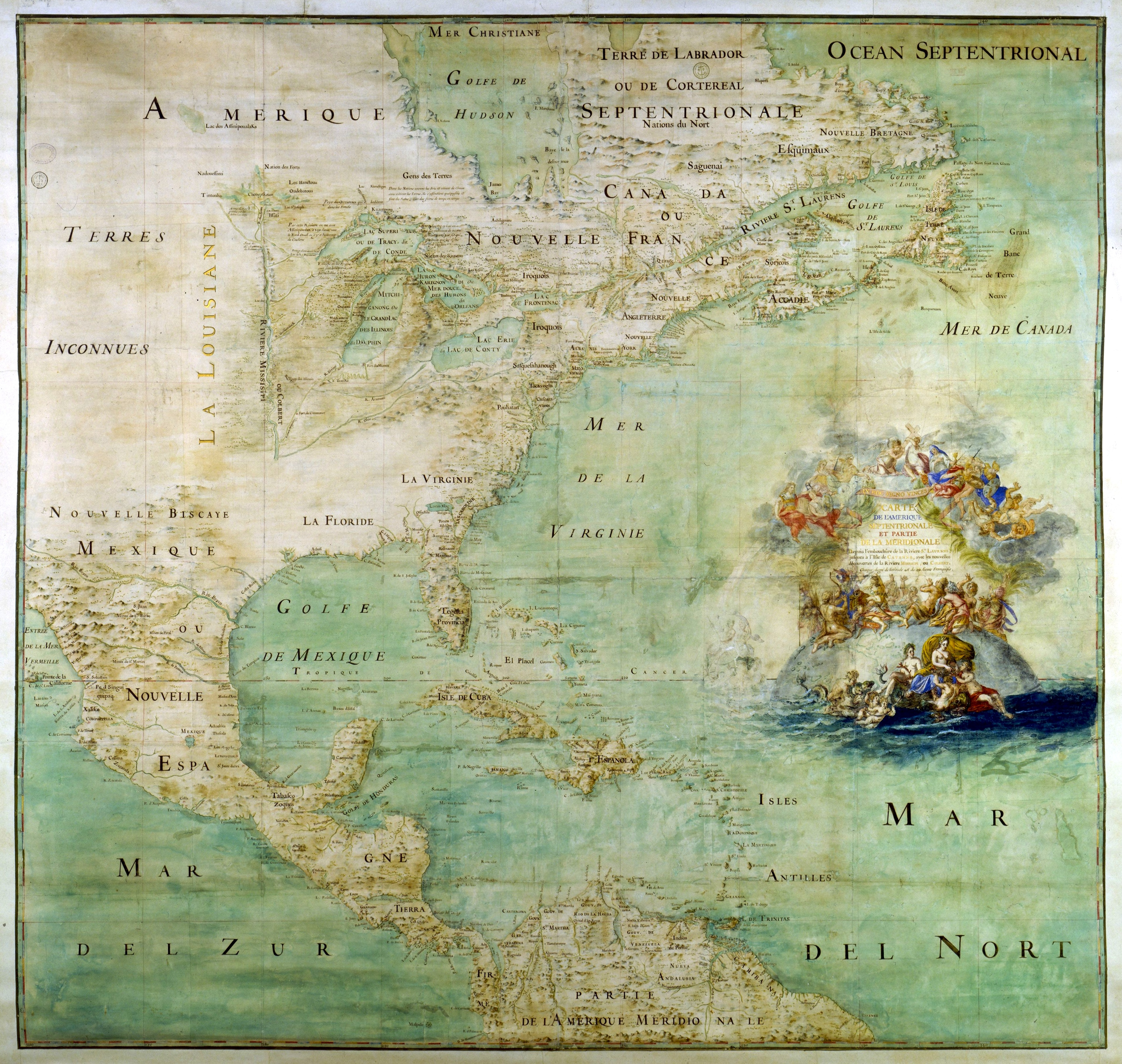
1681 French map of the New World above the equator: New France and the Great Lakes in the north, with a dark line as the Mississippi River to the west in the Illinois Country and the mouth of the river (and future New Orleans) then terra incognita

Since Henry Hudson had claimed Hudson Bay, and the surrounding lands for England in 1611, English colonists had begun expanding their boundaries across what is now the Canadian north beyond the French-held territory of New France. In 1670, King Charles II of England issued a charter to Prince Rupert and "the Company of Adventurers of England trading into Hudson Bay" for an English monopoly in harvesting furs in Rupert's Land, a portion of the land draining into Hudson Bay. This is the start of the Hudson's Bay Company, ironically aided by French coureurs des bois, Pierre-Esprit Radisson and Médard des Groseilliers, frustrated with French license rules. Now both France and England were formally in the Canadian fur trade.

=== The economy of La Louisiane ===
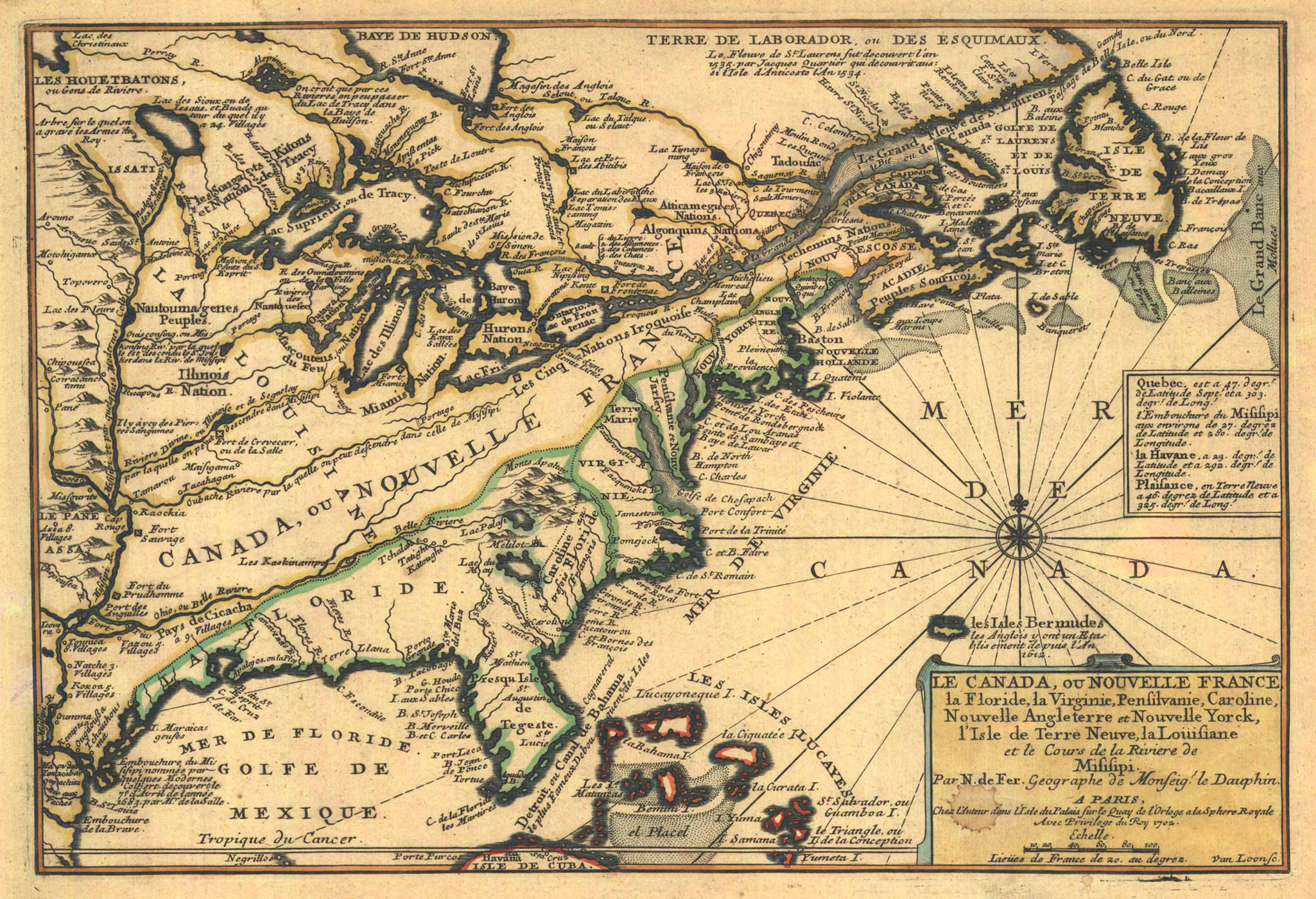
Map of Canada (New France) in 1703, showing full length of Mississippi River

The major commercial importance of the Louisiana Purchase territory was the Mississippi River. New Orleans, the largest and most important city in the territory, was the most commercial city in the United States until the Civil War, with most jobs there being related to trade and shipping; there was little manufacturing. The first commercial shipment to come down the Mississippi River was of deer and bear hides in 1705. The area, always loosely defined in those early times of European claims and settlements, extended as far east as the city that is now Mobile, Alabama, begun by French settlers in 1702.

The French (later Spanish) Louisiana Territory was owned by France for a number of years before the money-losing territory was transferred to French banker Antoine Crozat in 1713 for 15 years. After losing four times his investment, Crozat gave up his charter in 1717. Control of Louisiana and its 700 inhabitants was given to the Company of the Indies in 1719. The company conducted a major settlement program by recruiting European settlers to locate in the territory. Unemployed persons, convicts and prostitutes were also sent to the Louisiana Territory. After the bankruptcy of the company in 1720, control was returned to the king.

Louis XV saw little value in Louisiana, and to compensate Spain for its losses in the Seven Years' War, he transferred Louisiana to his cousin Charles III in 1762. Louisiana remained under the control of Spain until it was demanded to be turned over to France by Napoleon. Although Louisiana was property of France by the Third Treaty of San Ildefonso in 1800, Louisiana continued to be administered by Spain until the Louisiana Purchase in 1803. Following the American acquisition of the territory, its population tripled between 1803 and Louisiana statehood in 1812.

== Religion ==
Before the arrival of European colonists and explorers, First Nations followed a wide array of mostly animistic religions. As of 1607, official support for the first settlement at Port Royal was conditional based on efforts to convert the local First Nations people to Christianity. The French who later settled along the shores of the Saint Lawrence River, specifically Catholics, including a number of Jesuits dedicated to converting the indigenous population; an effort that eventually proved successful.

Starting from 1627 in Quebec and 1659 in Acadia, all other forms of Christianity other than Roman Catholicism were forbidden to be worshipped or taught in New France and only French-born Roman Catholics were allowed to immigrate. This put an end to religious tolerance in the colony, notwithstanding the fact that both Port Royal and Quebec City were both founded by protestant Huguenot Pierre Dugua. After 1610, Dugua was banished from the French court due to his protestant faith and could only be represented through Champlain.

As a result of official policy, the Catholic Church became the dominant force in New France. In 1642, they sponsored a group of settlers, led by Paul Chomedey de Maisonneuve, who founded Ville-Marie, precursor to present-day Montreal, farther up the St. Lawrence. Throughout the 1640s, Jesuit missionaries penetrated the Great Lakes region and converted many of the Wendat. The missionaries came into conflict with the Haudenosaunee, who frequently attacked Montreal.

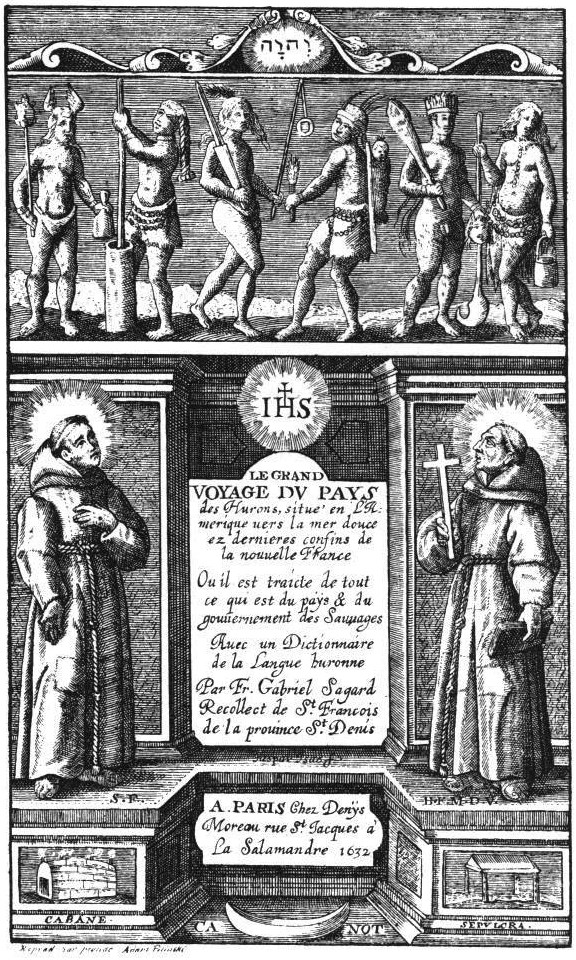
Le Grand Voyage du Pays des Hurons, Gabriel Sagard, 1632

The presence of Jesuit missionaries in Wendat society was nonnegotiable. The Wendat relied on French goods to facilitate life and warfare. Because the French would refuse trade to all indigenous societies that denied relations with missionaries, the Wendat had more of a propensity towards Christian conversion. The Wendat heavily relied on European goods to perform burial ceremonies known as The Huron Feast of the Dead. Trading with the French allowed for larger amounts of decorative goods to be buried during ceremonies as opposed to only a bare minimum. With the growing epidemics and high number of deaths, the Wendat could not afford to lose relations with the French, fearing to anger their ancestors.

Jesuit missionaries explored the Mississippi River, including the Illinois Country. Father Jacques Marquette and explorer Louis Jolliet traveled in a small party, starting from Green Bay down the Wisconsin River to the Mississippi River, communicating with the tribes they met en route. Although Spanish trade goods had reached most of the indigenous peoples, these were the first Frenchmen to connect in the area named for the Illinois, including the Kaskaskia. They kept detailed records of what they saw and the people they met, sketching what they could, and mapped the Mississippi River in 1673. Their travels were described as first contacts with the indigenous peoples, though evidence of contact with Spanish from the south was clear.

Subsequent to the arrival of French children in Quebec in 1634, measles was also brought along with them, which quickly spread among the indigenous peoples. Jesuit priest Jean de Brébeuf described the symptoms as being severe. Brebeuf stated that the fearlessness of the indigenous peoples towards death upon this disease made them perfect candidates for conversion to Christianity. The indigenous peoples believed that if they did not convert to Christianity, they would be exposed to the evil magic of the priests that caused the illness.

Jesuit missionaries were troubled by the absence of patriarchy in indigenous communities. Indigenous women were highly regarded within their societies and participated in political and military decisions. Jesuits attempted to eliminate the matriarchy and shift the powers of men and women to accommodate those of European societies. "In France, women are to be obedient to their masters, their husbands." Jesuits would attempt to justify this to the indigenous women in hopes to enlighten them on proper European behavior. In response, Indigenous women grew worrisome of the presence of these missionaries fearing they would lose power and freedom within their communities. By 1649, both the Jesuit mission and the Wendat society were almost destroyed by Haudenosaunee invasions (see Canadian Martyrs). In 1653, a peace invitation was extended by the Onondaga Nation, one of the five nations of the Haudenosaunee Confederacy, to New France, and an expedition of Jesuits, led by Simon Le Moyne, established Sainte Marie de Ganentaa in 1656. The Jesuits were forced to abandon the mission by 1658, as hostilities with the Haudenosaunee resumed.

The second article of the charter of the Compagnie des Cent-Associés stated that New France could only be Catholic. This resulted in Huguenots facing legal restrictions to enter the colony when Cardinal Richelieu transferred the control of the colony to Compagnie des Cent-Associés in 1627. Protestantism was then outlawed in France and all its overseas possessions by the Edict of Fontainebleau in 1685. In spite of that, approximately 15,000 Protestants settled in New France by using socioeconomic pretexts while at the same time concealing their religious background.

The Huguenots (a name used to designate French-speaking Calvinist Protestants) were a significantly mercantile group, originating from the coastal cities of north-western France, and had a significant impact on the early development of New France, especially in the regions of Quebec and Acadia, where many people still hold Huguenot surnames to this day. Huguenots were famous for their large and interconnected trading and communication network that spanned throughout France, and most of her colonies. This network was also known for trading with the Dutch Republic, and the Kingdom of England; two of France's most important rivals, that also happened to be Protestant nations.

Initially, King Henry IV recognised Protestants as a significant minority within France, and allowed them a certain degree of freedom. After several years of various skirmishes within metropolitan France, the Huguenots were deemed to not be "faithful servants of the king", and their mercantile powers stripped, their trading network disbanded, and widespread governmental persecutory policies were enacted both within mainland France and New France. In 1661, Louis XIV was able to enact self-rule as his regency ended, and he instituted a variety of anti-Protestant laws throughout his realm. Under these new rules, Protestant children were forcibly converted to Catholicism, implemented direct governmental jurisdiction over what were formerly Huguenot-controlled trade routes, and labelled the Protestant communities throughout New France (specifically Quebec and Acadia) as significant threats to the colonies, as they might sympathise with English Protestants competing in the same areas and trades. Eventually, Protestants were banned from settling in Nouvelle France, and the existing ones were only allowed to "summer" in the colonies, not "winter" there.

=== Jews ===
Jews were barred from New France throughout the French regime, since immigration was restricted to Catholics. Article II of the act establishing the Company of One Hundred Associates, signed by Richelieu on 29 April 1627, forbade the associates to bring any foreigner to the colony and required that it be peopled with "natural-born French Catholics". A non-Catholic immigrant could expect either conversion or deportation. In Louisiana, the first article of the Code noir of March 1724, applying an edict of Louis XIII of 23 April 1615, ordered officials to expel any Jews who had settled there, "as declared enemies of the Christian name", within three months, on pain of confiscation of person and property.

The first Jewish person known to have reached the colony was Esther Brandeau, born around 1718, probably at Saint-Esprit near Bayonne, who arrived at Quebec in September 1738 disguised as a boy under the name Jacques La Fargue. Once her identity was discovered, Intendant Gilles Hocquart had her arrested and taken to the Hôpital Général. Clergy tried without success to convert her to Catholicism, and in the autumn of 1739 she was sent back to France at the state's expense on the orders of Louis XV. The Dictionary of Canadian Biography notes that Jews who had apparently converted to Christianity probably also came to New France and practised their religion in private.

Exclusion from residence did not prevent Jewish merchants in France from trading with the colony. Under a contract of 10 July 1748, renewed in 1755, the Bordeaux firm of David Gradis et Fils, led by Abraham Gradis, formed a transatlantic trading company with Intendant François Bigot and the controller of the Marine, Jacques-Michel Bréard; the partners shared the profits of at least one annual shipment of about 300 tons of goods from Bordeaux to Quebec. The trade ended with the loss of Canada.

Jews began to settle in the former French colony only after the British conquest; by 1768 those in Montreal had founded Shearith Israel, Canada's first synagogue.

== Health ==
Public health in New France was generally inadequate, despite the presence of a relatively good medical infrastructure. An apothecary, Louis Hébert In 1617 was engaged by Samuel de Champlain to serve the new colony as physician, surgeon and dispenser of medicines and herbs. After 1685 Michel Sarrazin and François Gaultier served as the King's physician of the colony. The colony opened small hospitals known as "Hôtel-Dieu" in Montréal, Quebec City and Trois-Rivières. These institutions were managed by Catholic Church congregations included surgeons, doctors, apothecaries and healers. They provided care to settlers, soldiers, sailors, and occasionally Native populations. The Hôtel-Dieu in Quebec City cared for an average of 589 people per year from 1689, to 1759. The Congregations organized and financed healthcare services. Their care aimed at both spiritual and physical healing.

The colony faced high mortality rates due to infectious diseases. Epidemics imported from France were deadly. In 1687, measles and typhoid fever killed about 500 people. In 1702-1703, about 8% of the population died of smallpox. Major epidemics hit in 1715, 1731 and 1785. Medical knowledge was limited, and treatments were often based on old French traditions. The towns were unsanitary, with unpaved streets, free-roaming animals, and lack of proper waste disposal. This led to frequent outbreaks of infectious diseases. Outside the towns the low population density mitigated the spread of diseases and conditions were better than France itself. The "Conseil supérieur" introduced laws to improve urban sanitation, such as requiring latrines and proper waste disposal. The British after 1759 made few changes in public health matters. They did bring in a few British military surgeons. Most of the French medical personnel remained and they followed the old routines, but no longer had replacements from Paris.

== Judiciary of New France ==
=== Early history in New France (pre-1663) ===
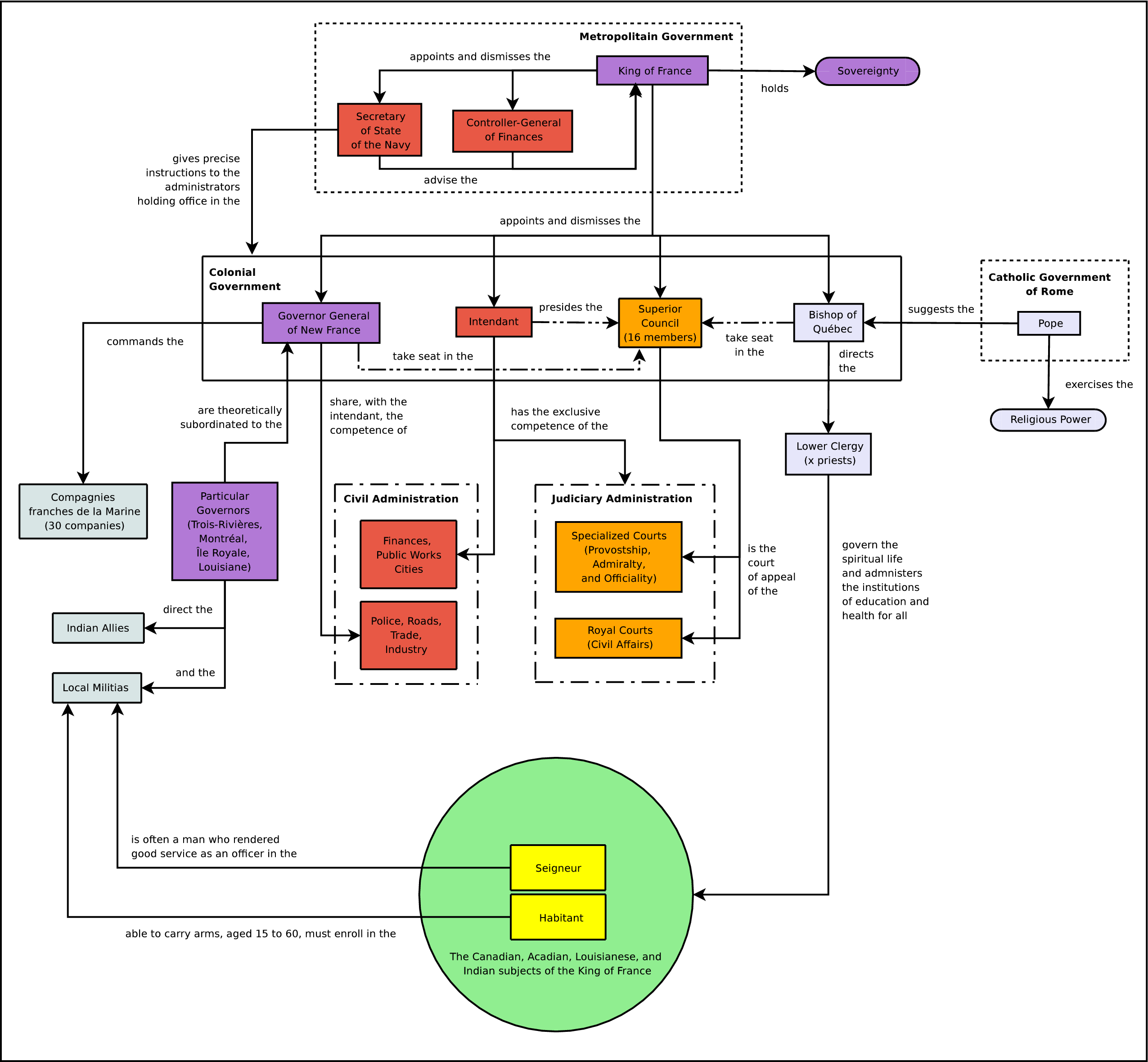
A chart showing the political organization of New France, c. 1759

In the early stage of French settlement, legal matters fell within the Governor of New France's purview. Under this arrangement, legal disputes were settled in an incoherent fashion due to the Governor's arbitrariness in issuing verdicts.

Since 1640, a Seneschal (sénéchal), a Judge (juge d'épée, which literally means 'sword-bearing judge'), and a jurisdiction in Trois-Rivières were created. However, the Seneschal was under the oversight by the Governor, hence the Governor still had rather extensive control over legal matters in New France. In 1651, the Company of New France made the Great Seneschal (Grand Sénéchal) the chief justice. However, the Island of Montreal had its special Governor at that time, who also administered justice on the Island, and had not handed over justice to the Grand Seneschal until 1652.

In practice, though, the Great Seneschal was awarded as an honorary title to the son of Jean de Lauson (also named Jean de Lauson), then Governor of New France; judicial functions were in fact carried out by the Seneschal's deputies. These deputies included such officials as the civil and criminal lieutenant general (lieutenant général civil et criminel), the special lieutenant (lieutenant particulier, acting as assistant royal judge), and the lieutenant fiscal (lieutenant fiscal, acting as tax magistrate).

The Civil and Criminal Lieutenant General sat as judge in trials at first instance, whereas appeals would be adjudicated by the Governor, who held the sovereign right to settle final appeals on behalf of the French king. The Great Seneschal also had a magistrate in Trois-Rivières, as well as a bailiff formed by the Society of Priests of Saint Sulpice on the Island of Montreal.

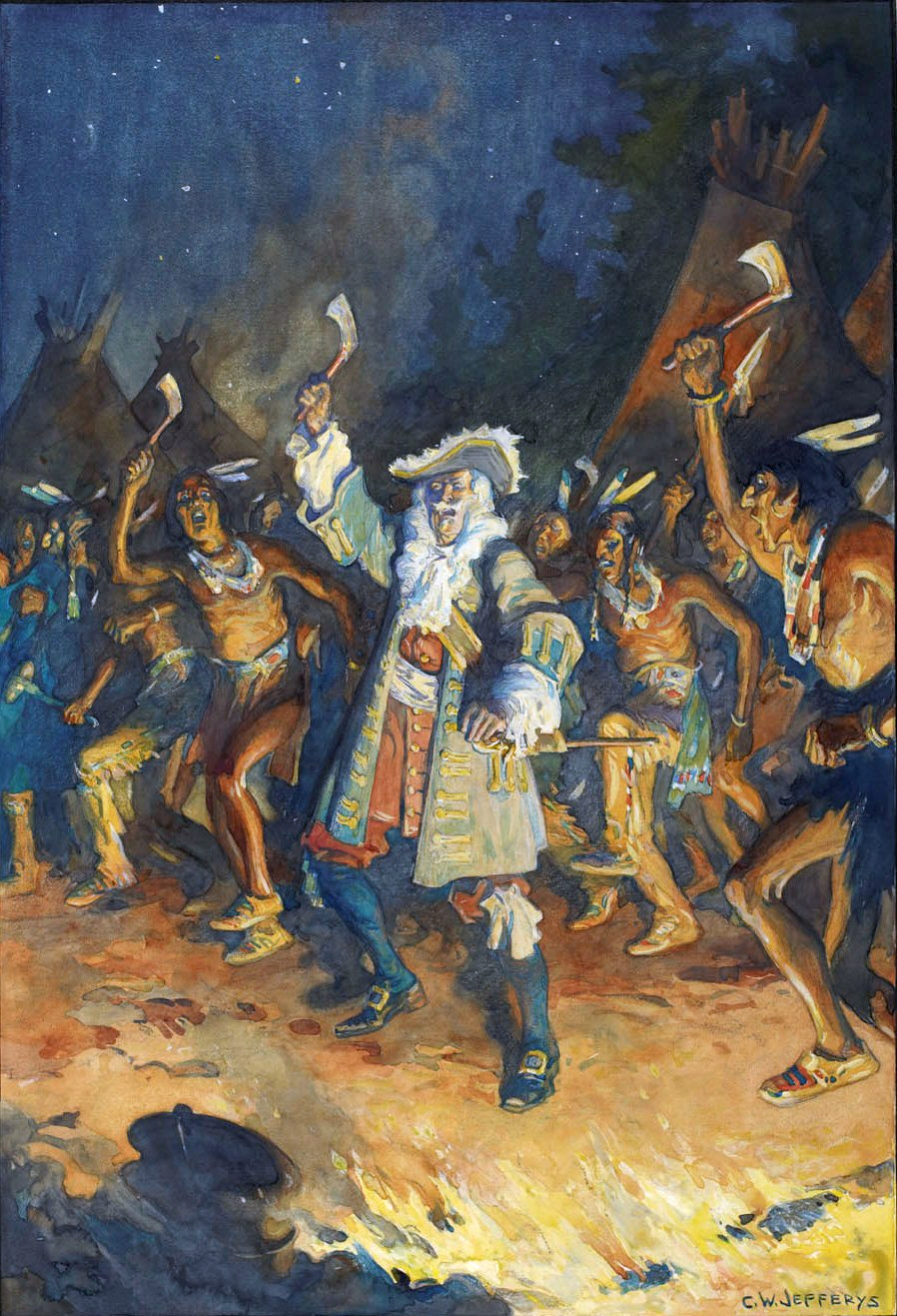
Governor Frontenac performing a tribal dance with indigenous allies

Apart from judicial responsibilities, the Great Seneschal was also in charge of convening local nobility in New France, as well as issuing declarations of war if necessary. However, such alternative role of the Great Seneschal was much weakened soon after by having the rights to declare war and to administer finances stripped off from the office because the French crown feared that colonial officers held too much authority.

=== Legal reforms (1663) ===
==== Royal judges and the Sovereign Council ====
On 13 October 1663, the royal court replaced the Seneschal Office (sénéchaussée). Canada was divided into three districts: the district of Quebec City, the district of Trois-Rivières, and the district of Montreal. Each district had its own separate jurisdiction with a judge appointed by the Crown, known as the civil and criminal lieutenants general. They were responsible for all legal matters, civil and criminal, in each of the districts.

In addition to the royal judges, there were other judicial officers in each district. The clerk of court (registrar) was responsible for transcribing all court proceedings as well as other documents relevant to each of the cases. The king's attorney (procureur du roi) was responsible for inquiring into the facts and preparing the case against the accused. In the districts of Quebec City and Montreal, the royal judges had special lieutenants to substitute them whenever they were absent or sick. Feudal courts heard minor cases.

The reform also brought the Sovereign Council of New France (Conseil souverain) into existence, which was later renamed the Superior Council (Conseil supérieur). The Sovereign Council effectively acted as the functional equivalent of a Council of State (Conseil d'État) for New France, having the authority to hand down verdicts on final appeal. Initially, the Council convened once every week, and the quorum of the Sovereign Council was seven for criminal matters, or five for civil cases. The council's practices evolved over time. At the Sovereign Council there was a king's attorney-general (procureur général du roi) in charge of the similar tasks as the district king's attorneys. He was also responsible for supervising the king's attorneys' daily operations as well as execution of royal edicts and regulations passed by the council in their respective districts.

==== The Custom of Paris ====
In 1664, the Custom of Paris (coutume de Paris) was formally set as the main source of law for civil law in France's overseas empire. All royal judges and king's attorneys in New France had to be thoroughly familiar with this compilation of rules. The Custom governed various civil aspects of the daily life in New France, including property, marriage, inheritance, and so on.

===== Montreal Island: transition from feudal justice to royal justice =====
The Island of Montreal was a special case because its judiciary had been previously held by the Society of St-Sulpice. In 1663, Governor-General of New France Augustin de Saffray de Mésy originally considered appointing Paul de Chomedey, Sieur de Maisonneuve the Governor of the Island of Montreal and consolidating a royal jurisdiction on the island, but the plan garnered the St-Sulpicians' disapproval, who held the Island as its own fiefdom and effectively acted as the island's governor. In other words, the Sovereign Council had not been able to seize effective control over the legal matters of the Island; instead, the St-Sulpicians administered justice on the island.

It was not until 16 September 1666, that the St-Sulpicians finally handed over the justice of the Island of Montreal to the Intendant of New France. In 1693, the French king commanded the replacement of the ecclesiastical courts in Montreal with a royal court composed of one royal judge, with appeals going to the Sovereign Council. The introduction of a royal court on the Montreal Island also resulted in the abolition of the feudal court in the fief of Trois-Rivières (then held by the Jesuits).

===== Quebec: founding of the Provostry of Quebec =====
In the Quebec City district, the lower court (tribunal antérieur) was established in 1664 and had jurisdiction to try cases at first instance, but then it was abolished in 1674. The Sovereign Council appointed trial judges (juges inférieurs) to adjudicate cases at first instance until the Provostry of Quebec (prévôté de Québec) was created in May 1677.

The Provostry of Quebec was located in the Hall of Justice (palais de justice) in Quebec City and had only one royal judge, also known as the civil and criminal lieutenant general of Quebec City, who heard both civil and criminal cases, as well as district police. Additionally, a court clerk and a king's attorney were appointed to the court; if either of these two officers could not attend the trials due to illness or other untenable circumstances, the Intendant would appoint a temporary substitute.

=== Criminal justice ===
In the early stages of French colonization, the execution of criminal justice in New France was rather arbitrary. The Governor of New France served as the judge to the colonists as well as soldiers. He would announce his verdict at the presence of the chiefs of the Company of One Hundred Associates and that would be final.

After the Sovereign Council was established in Quebec in 1663, the Council carried out criminal justice according to the general ordinances of France. In 1670, the Criminal Ordinance was enacted in New France by order of the French king as a codification of the previous criminal laws passed by the Sovereign Council.

=== Special courts ===
==== Ecclesiastical court ====
The ecclesiastical court (tribunal ecclésiastique, or Officialité) was a special court for hearing first instance trials on both religious and secular affairs involving members of the Church. It first appeared in around 1660 but was not officially recognized by state authorities for it was not administered by a bishop, until 1684. Appeals from this court lay with the Sovereign Council.

==== Admiralty court ====
The court of admiralty was created on 12 January 1717 and was the last judicial body set up in Canada during the French colonial period. The court had a judge (also known as the lieutenant-general of the court) appointed by the French admiralty, a king's attorney, a clerk of court, and one or two bailiffs (huissiers). The admiralty court was located in Quebec City and had jurisdiction over all of New France except Louisiana and Louisbourg. The court heard first instance trials on maritime affairs, including commerce and seamen's conduct. During wartime, it also commanded maritime police. Before 1717, the Quebec Provostry performed the duties of the admiralty court.

=== Acadia ===
Unlike Canada, Acadia's judicial system was somewhat under-developed during the New France period. Prior to 1670, Acadia was in a state of being contested between various European colonists. None of the European countries—France, England, the Netherlands—were able to put in place a stable jurisdiction there.

In 1670, France regained control of Acadia and appointed Mathieu de Goutin as the Civil and Criminal Lieutenant (lieutenant civil et criminel) of Acadia. Simultaneously, the Governor of Acadia was set up and his job was primarily the defense of Acadia from English attacks. The Civil and Criminal Lieutenant was essentially supervised by the Governor, who held superior judicial authority over the Lieutenant, but for most of the time would let the Lieutenant mediate and decide legal affairs.

Due to the situation in Acadia as a small settlement of around 399 settlers in 1670–71, vulnerable to foreign invasion, courts were minimal, consisting of only a Civil and Criminal Lieutenant and a king's attorney. There was not an official court in Acadia, although the king's attorney of Acadia performed very similar duties as his counterpart in New France. Yet since Acadia never actually had a court, there was no clerk of court; instead, trials were recorded by a local notary. It is difficult to trace the judicial history of French Acadia as the relevant archives were destroyed in a fire in 1708.

== Military conflicts ==
The presence of settlers, of businesses from several European countries harvesting furs, along with the interests of the indigenous people in this new competition for North American resources set the scene for significant military conflicts among all parties in New France beginning in 1642, and ending with the Seven Years' War, 1756–1763.

=== Haudenosaunee attacks against Montreal ===
Engraving depicting Adam Dollard with a keg of gunpowder above his head, during the Battle of Long Sault

Ville-Marie was a noteworthy site for it was the center of defence against the Haudenosaunee, the point of departure for all western and northern journeys, and the meeting point to which the trading Indians brought their annual furs. This placed Ville-Marie, later known as Montreal, at the forefront against the Haudenosaunee, which resulted in its trade being easily and frequently interrupted. The Haudenosaunee were in alliance with the Dutch and English, which allowed them to interrupt the French fur trade and send the furs down the Hudson River to the Dutch and English traders.

This also put the Haudenosaunee at warfare against the Wendats, the Algonquians, and any other tribes that were in alliance with the French. If the Haudenosaunee could destroy New France and its Indian allies, they would be able to trade freely and profitably with the Dutch and English on the Hudson River. The Haudenosaunee formally attacked the settlement at today's Quebec City in its foundation year of 1642, and in almost every subsequent year thereafter. A militant theocracy maintained Montreal. In 1653 and 1654, reinforcements arrived at Montreal, which allowed the Haudenosaunee to be halted. In that year the Haudenosaunee made peace with the French.

Adam Dollard des Ormeaux, a colonist and soldier of New France, was a notable figure regarding the Haudenosaunee attacks against Montreal. The Haudenosaunee soon resumed their assaults against Montreal, and the few settlers of Montreal fell almost completely to hostile Haudenosaunee forces. The Haudenosaunee did not use typical raiding tactics of moving swiftly and silently. Instead, they captured individuals and brought them back to their own territory. Women and children were made a part of the village, and men encountered slow torturous deaths. In the 1660s, warfare changed, and France began to counterattack. Professional French soldiers had arrived in the New World for the first time, and Alexandre de Prouville led them to invade Haudenosaunee territory. In the spring of 1660, Adam Dollard des Ormeaux led a small militia consisting of 16 men from Montreal against a much larger Haudenosaunee force at the Battle of Long Sault on the Ottawa River. They succeeded in turning back the Haudenosaunee invasion and are responsible for saving Montreal from destruction. They were able to take Chief Canaqueese as a prisoner, and in September 1660, the French returned and burned Haudenosaunee homes and crops. Later that Winter, many Haudenosaunee died due to starvation, and the Haudenosaunee finally agreed to peace which lasted roughly twenty years. The encounter between Ormeaux and the Haudenosaunee is of significance because it dissuaded the Haudenosaunee from further attacks against Montreal.

=== King William's War ===
Map of North America in 1702 showing forts, towns and (in solid colors) areas occupied by European settlements

In 1688, King William's War began and the English and Haudenosaunee launched a major assault on New France, after many years of small skirmishes throughout the English and French territories. New France and the Wabanaki Confederacy were able to thwart New England expansion into Acadia, whose border New France defined as the Kennebec River in southern Maine. King William's War ended in 1697, but a second war (Queen Anne's War) broke out in 1702. Quebec survived the English invasions of both these wars, and during the wars France seized many of the English Hudson's Bay Company fur trading centres on Hudson Bay including York Factory, which the French renamed Fort Bourbon.

=== Queen Anne's War ===
While Acadia defeated an English invasion attempt during King William's War, the colony was occupied by the British during Queen Anne's War. The final Conquest of Acadia happened in 1710. In 1713, peace came to New France with the Treaty of Utrecht. Although the treaty turned Hudson Bay, Newfoundland and part of Acadia (peninsular Nova Scotia) over to Great Britain, France remained in control of Île Royale (Cape Breton Island) (which also administered Île Saint-Jean (Prince Edward Island)). The northern part of Acadia, what is today New Brunswick and Maine, remained contested territory. Construction of Fortress Louisbourg on Île Royale, a French military stronghold intended to protect the approaches to the St. Lawrence River settlements, began in 1719.

=== Father Rale's War ===
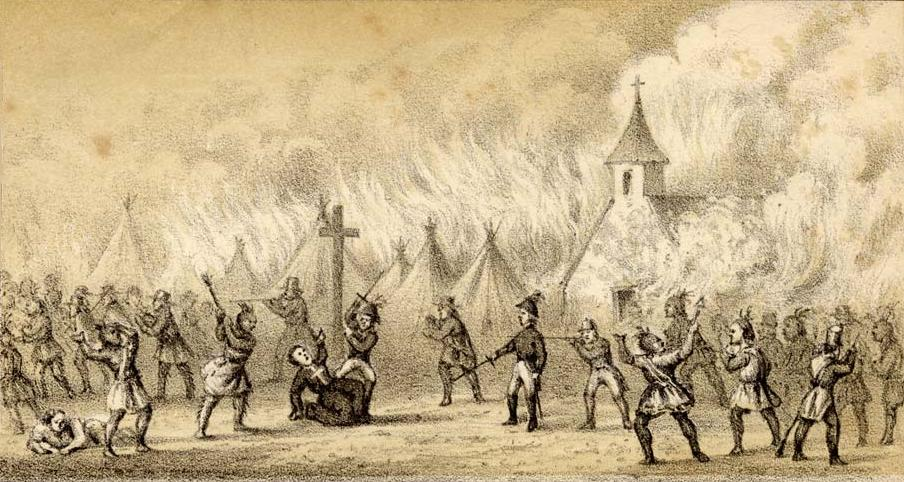
An 1850s depiction of the death of the French Jesuit priest Sébastien Rale during Father Rale's War

In Acadia, however, war continued. Father Rale's War (1722–1725) was a series of battles between New England and the Wabanaki Confederacy, who were allied with New France. New France and the Wabanaki Confederacy defended against the expansion of New England settlements into Acadia, whose border New France defined as the Kennebec River in southern Maine. After the New England Conquest of Acadia in 1710, mainland Nova Scotia was under the control of New England, but both present-day New Brunswick and virtually all of present-day Maine remained contested territory between New England and New France. To secure New France's claim to the region, it established Catholic missions among the three largest indigenous villages in the region: one on the Kennebec River (Norridgewock); one further north on the Penobscot River (Penobscot) and one on the Saint John River (Medoctec).

The war began on two fronts: when New England pushed its way through Maine and when New England established itself at Canso, Nova Scotia. As a result of the war, Maine fell to the New Englanders with the defeat of Father Sébastien Rale at Norridgewock and the subsequent retreat of the indigenous peoples from the Kennebec and Penobscot rivers to St. Francis and Becancour, Quebec. (Note: While New Englanders safely settled the land, not until the treaty of 1752 did Massachusetts officially lay claim to the entire Penobscot watershed, and in 1759, the Pownall Expedition, led by Governor Thomas Pownall, established Fort Pownall on Cape Jellison in what is now Stockton Springs.)

=== King George's War ===
Peace lasted in Canada until 1744, when news of the outbreak of the War of the Austrian Succession (King George's War in North America) reached Fort Louisbourg. The French forces went on the attack first in a failed attempt to capture Annapolis Royal, the capital of British Nova Scotia. In 1745, William Shirley, governor of Massachusetts, led a counterattack on Louisbourg. Both France and New France were unable to relieve the siege, and Louisbourg fell to the British. With the famed Duc d'Anville Expedition, France attempted to retake Acadia and the fortress in 1746 but failed. The fortress was returned to France under the Treaty of Aix-la-Chapelle, but the peace treaty, which restored all colonial borders to their pre-war status, did little to end the lingering enmity between France, Britain, and their respective colonies, nor did it resolve any territorial disputes.

=== Father Le Loutre's War ===
Within Acadia and Nova Scotia, Father Le Loutre's War (1749–1755) began with the British founding of Halifax. During Father Le Loutre's War, New France established three forts along the border of present-day New Brunswick to protect it from a New England attack from Nova Scotia. The war continued until British victory at Fort Beausejour, which dislodged Father Le Loutre from the region, thereby ending his alliance with the Maliseet, Acadians and Mi'kmaq.

=== French and Indian War ===
Map of the French and Indian War.

Fort Duquesne, located at the confluence of the Allegheny and Monongahela Rivers at the site of present-day Pittsburgh, Pennsylvania, guarded the most important strategic location in the west at the time of the Seven Years' War. It was built to ensure that the Ohio River valley remained under French control. A small colonial force from Virginia began a fort here, but a French force under Claude-Pierre Pécaudy de Contrecœur drove them off in April 1754. New France claimed this as part of their colony, and the French were anxious to keep the British from encroaching on it. The French built Fort Duquesne here to serve as a military stronghold and as a base for developing trade and strengthening military alliances with the indigenous peoples of the area.

In 1755, General Edward Braddock led an expedition against Fort Duquesne, and although they were numerically superior to the French militia and their Indian allies, Braddock's army was routed and Braddock was killed. Later that same year at the Battle of Lake George, the British General William Johnson with a force of 1700 American and Haudenosaunee troops defeated a French force of 2800 French and Canadians and 700 Native Americans led by Baron Dieskau (Military commander of New France).

The fight for control over Ohio Country led to the French and Indian War, which began as the North American phase of the Seven Years' War (which did not technically begin in Europe until 1756). The war began with the defeat of a Virginia militia contingent led by Colonel George Washington by the French troupes de la marine in the Ohio valley. As a result of that defeat, the British decided to prepare the conquest of Quebec City, the capital of New France. The British defeated France in Acadia in the Battle of Fort Beausejour (1755) and then Île Royale (Cape Breton Island) (which also administered Île Saint-Jean (Prince Edward Island) with the Siege of Louisbourg (1758).

Throughout the war, the British deported the Acadians to the Thirteen Colonies and Europe, which the Acadian militias resisted with assistance from Mi'kmaq and Malisteet forces. The Great Upheaval continued from 1755 to 1764. In 1756, a large force of French, Canadians, and their Native American allies led by the Marquis de Montcalm launched an attack against the key British post at Fort Oswego on Lake Ontario from Fort Frontenac and forced the garrison to surrender. The following year Montcalm with a huge force of 7,200 French and Canadian troops and 2,400 Native Americans laid siege to Fort William Henry on the southern shores of Lake George, and after three weeks of fighting the British commander Monroe surrendered. Montcalm gave him honorable terms to return to England and not to fight for 18 months. And yet, when the British force with civilians was three miles from the fort, the Native American allies massacred about 1,100 of the 1,500 strong force.

In 1758, the French suffered a defeat when the British captured the fortress city of Louisborg in July, while gaining a victory at Fort Carillon in July. The Battle of Carillon was fought at the fortress of the same name, which is located on a strip of land between Lake Champlain and Lake George, and which was defended by 3,400 French regular troops and marines, with minimal support from militia and indigenous peoples. The battle was the largest seen in North America up to that time, as General James Abercrombie assembled a force of 16,200 British, American, and Haudenosaunee troops. A spirited French defense led the British to withdraw after a fierce battle on the 8th of July, 1758. During the battle, the British suffered 2,200 casualties and lost several artillery pieces, while the French received roughly 104 killed and 273 wounded.

While the British Conquest of Acadia happened in 1710, the French continued to remain a significant force in the region with Fort Beausejour and Fortress Louisbourg. The dominant population in the region remained Acadian, that is to say, not British. In 1755, the British were successful in the Battle of Beausejour and immediately after began the expulsion of the Acadians.

In the meantime the French continued to explore westwards and expand their trade alliances with indigenous peoples. Fort de la Corne was built in 1753, by Louis de la Corne, Chevalier de la Corne just east of the Saskatchewan River Forks in what is today the Canadian province of Saskatchewan. This was the furthest westward outpost of the French Empire in North America to be established before its fall.

== Treaties of cession ==
In 1758, British forces again captured Louisbourg, allowing them to blockade the entrance to the St. Lawrence River. This proved decisive in the war. In 1759, the British besieged Quebec by sea, and an army under General James Wolfe defeated the French under General Louis-Joseph de Montcalm at the Battle of the Plains of Abraham in September. The garrison in Quebec surrendered on 18 September, and by the next year New France had been conquered by the British after the attack on Montreal, which had refused to acknowledge the fall of Canada. The last French governor-general of New France, Pierre François de Rigaud, Marquis de Vaudreuil-Cavagnal, surrendered to British Major General Jeffery Amherst on 8 September 1760. France formally ceded Canada to the British in the Treaty of Paris, signed 10 February 1763.

== Aftermath ==
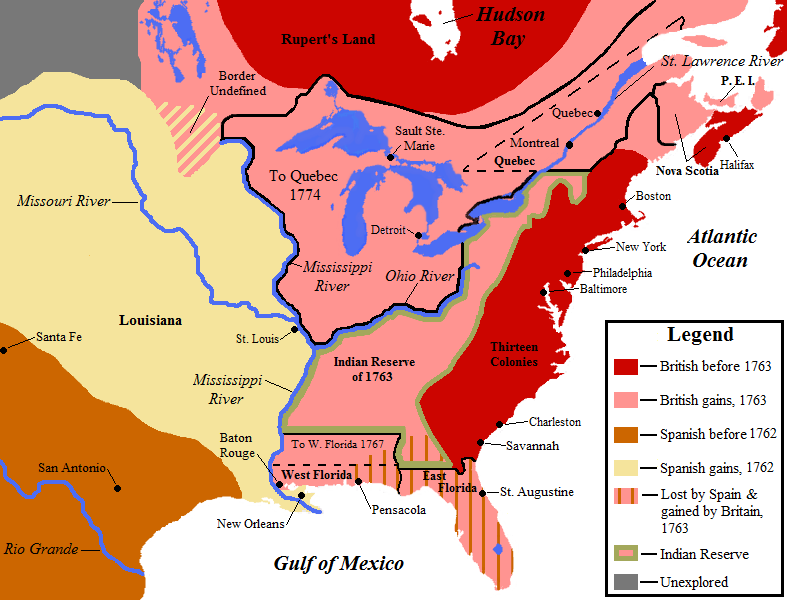
Map showing British territorial gains following the Treaty of Paris in pink, and Spanish territorial gains after the Treaty of Fontainebleau in yellow

The expelled Acadians were initially dispersed across much of eastern North America (including the Thirteen Colonies) and some were sent to France. Many eventually settled in Quebec or Louisiana, while others returned to the regions of New Brunswick and Nova Scotia. Chéticamp, Nova Scotia, and the Magdalen Islands have significant communities. In Louisiana their descendants became known as the Cajuns, a corruption of the French Acadiens.

By the mid-1700s, the French settlers were well established with a population around 70,000, mainly due to natural increase. The European population had grown slowly under French rule. The British Thirteen Colonies to the south along the Atlantic coast grew in population from natural increase and more new settlers from Europe. By 1760, almost 1.6 million people lived in the British colonies, a ratio of approximately twenty-three to one compared to New France. The population of the New England colonies alone in 1760 was nearly 450,000.

French culture and religion remained dominant in most of the former territory of New France until the arrival of British settlers led to the later creation of Upper Canada (today Ontario) and New Brunswick. The Louisiana Territory, under Spanish control since the end of the Seven Years' War, remained off-limits to settlement from the thirteen American colonies.

Twelve years after the British defeated the French, the American Revolutionary War broke out in the Thirteen Colonies. Many French Canadians would take part in the war, including Major Clément Gosselin and Admiral Louis-Philippe de Vaudreuil. After the British surrender at Yorktown in 1781, the Treaty of Versailles gave all former British claims in New France below the Great Lakes into the possession of the nascent United States. A Franco-Spanish alliance treaty returned Louisiana to France in 1801, but French leader Napoleon Bonaparte sold it to the United States in the Louisiana Purchase in 1803, ending French colonial efforts in North America.

The portions of the former New France that remained under British rule were administered as Upper Canada and Lower Canada, 1791–1841, and then those regions were merged as the Province of Canada during 1841–1867, when the passage of the British North America Act 1867 instituted home rule for most of British North America and established French-speaking Quebec (the former Lower Canada) as one of the original provinces of the Dominion of Canada. The former French colony of Acadia was first designated the Colony of Nova Scotia but shortly thereafter the Colony of New Brunswick, which then included Prince Edward Island, was split off from it.

In Canada, the legacy of New France can be seen in the enduring Francophone identity of its descendants, which has led to institutional bilingualism in Canada as a whole.

The French overseas collectivity of Saint Pierre and Miquelon (French: Collectivité territoriale de Saint-Pierre-et-Miquelon), consisting of a group of small islands 25 kilometres (16 mi; 13 nmi) off the coast of Newfoundland, were ceded to France by Britain in 1763 to assist with existing French fishing rights that France retained: the islands are not remnants of New France although the fishing rights were.

== Historiography ==
The Conquest (referring to the fall of New France to the British, and specifically the events of 1759–60) has always been a central and contested theme of Canadian memory. Some Anglophone historians portray the Conquest as a victory for "British military, political and economic superiority" and argue that it ultimately brought benefits to the French settlers. However, Cornelius Jaenen notes that French-Canadian historians remain strongly divided on the subject. One group sees it as a highly negative economic, political and ideological disaster that threatened a way of life with materialism and Protestantism. At the other pole are those historians who see the positive benefit of enabling the preservation of language, and religion and traditional customs under British rule. French-Canadian debates have escalated since the 1960s, as the conquest is seen as a pivotal moment in the history of Québec's nationalism. Francophone historian Jocelyn Létourneau suggested in 2009, that today, "1759 does not belong primarily to a past that we might wish to study and understand, but, rather, to a present and a future that we might wish to shape and control."

The enduring contestation of the legacy of the Conquest can be exemplified by an episode in 2009, when an attempt to commemorate the 250th anniversary of the battle of the Plains of Abraham was cancelled. The explanation for the cancellation was that it was over security concerns, but activist Sylvain Rocheleau stated, "[I think] they had to cancel the event because it was insulting a majority of Francophones. They had to cancel it because it was a bad idea.".

== See also ==
- French presence in the Ohio Valley
- List of French possessions and colonies
- List of North American cities founded in chronological order
- Timeline of New France history
