= Jean de Lauson (grand seneschal) =

Grand seneschal of New France (d. 22 June 1661)

Jean de Lauson (1620 to 1635–22 June 1661) was grand seneschal of New France from 1651 to 1661. He was the son of the governor of New France Jean de Lauson.

== Biography ==
Jean de Lauson Junior was born between 1620 to 1635 to Jean de Lauson and Marie Gaudar.

He was in Quebec City, New France in late August 1644, when he acted as godfather for Anne Bourdon. He again came to Quebec with his father on 13 October 1651, after resigning from the Navarre and Picardy regiments. When he arrived, his father gave him land grants in the Lauson seigneurie around Cap-Rouge.

As his father reformed the justice system in New France, he was named in 1651 grand seneschal of New France, meaning he was at the head of the justice system of New France. He had the power to sit on all courts and all the courts were under his jurisdiction, but in truth it was mostly an honorary title, with subordinates being responsible (or the governor in cases of appeals) for the execution of justice.

His main occupation was military matters, as his father was old and incapable of waging war, whereas junior had served in the military. He made a military inspection at Trois-Rivières in February 1652, and in August of the same year he took part in the city's defence against the Iroquois. His father left in 1656, and he retired to his estate of Beaumarchais, near Beauport.

During a period of intense guerilla activity from the Iroquois, Jean de Lauson went with six companions to search on 22 June 1661 for his brother-in-law Louis Couillard de Lespinay, who was late returning from a hunting expedition. He met 80 Iroquois, fought and died alongside his companions. His body was covered and his head was removed, having been carried off as a war trophy by the Iroquois. He was buried on the feast of Saint John the Baptist in Quebec City's church.

== Personal life and character ==
On 23 October 1651 he married Anne Després, who had come from France with him. Jean de Lauson had six children with her, with only two daughters surviving to adulthood (who would become Ursulines).

Jean de Lauson was known to be cheerful and friendly. He was respected for his authority. He was courageous.
