= Jean de Lauson =

Canadian politician

Jean de Lauzon
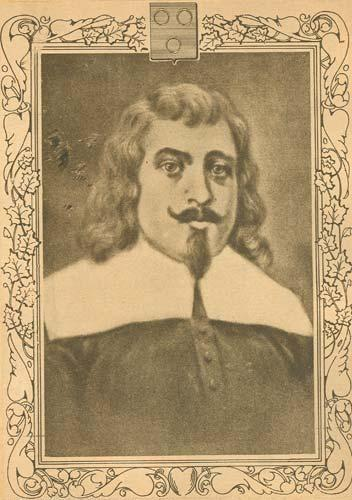
- Born: 2 January 1586; Paris
- Died: 16 February 1666 (aged 80); Paris
- Occupations: Lawyer, politician, businessman, colonial viceroy

Jean de Lauzon or de Lauson (French pronunciation: [ʒɑ̃ də lozɔ̃]; 2 January 1586 – 16 February 1666) was the governor of New France from 1651 to 1657, one of the most challenging times for the new colony. He also was born into being the lord of Lirec.

As a prominent lawyer in France, in 1613 Lauzon was appointed a counsellor in the Parliament. He served in several government positions, including president of the Grand Conseil, intendant of Provence, then of Guyenne, and of Dauphiné.

Lauzon had been developing interests in the colony of New France. He was a founding member and became the director of the Compagnie des Cent-Associés. Lauzon used his influence within the company to obtain land for himself and his sons in the colony. By 1640, the Lauzons had become the biggest landowners in the colony. Their properties included the Island of Montreal and Île d'Orléans.

Lauzon was appointed as governor in 1651. He moved with his three sons – including François, the eldest, who was a member of Parliament for Bordeaux, and Jean, whom he would name grand seneschal – to the colony. His wife had apparently earlier died in France. All three sons married into other founding families of the colony after having been set up with various lands and positions within the area. The establishment of Lauzon's family in the colony was probably intended to inspire confidence amongst the settlers and encourage agriculture in addition to the fur trade. He was the first governor to pursue this type of policy.

In 1653, Lauzon negotiated a peace treaty with the Mohawk, an Iroquois nation based in what is now New York. It ended their attacks on French settlers and reduced the threat to the colony for some years. Afterward, he accorded to himself the monopoly on the fur trade; settlers sought to open the trade by petitioning King Louis XIV. The king responded by ordering the fur trade to be reopened to all colonists.

Lauzon returned to France, where he continued his business and political career. He died in 1666 at the age of 80, in Paris. One of his descendants, Marie-Catherine-Antoinette de Lauson, married Roland-Michel Barrin de La Galissonière (1747–1749), who also served as Governor of Canada.

Lauzon, Quebec was named in his honour in 1867.

Government offices
Preceded by Louis d'Ailleboust de Coulonge	Governor of New France; 1651–1657	Succeeded by Le Vicomte d'Argenson
