= Doucet =

Doucet family crest

Doucet is a French language surname, especially popular in Canada, the former area of Acadia in particular (now Nova Scotia, New Brunswick, Prince Edward Island, and parts of Quebec and New England).

As a result of the Great Expulsion in 1755 and later from Acadia, Doucets are also amongst the Cajuns and Creoles of Louisiana.

The first Doucet to reach North America is thought to be Major Germain Doucet dit La Verdure, a French military officer at Port-Royal (now Annapolis Royal) in 1632 who attempted to defend what is now Maine and Acadia from invasions from Boston in 1654. Many Doucets in North America trace their lineage to Germain Doucet.

== Variants and pronunciation ==
Common variants include "Doucett" and "Doucette". Most Doucets in Canada pronounce their surname as DOO-set or doo-SET, rather than [dusɛ] as modern French might require. Some argue this pronunciation may derive from dialects of sixteenth-century French such as was found in Brittany, a common origin of French-Canadian settlers.

== Notable people ==
- Albert Doucet (born 1942), Canadian businessman and politician from New Brunswick
- Alexandre Cédric Doucet, Canadian politician from New Brunswick
- Alexandre-Joseph Doucet (1880–1951), Canadian farmer and politician from New Brunswick
- Andrea Doucet, Canadian sociologist and writer
- Benoit Doucet (born 1963), Canadian-German ice hockey coach
- Cat Doucet (1899–1975), American sheriff from Louisiana
- Camey Doucet (born 1939), American musician and disc jockey
- Camille Doucet (1812–1895), French poet and playwright
- Catherine Doucet (1875–1958), American actress
- Clément Doucet (1895–1950), Belgian composer and jazz/classical pianist
- Clive Doucet (born 1946), Canadian politician and writer
- Early Doucet (born 1985), American football player
- Fred Doucet (born 1939), Canadian lobbyist, educator, university administrator, and political aide
- George Doucet (born 1939), Canadian high school principal and politician from Nova Scotia
- Gerald Doucet (1937–2017), Canadian politician from Nova Scotia
- Germain Doucet (1595 – c.1654), called Sieur de la Verdure, French commandant in Maine and Acadia
- Gilbert Doucet (1956–2020), French rugby player
- Henri Lucien Doucet (1856–1895), French painter
- Jacques Doucet (disambiguation), multiple people, including:
  - Jacques Doucet (fashion designer) (1853–1929), French fashion designer
  - Jacques Doucet (sportscaster) (born 1940), French-Canadian sportscaster
  - Jacques Doucet (sailor), French sailor
- Jeff Doucet (died 1984), American kidnapper and child molester, killed by Gary Plauché
- J. André Doucet (1880–1963), Canadian politician from New Brunswick
- Julie Doucet (born 1965), Canadian cartoonist
- Luke Doucet (born 1973), Canadian singer-songwriter and guitarist
- Lyse Doucet (born 1958), Canadian journalist, presenter and correspondent for the BBC
- Michael Doucet (born 1951), American fiddler, singer and songwriter
- Moses J. Doucet (1862–1906), Canadian merchant and politician from Nova Scotia
- Paul Doucet, Canadian actor
- Rick Doucet, Canadian businessman and politician from New Brunswick
- Roger Doucet (1919–1981), Canadian singer
- Sandrine Doucet (1959–2019), French politician
- Suzanne Doucet (born 1944), German composer and producer
- Tommy Doucet (1902–1992), Acadian fiddler, from Nova Scotia, Canada
- Yves Doucet, the name taken by Yves Dreyfus (1931–2021), Olympic medalist épée fencer, to escape Nazi detection during the Nazi occupation of France.
