= Order of Good Cheer =

1606 social group in New France

The Order of Good Cheer
- The Medallion of the Order
- Founding of the Order: November 14, 1606
- Location: Port-Royal, in New France; nowadays in Annapolis County, Nova Scotia, Canada
- Motto: "Fellowship and Good Cheer"
- Original Charter: To share in the fellowship and good cheer enjoyed among the "nevoux noblise" of New France as they wintered together in Port-Royal and to revel in the Glory of King Henri IV.

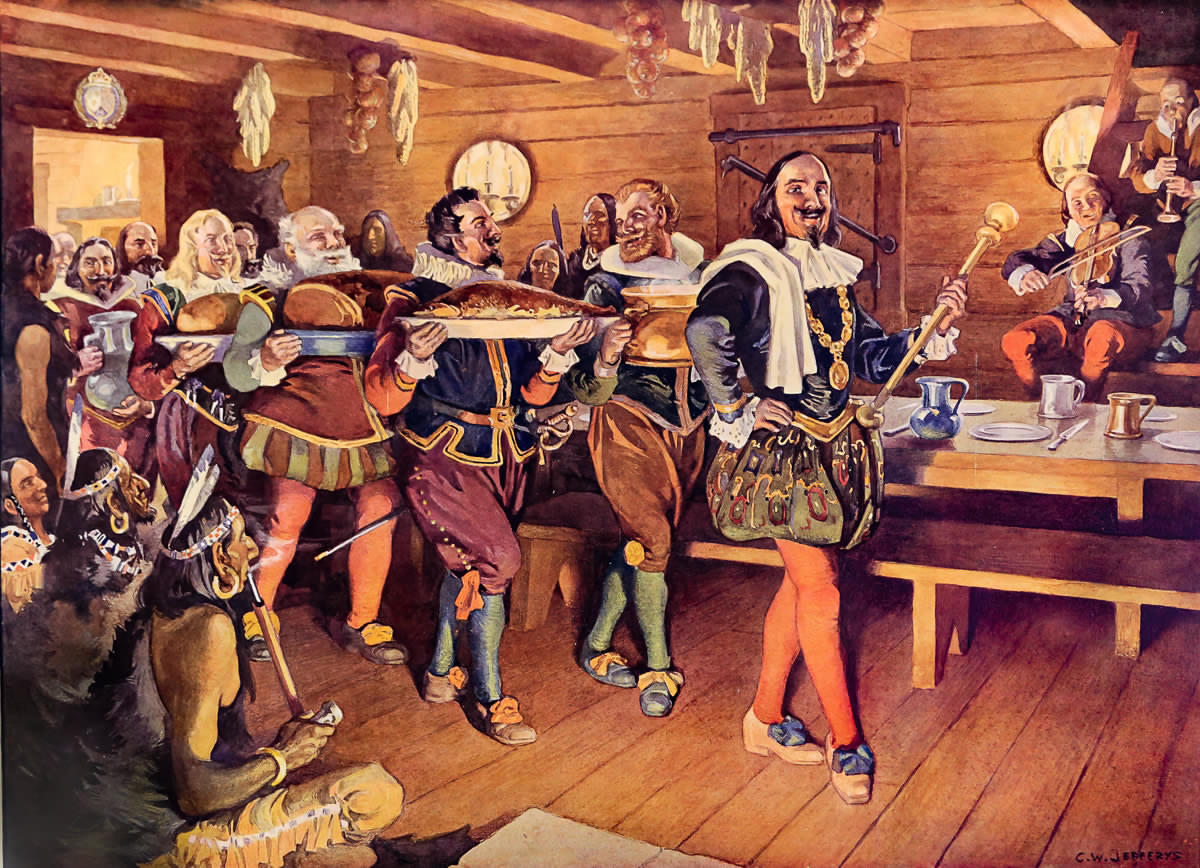
L'Ordre de Bon Temps, 1606

The Order of Good Cheer (French: L'Ordre de Bon Temps) was originally a French Colonial order founded in 1606 by suggestion of Samuel de Champlain. A contemporary order awarded by the province of Nova Scotia bears the same name in continuance of the original order.

== Original order in New France ==
Upon arrival in New France, present day Canada. The Order of Good Cheer was founded at the habitation of Port-Royal and was originally chartered under the royal auspices of the Jean de Biencourt de Poutrincourt et de Saint-Just and Pierre Dugua, Sieur de Mons. The Order's practices were established by the first Chief Steward Marc Lescarbot.

It was after an impossible winter at Ste. Croix Island (on the Atlantic coast of Maine near the present Canada-US border) where many of the first French settlers in North America died of scurvy that the French fur trading colony relocated across the Baie Française (Bay of Fundy) to present-day Nova Scotia, settling the following year in a location they named Port-Royal.

At the time it was believed that "land sickness" (now known as scurvy) was caused by idleness, so Champlain organized the Order to include not just food, but also entertainment. The first meeting, which took place on November 14, 1606, included a theatrical performance called "Le Theatre de Neptune en la Nouvelle-France" ("Neptune's Theatre in New France"). The play pictures Neptune, god of the sea, with a troupe of other divines holding forth about the perils of the sea and the bounty of the New World.

The Baron de Poutrincourt, Intendant to the King of France in North America, had been on an expedition back along the coast of present-day Maine, and, on the occasion of his return to the fort at Port-Royal, the Order was founded at a glorious reception, the preparations for which reportedly involved all those remaining at Port-Royal.

His return on 14 November 1606, is a date to remember in the annals of the New World, as the establishment of the first North American order of chivalry and the birth of the Nouveau Noblesse of New France. The feasting of the Order occurred weekly and continued throughout the winter until the last of March, only to recommence annually in the Fall.

The first toast of the Order made by the Baron de Poutrincourt:

We meet tonight to witness an event that will, I pray, go ringing down the years as marking the sure founding of the Order, which God and France shall ever serve as beacon to our goal.

— Baron de Poutrincourt

Quoting Lescarbot, the French historian François-Edme Rameau de Saint-Père writes:

Poutrincourt returned from his excursion on the 14th November, 1606; Lescarbot, who was always full of ideas, and who knew, no doubt, the useful part to be obtained by exterior demonstrations, foresaw to prepare for his honor a quasi- triumphal return from his voyage; Nature itself has already furnished the principal initiative, and advantage of it had been taken, everywhere were decorations and garlands of natural green; a magnificent forest hid the rusticity of wooden buildings and huts; even a theatre was built where allegoric scenes were represented; there was a feast, a discharge of musketry, and as much noise as could be made by some fifty men, joined by a few Indians, whose families served as spectators.

In 1606, there were fewer than 70 men at Port-Royal. Lescarbot states that, in total, about 50 Frenchmen, joined by indigenous people, participated in the welcoming home of Poutrincourt and the first gathering of the Order. However, only fifteen men of birth are recognized as founding the Order. These would have been the only men present at the time of sufficient social standing with whom Champlain and the Baron de Poutrincourt would care to dine. The guests of the Order likely sat at other tables, probably getting equally good dinners as the rest, but without being recognized as official members of the Order.

Likely everyone at the settlement took part in the staging of "Le Théâtre de Neptune en la Nouvelle-France," written by Lescarbot and performed at the first celebration Order, which was the first European theatrical performance in North America.

=== Founding Chevaliers ===
The founding Chevaliers of the Order were those who normally dined at Sieur Poutrincourt's table. The main table of Poutrincourt, in the great hall of the fort was reserved for fifteen gentlemen of birth who are credited as the founding Matries d'Hotel or members of the Order and were known as The Nevoux Noblise of New France.

According to official documents, Baron Poutrincourt was, no doubt, the Grand Knight of the Order, followed by Champlain, Lescarbot, Louis Hébert, Charles de Biencourt, Claude de La Tour, Charles de La Tour, Daniel Hay, Champdore, leaving six unknown, but the records note that Sagamore Membertou was always treated as their equal; it is quite certain he was at that table, leaving five to be accounted for, if documents to that effect can be found.

Lescarbot's account of the Order is best translated in Murdoch's (v. 1, p 34), in which is described the gathering of the Order:

There were 15 guests (at Poutrincourt's table), each of whom in his turn, became steward and caterer of the day. At the dinner, the steward, with napkin on shoulder, staff of office in hand, and the collar of the order round his neck, led the van. The other guests in procession followed, each bearing a dish. After grace in the evening, he resigned the insignia to his successor, and they drank to each other in a cup of wine. It was the steward's duty, to look to supplies, and he would go hunt or fish a day or two before his turn came, and add some dainty to the ordinary fare. During the winter they had fowl and game in abundance, supplied by the Indians and by their own exertions. These feasts were often attended by Indians of all ages and both sexes, sometimes twenty or thirty being present. The Sagamore, or chief, Membertou, the greatest Sagamore of the land, and other chiefs, when there, were treated as guests and equals.

Champlain's account of the Order:

We spent this winter very joyously and of good times, due to the L'Ordre de Bon Temps that I established here, which each person finds useful for their health and more beneficial than any sort of medicine that we could have used. The Order was presented as a Chain of office that we placed with some small ceremony, at the neck of one of our people, charging him that day with going hunting; the next day we gave it to another and thus consequently: all who wished to try would do their best and bring the most beautiful hunt: We don't find it half bad, as well as the Indians who were with us. (Voyages of Champlain: 1613)

Description of the order of Good Cheer:

The first winters of the French in Acadie were very painful and cost the life of several men. One has to only think of the first winter in the Sainte-Croix Island in 1604-1605 when more than thirty men of the company died from scurvy. The winters in Port-Royal were less rigorous, but nonetheless long and dull.

To brighten the atmosphere and foster the esprit de corps amongst the sieur de Poutrincourt, lord of Port-Royal's staff members, Samuel de Champlain had the idea to create "the order of Good-Cheer" during the winter 1606–1607. In turn, the members of the small elite of Port-Royal were to prepare a gastronomical meal for their fellow-members, with the fruit of their hunting and fishing in the rich Acadian natural environment plentiful with game and fish of various kinds. From time to time, the sagamo Membertou and its close relations were also invited to share the feast during which the person in charge of the eve entered ceremoniously in the main room of the Habitation wearing around his neck the collar of the Order that he would tend to the future host of the next evening. In the current rebuilt Habitation, today a national historical place of Canada, one can easily imagine the atmosphere of these evenings. The government of the province of Nova Scotia reestablished the order of the Good Cheer and it is possible to become join it. (H.P. Biggar in The Works of Samuel de Champlain)

A certificate giving honorary membership in the Order can be obtained at some of Nova Scotia's tourism offices. One site that does this and is readily available to visitors from cruise ships is the main building on the Halifax dock.

== Revival ==
On May 11, 2001, the Speaker of the House in Nova Scotia, Canada, the Hon. Murray Scott reaffirmed official recognition of the order in Canada as grant of the province under the custodianship of the Nova Scotia Ministry of Heritage. According to resolution 1111, the minimum condition of membership to the order is that a pledge to visit Nova Scotia must be made. The order is generally presented in recognition of individuals valued by the province of Nova Scotia or in honour of the Acadian tradition in Canada.

One becomes a member of the Order of Good Cheer by receiving an invitation from the province of Nova Scotia or by a chevalier / member of the order. Membership in the order is differentiated from honorary membership. Honorary membership is given out by Tourism Nova Scotia, whereas actual membership in the order is by invitation of the province of Nova Scotia.
