= Port-Royal (Acadia) =

Historic settlement in modern-day Nova Scotia, Canada

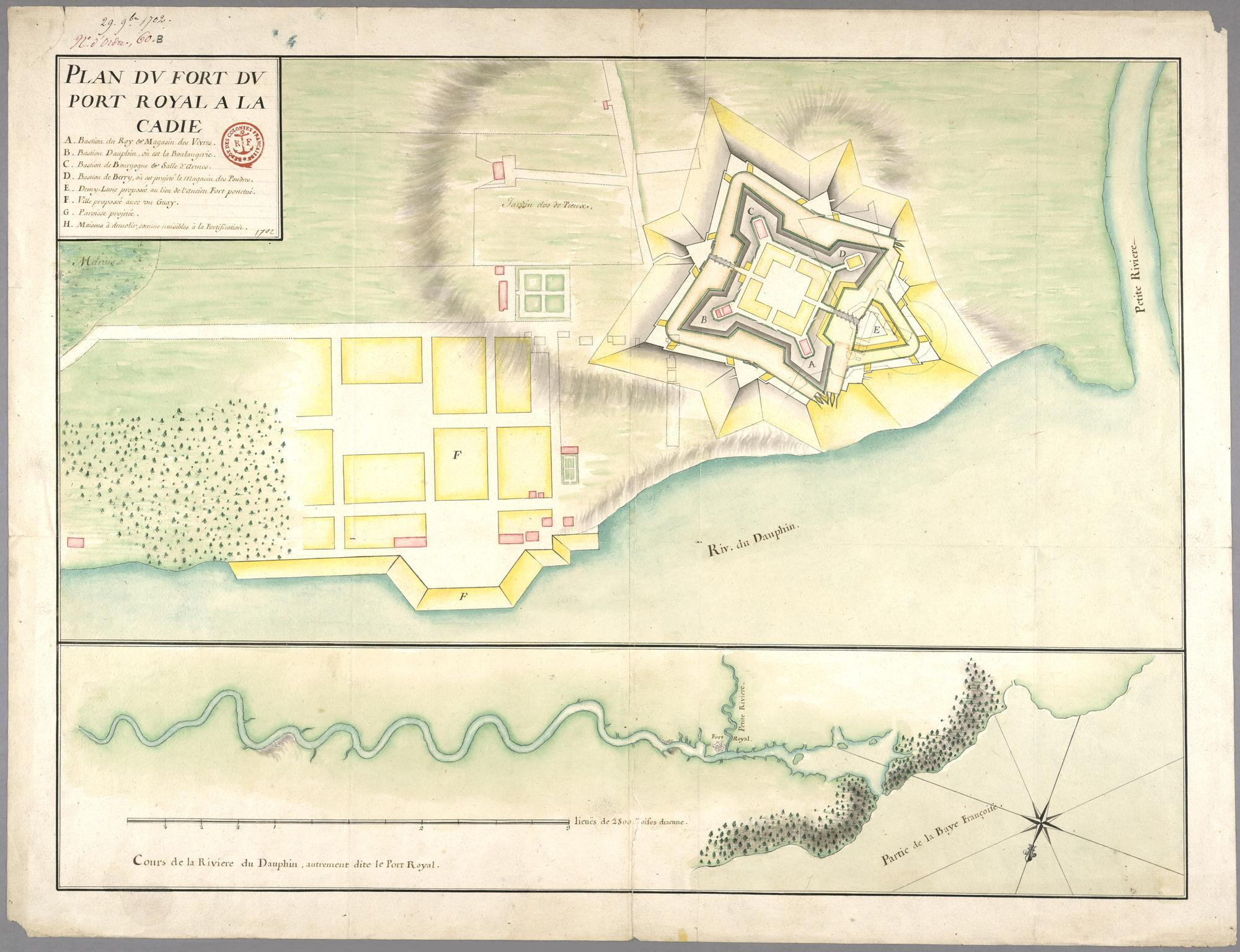
- Fort at Port-Royal (1702)

- Location within Nova Scotia
- 44°44′N 65°32′W
- Location: Annapolis Basin

Port Royal (1605–1713) was a historic settlement based around the upper Annapolis Basin in Nova Scotia, Canada, and the predecessor of the modern town of Annapolis Royal.

Port Royal was the first successful attempt by Europeans to establish a permanent settlement in what is today known as Canada and was a critical step in the establishment of New France. It was the first permanent base of exploration for Samuel de Champlain, who would later found Quebec in 1608. It was also where Louis Hébert pioneered many European agricultural practices in the New World, including viticulture, arboriculture and cereal farming, before resettling at Quebec in 1617.

For most of its existence, it was the capital of the New France colony of Acadia. Over its 108 years, control of the settlement passed numerous times between France, Scotland, England and Great Britain until it was formally ceded to Great Britain in 1713 due to the Treaty of Utrecht.

From 1605 to 1613 the settlement was centred around the habitation on the north side of the Annapolis Basin, while from 1629 onwards the focus was around Fort Anne on the south side, at the confluence of the Annapolis River and Allain's Creek.

== Toponymy ==
"Port Royal" principally refers to the Annapolis Basin and was named by cartographer Samuel de Champlain in 1604, writing, "we entered a harbour which is two leagues in length and one in breadth, which I have named 'Port Royal'". In the censuses of Acadia from 1671 to 1707, all inhabitants living around the Annapolis Basin were listed under "Port Royal", with no sub-distinctions. The first official document where "Port Royal" was called a ville (i.e. town) appears to be in article 12 of the Treaty of Utrecht in 1713, where it describes, "la ville de Port-Royal, maintenant appelée Annapolis Royale".

== Original settlement of Port Royal (1605–1613) ==
French nobleman Pierre Du Gua de Mons made a first attempt at settlement of Acadia during the disastrous winter of 1604–1605 in Île-Saint-Croix, Saint Croix Island in the St. Croix River on the boundary between present-day Maine and New Brunswick. (Note: Located on an island in the Saint Croix River between present-day Maine and New Brunswick, the Saint Croix settlement failed because the surrounding river became impassable in the winter. It cut off the settlers from necessary supplies of fresh food, water, and fuel wood.)

De Mons, Samuel de Champlain, Louis Hébert (this is disputed in the French archives which indicate Hébert did not sail until 1606) and Jean de Biencourt de Poutrincourt et de Saint-Just decided to move the settlement to the north shore of the present-day Annapolis Basin, a sheltered bay on the south shore of the Bay of Fundy that had been recorded by Champlain earlier in the spring of 1605 during a coastal reconnaissance. Champlain noted in his journals that the bay was of impressive size; he believed it would be an adequate anchorage for several hundred ships of the French Royal Fleet, if ever necessary. As such, he named the basin "Port Royal", the Royal Port; this was, for many years, the name of both the body of water and of the subsequent French settlements in that region. Poutrincourt asked King Henri IV to become the owner of the seigneurie that encompassed the settlement.

Nestled against the North Mountain range, they set about constructing a log stockade fortification. With assistance from members of the Mi'kmaq Nation and a local chief named Membertou, coupled with the more temperate climate of the fertile Annapolis Valley, the settlement, also known as "the habitation" prospered.

Mindful of the disastrous winter of 1604–05 at the Île-Saint-Croix settlement, Champlain established l'Ordre de Bon Temps (the Order of Good Cheer) as a social club ostensibly to promote better nutrition and to get settlers through the winter of 1606–07. Supper every few days became a feast with a festive air supplemented by performances and alcohol and was primarily attended by the prominent men of the colony and their Mi'kmaq neighbours while the Mi'kmaq women, children, and poorer settlers looked on and were offered food. Marc Lescarbot's The Theatre of Neptune in New France, the first work of theater written and performed in North America, was performed on November 14, 1606.

In 1607, Dugua had his fur trade monopoly revoked by the Government of France, forcing most of the settlers to return to France that fall, although some remained with the natives. The Habitation was left in the care of Membertou and the local Mi'kmaq until 1610 when Sieur de Poutrincourt, another French nobleman, returned with a small expedition to Port-Royal. Poutrincourt converted Membertou and local Mi'kmaq to Catholicism, hoping to gain financial assistance from the French government. As a result, Jesuits became financial partners with Poutrincourt, although this caused division within the community. In May 1613, the Jesuits moved on to the Penobscot River valley.

=== Battle of Port Royal (1613) ===
In July 1613 Acadia settlements were attacked by the English, led by the Admiral of Virginia Samuel Argall. The invasion began with the Saint-Saveur mission (Mount Desert Island, Maine) and then St. Croix Island. In October 1613, Argall surprised the settlers at Port-Royal and sacked every building. The battle destroyed the Habitation but it did not fully destroy the colony. Argall returned in November that same year and finally burned the Habitation to the ground while settlers were away nearby.

== Informal period (1613–1629) ==
Poutrincourt returned from France in spring 1614 to find Port-Royal in ruins, settlers living with the Mi'kmaq, and Biencourt and his men remaining in the area of Port-Royal. A mill upstream at present day Lequille, Nova Scotia remained, along with settlers who went into hiding during the battle. Charles de Saint-Étienne de la Tour was one of the men who stayed behind. La Tour eventually left Port-Royal and settled by 1620, at Cape Negro - Cape Sable although some settlers remained.

Poutrincourt assigned his holdings to his son and returned to France. The settlement of Port-Royal was re-established on the south bank of the river 8 km (5.0 mi) upstream.

Poutrincourt's son bequeathed the settlement to Charles de la Tour upon his own death in 1623.

== Scottish colony (1629–1632) ==
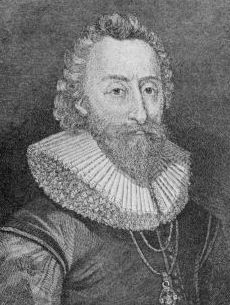
William Alexander, 1st Earl of Stirling

In 1621 King James VI and I as King of Scotland granted to Sir William Alexander, 1st Earl of Stirling a Royal Charter of all of Nova Scotia, which then included New Brunswick. During the Anglo-French War (1627–1629), under Charles I of England, by 1629 the Kirkes took Quebec City and Lord Ochiltree (Sir James Stewart of Killeith) started a colony on Cape Breton Island at Baleine.

On July 28, 1629, Sir William sent a ship, his son William Alexander (the younger), and seventy Scottish settlers who established the first incarnation of "New Scotland" which they named Charles Fort, at present-day Annapolis Royal on the site of the future Fort Anne (see Charles Fort - National Site). During this time there were few French inhabitants in the colony. This set of British triumphs, leaving Cape Sable (present-day Port La Tour, Nova Scotia) as the only major French holding in North America, was not destined to last.

In 1632, under the terms of the Treaty of Saint Germain-en-Laye, the colonists were ordered to abandon the fort to the French, who soon renamed it Port-Royal, the same name as their previous colony. The official handover did not take place until late in 1632 and this gave Captain Andrew Forrester, commander of the then Scottish community the opportunity to cross the Bay of Fundy with twenty-five armed men and raid Charles de Saint-Étienne de la Tour's Fort Sainte-Marie-de-Grâce on the LaHave River which served as the Acadian capital before the re-establishment of Port-Royal. (Note: There is a monument to Sir William Alexander in Victoria Park, Halifax – see Sir Alexander Monument. The name and flag of Nova Scotia were also established at this time.)

== French colony (1632–1654) ==
In 1633, protecting the boundary of Acadia, Charles de Saint-Étienne de la Tour, who at this time was the French commander of Acadia, made a descent upon Machias, Maine from his seat at Port-Royal, killing two of its six defenders, and carrying the others away along with their supplies.

In 1635, Governor of Acadia Charles de Menou d'Aulnay de Charnisay moved a number of LaHave settlers to Port-Royal. Under D'Aulnay, the Acadians built the first dykes in North America and cultivated the reclaimed salt marshes. During this time, Acadia was plunged into what some historians have described as a civil war; the two main centres were Port-Royal, where d'Aulnay was stationed, and Fort Sainte-Marie, where de la Tour was stationed.

=== Acadian Civil War ===
==== Battle of Port Royal (1640) ====
Charles de la Tour attacked Port-Royal with two armed ships. D'Aulnay's captain was killed, while La Tour and his men were forced to surrender. In response to the attack, D'Aulay sailed out of Port-Royal to establish a blockade of La Tour's Fort Sainte-Marie.

==== Battle of Port Royal (1643) ====
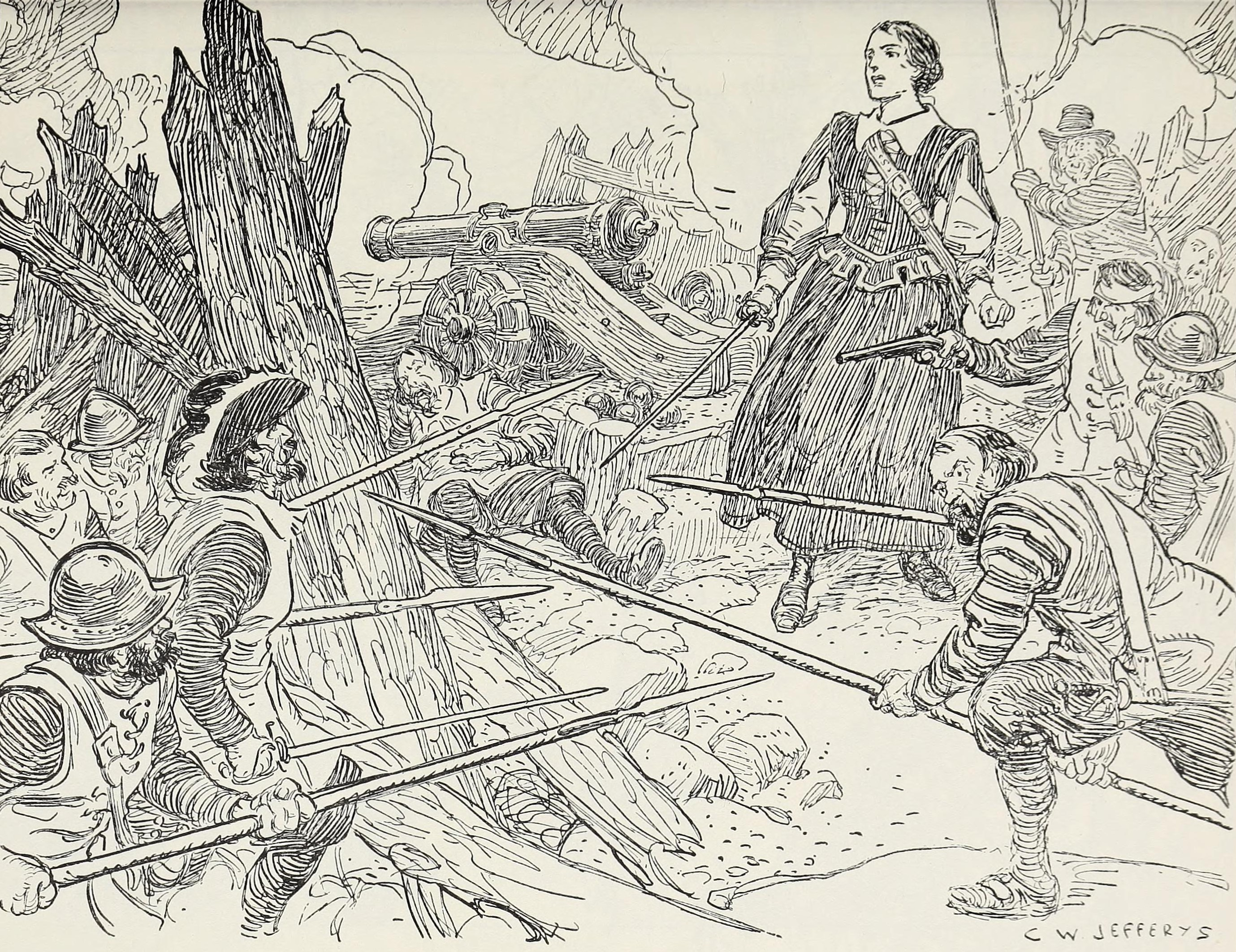
Siege of St. John (1645) – d'Aulnay defeats La Tour in Acadia

In 1643, La Tour tried to capture Port-Royal again. La Tour arrived at Saint John from Boston with a fleet of five armed vessels and 270 men and broke the blockade. La Tour then chased d'Aulnay's vessels back across the Bay of Fundy to Port-Royal. D'Aulnay resisted the attack, and seven of his men were wounded and three killed. La Tour did not attack the fort, which was defended by twenty soldiers. La Tour burned the mill, killed the livestock and seized furs, gunpowder and other supplies.

D'Aulnay ultimately won the war against La Tour with the 1645 siege of Fort Sainte-Marie. After the siege, La Tour went to live in Quebec. After defeating La Tour, d'Aulnay administered posts at LaHave, Nova Scotia; Pentagouet (Castine, Maine); Canso, Nova Scotia; Cap Sable (Port La Tour, Nova Scotia); the Saint John River (Bay of Fundy) and Miscou Island, with Port-Royal as the capital.

After d'Aulnay died (1650), La Tour re-established himself in Acadia.

== English colony (1654–1667) ==
=== Battle of Port Royal (1654) ===
In 1654, Colonel Robert Sedgwick led the English Invasion of Acadia with a force made up of 533 New England militia of the New England Confederation and 200 professional soldiers sent to New England by Oliver Cromwell, the first professional English soldiers sent to North America. Prior to the battle to capture Port-Royal, Sedgwick captured and plundered present day Castine, Maine and Fort Sainte-Marie at New Brunswick. Sedgwick also took Charles de la Tour prisoner.

The defenders of Port-Royal numbered only about 130, led by the Commandant, Germain Doucet de la Verdure. After resisting the English landings and defending the fort during a short siege, the outnumbered Acadians surrendered after negotiating terms that allowed French inhabitants who wished to remain to keep their property and religion. Soldiers and officials were given transport to France while the majority of Port-Royal residents remained unharmed. However, in violation of the surrender terms, Sedgwick's men rampaged through the Port-Royal monastery, smashing windows, doors, paneling and even the floor boards before burning the monastery and the newly constructed Port Royal church. The English occupied Acadia for the next 16 years with a small garrison, leaving the Acadian residents mostly undisturbed.

== French colony (1667–1713) ==
In 1667, Port-Royal was returned to France with the Treaty of Breda (1667). In a census taken in 1671 there were 361 Acadians in the Port-Royal area. During King Philip's War, Jacques de Chambly was Governor of Acadia. Another census in the late 1680s shows 450 Acadians in the entire area of Port-Royal.

=== King William's War ===
==== Battle of Port Royal (1690) ====
During King William's War, Port-Royal served as a safe harbor for French cruisers and supply point for Wabanaki Confederacy to attack the New England colonies encroaching on the Acadian border in southern Maine.

The Battle of Port Royal (1690) began on May 9. Sir William Phips of New England arrived with 736 men in seven English ships. Acadian Governor de Meneval fought for two days and then capitulated. The garrison was imprisoned in the church and Governor de Meneval was confined to his house. The New Englanders levelled what was begun of the new fort. The residents of Port-Royal were imprisoned in the church and administered an oath of allegiance to the English King.

Phips left, but warships from New York City arrived in June which resulted in more destruction. The seamen burned and looted the settlement, including the parish church.

==== Raid on Port Royal (1693) ====
In response to assisting Pierre Maisonnat dit Baptiste, English frigates attacked Port-Royal. The New Englanders burned almost a dozen houses and three barns full of grain. Port Royal was again made the Acadian capital in 1699.

=== Queen Anne's War ===
During Queen Anne's War (1702–1713), there was a New England blockade of Port Royal and then three attempts to lay siege to the capital. The last siege ultimately resulted in the British conquest of Acadia and Nova Scotia. Despite the blockade, Port Royal was occasionally used as a home port by French privateers and pirates such as Captain Crapo.

==== Blockade of Port Royal (1704) ====
In 1704, in retaliation for the Raid on Deerfield, Major Benjamin Church created a blockade of Port-Royal. Church was instructed not to attack the capital because the action was not authorized from London. Before daylight, on July 2, two English warships and seven smaller vessels entered the Port Royal basin. They captured the guard station opposite Goat Island as well as four Acadians. Landing at Pointe aux Chesnes on the north shore, they took a family prisoner. A woman from the family was sent to the fort to demand its surrender. The blockade lasted seventeen days; those in the fort awaited an attack. Church had moved on to conduct the real purpose of his expedition: the Raid on Grand Pré, Raid on Pisiguit, and Raid on Chignecto. He returned to Port Royal and then with a brief exchange of gunfire, returned to Boston.

==== Siege of Port Royal (June 1707) ====
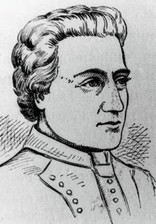
Daniel d'Auger de Subercase

Two major British efforts to besiege the town in 1707 met with failure. The first siege during the war happened on June 17 and lasted eleven days. Colonel John March, the most senior officer in all of Massachusetts was sent to defeat the capital. Acadian governor Daniel d'Auger de Subercase successfully defended the capital.

==== Siege of Port Royal (August 1707) ====
Colonel Francis Wainwright led the second siege on August 20. It lasted eleven days. Subercase and his troops killed sixteen New Englanders and lost three soldiers. Again the British retreated.

==== Siege of Port Royal (1710) ====
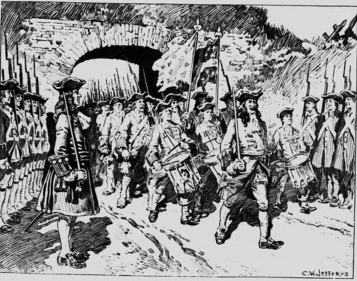
Evacuation Of Port Royal 1710 by CW Jefferys

On September 24, 1710, the British returned with 36 ships and 2000 men, and again laid siege to the capital in what would be the final Conquest of Acadia. Subercase and the French held out until October 2 when the approximately 300 defenders of the fort surrendered, ending French rule in Acadia. The following year, after the Acadian and Indian success at the nearby Battle of Bloody Creek (1711), the Acadians and Indians unsuccessfully attempted to lay siege to the capital.

== British colony (After 1713) ==
After the transfer of Port Royal to Great Britain due to the Treaty of Utrecht in 1713, the British changed the name from Port Royal to Annapolis Royal.

== Colonial context ==
The Acadia settlement of Port-Royal was the first permanent European settlement north of St. Augustine, Florida. (Two years later, the English made their first permanent settlement in Jamestown, Virginia.) Approximately seventy-five years after Port-Royal was founded, Acadians spread out from the capital to found the other major Acadian settlements established before the Expulsion of the Acadians: Grand-Pré, Chignecto, Cobequid and Pisiguit.

In the 150 years prior to the founding of Halifax in 1749, Port-Royal/Annapolis Royal was the capital of Acadia and later Nova Scotia for most decades. (Note: For the 144 years prior to the founding of Halifax (1749), Port-Royal (1605–13) and Annapolis Royal, Nova Scotia (1613 onward) was the capital of Acadia for 112 of those years (78% of the time). The other locations that served as the Capital of Acadia are: present day LaHave, Nova Scotia (1632–36 ); present day Castine, Maine (1670–74); present day Sackville, New Brunswick / Amherst, Nova Scotia known as Beaubassin (1678–84); present day Jemseg, New Brunswick(1690–91); present day Fredericton, New Brunswick (1691–98), and present day Saint John, New Brunswick (1698–99).) During that time the British made six attempts to conquer Acadia by attacking the capital at Port-Royal. They finally defeated the French in 1710 following the Siege of Port-Royal. Over the following fifty years, the French and their allies made six unsuccessful military attempts to regain the capital. Including a raid by Americans in the American Revolution, Port-Royal (at present-day Annapolis Royal) faced a total of thirteen attacks, more than any other place in North America.

Port-Royal was the site of a number of North American firsts: the first resident surgeon; first continuing church services; first social club (named the "Order of Good Cheer"); creation of the first library; first French theatrical performance (titled Neptune); first apothecary; and first weekly Bible class. The author of Neptune, Marc Lescarbot, wrote a popular history of his time in New France, entitled Histoire de la Nouvelle-France (1609).

The north shore of the Annapolis Basin is today the site of the replica reconstruction of the original Habitation at Port-Royal.

== See also ==
- Annapolis Royal
- Port-Royal National Historic Site
- Military history of Nova Scotia
- Lordship of Port-Royal
