= English invasion of Acadia (1654) =

1654 incursion into the French colony of Acadia

- Part of First Anglo-Dutch War
Date	July–September, 1654
Location	Acadia/Maine & Nova Scotia
Result	English Victory: Acadia becomes a colony from 1654 to 1667

Belligerents
Commonwealth of England; New England Confederation	France/New France

Commanders and leaders
(England) Robert Sedgwick; John Leverett	Charles de Saint-Étienne de la Tour; Emmanuel Le Borgne; Germain Doucet

Strength
Land: ~753 English soldiers and militia (unknown number of sailors) Sea: ~4 ships	215 defenders

Casualties and losses
1 killed and 6 wounded	5 killed 210 captured

The English invasion of Acadia was a 1654 incursion into the French colony of Acadia spurred on in part from an aborted attempt to invade New Netherland as a consequence of the First Anglo-Dutch War. While preparations were being made in New England for an incursion into New Netherland, the expeditions leader Robert Sedgwick received word that the war had ended. However, Sedgwick's orders also stipulated that if time permitted that he could take over other territories of the French. The casus belli was in retaliation for French privateers on maritime commerce, as promoted by Charles II and Prince Rupert. With a mix of both English Soldiers, New England militia, and a small flotilla, Sedgwick captured the forts of Saint John and Port Royal, and Pentagouet (now Castine, Maine). Thus, Acadia was captured by the English, and it was administered as a colony from 1654 to 1667, until it was returned per agreement in the Treaty of Breda (1667), which concluded the Second Anglo-Dutch War. Ultimately over a hundred years later, Acadia would be taken over again by the English (now British after the Acts of Union 1707) during Father Le Loutre's War and the French and Indian War, which resulted in the Expulsion of the Acadians and the absorption of Acadia into other English colonies.

== Background ==
=== English preparation for war ===
In the midst of the First Anglo-Dutch War, the New England colonies of New Haven, Plymouth, Connecticut, Massachusetts Bay, and Maine, were rapidly becoming aggravated over the neighboring Dutch and French colonies. As such New Somersetshire's governor William Hooke, dispatched a letter to Oliver Cromwell complaining that Massachusetts as not ready for war while the other colonies were. He illustrated that the Dutch and French were preventing the English colonies from expanding, had a decent naval position, and were trading weapons to the Native Americans. Hooke further implored Cromwell, to send two to three ships for a coordinated New England based attack on the Dutch and force Massachusetts to participate.

In response, Cromwell commissioned Robert Sedgwick as general of the fleet and commander-in-chief of all the New England coast, with the added authority to commence hostilities on both the Dutch and if possible, the French. Cromwell further gave Sedgwick the authority to negotiate terms of surrender but was instructed to be merciful to the conquered and to give them the option of staying under English rule or they would be permitted to return to their mother countries.

Cromwell outfitted Sedgwick with four ships, the 38-gun Black Raven, the 34-gun Hope, and two troop transport ships, the Augustine, and the Church. Accompanying Sedgwick were 200 red coated New Model Army soldiers in two separate companies from the Ingoldsby and Goffe regiments and possibly a handful of volunteers from other units. Cromwell dispatched Sedgwick to Boston with the flotilla, however after suffering stormy weather and arriving at Faial, it was determined that the Black Raven, could not safely make the Atlantic crossing and she was sent home. However, the rest of the convoy was able to make it to Boston on July 1, 1654. Sedgwick's soldiers are the first English soldiers to arrive in North America as a military unit, as opposed to arriving as individuals.

Upon arriving in Boston, Sedgwick approached his son-in-law Captain John Leverett, a selectman member of the general court, and military leader who immediately began making arrangements to mobilize militia throughout the New England Confederation to bolster Sedgwick's force. The Confederation was an alliance of the New England colonies for mutual defense. Leverett assembled the Confederation's council where Leverett was appointed as captain-general. All Confederation colonies agreed to provide and supply militia, accept Massachusetts Bay, which posed a problem as they were the major supplier of troops and supplies in the region. Without Massachusetts support assembling the militia was a nonstarter, so Sedgwick had to send a petition to Cromwell to compel Massachusetts to participate in the war. With the addition of Massachusetts there were 170 men from Massachusetts Bay, 133 from New Haven, 200 from Connecticut, and 50 from the Plymouth colony, for a grand total of 533 militia from the Confederation. In addition, at some point Sedgwick had secured a Ketch as a fourth ship to his navy.

It was June 20 by the time the militia assembled; however, a letter arrived the same day stating the First Anglo-Dutch War had just ended and there was peace between the English and the Dutch. Not wishing to waste the mobilization of his force, Sedgwick elected to pursue Cromwell's secondary objective of attacking the French. After fully assembling his units, Sedgwick set sail from Nanatasket to French waters on the edges of the Saint John River. The French were weak, vulnerable, and unaware. The Acadians were still reeling from their ongoing civil war which had reached a new phase.

=== Acadian Civil War ===
The civil war had begun in 1635 in response to an overlapping claim of authority by two Acadian governors. Charles de Saint-Étienne de la Tour the Huguenot Protestant governor of Saint John and Charles de Menou d'Aulnay the Catholic governor of Port Royal. The King had given both men titles to overlapping claims and their differences of religion and personality culminated in a military struggle. At one point New England colonies provided, La Tour with military and financial support as they saw him as a fellow Protestant and he allowed New Englanders to freely fish and lumber in the Bay of Fundy. However, ultimately d'Aulnay won the first phase of the civil war and La Tour fled into exile to Quebec in 1645. However, d'Aulnay died in 1650 and La Tour returned and married d'Aulnay's wife in 1653 and sought to restake his claim to governorship. La Tour soon realized his reclamation of the governorship would not be one so easily won, for a new rival emerged in that of Emmanuel Le Borgne. Le Borgne had a claim to La Tour's estate, and he was backed by the Duke of Vendôme. To secure his claim to governorship, Le Borgne took a ship and 100 men and immediately attacked La Tour's holdings and began raiding Pentagouet (Castine, Maine), LaHave, Nova Scotia, Nipisguit (Bathurst, New Brunswick), and Saint-Pierre. This new infighting marked the second albeit, short lived phase of the Acadian civil war, that would soon be interrupted by Sedgwick's impending incursion.

== Invasion ==
=== Siege of Saint John ===
At the time of the first English attack, Le Borgne was in the midst of attacking Fort La Tour in Saint John, which was under La Tour's command, but he quickly broke off the engagement upon learning of Sedgwick's fast approaching arrival. Le Borgne retreated to Port Royal on July 13 and Sedgwick arrived the next day on July 14. At this point, La Tour accused Le Borgne of conspiring and communicating with the English as he provided no material or military support over a common enemy, and for communicating with them.

In any event, Sedgwick immediately besieged Saint John which La Tour defended with 79 men and 19 cannon. Sedgwick maintained a steady stream of marine based canon fire, and gradually landed men and canons to tighten the siege and construct entrenchments. La Tour realized his situation was dire raised the white flag. Whereupon La tour's surrendering, Sedgwick at once set about despoiling Saint John of all the furs he could find, which in total amounted to about £10,000 sterling in the prices of the day. Sedgwick, imprisoned the defenders aboard his ships and left 18 regulars of the Ingoldsby regiment and an unknown number of New England Colony militia to maintain and hold the fort while Sedgwick continued the campaign.

=== Siege of Port Royal ===
Sedgwick took his remaining forces and sailed to Port Royal which was under Le Borgne's control. Sedgwick had some of his men disembark to begin the siege of Port Royal's fort and a number of Le Borgne's men ambushed Sedgwick's vanguard which killed 1 of his men and wounded 6 more. However, the English regulars quickly charged the ambushers, gave them no time to reload, killed 5, and forced the others to retreat back into the fort.

The siege continued only for a short time until August the 8th when Le Borgne surrendered with generous conditions. The English had captured 113 men, over 23 cannons, 500 weapons, 50 barrels of gunpowder, and Le Borgne's ship the Châteaufort which itself had a large supply of alcohol. In return for his surrender, Le Borgne was generally given extremely lenient conditions whereby he was allowed to keep the Châteaufort and return disarmed to France, with his supply of alcohol. His sons were also allowed to remain as hostages to safeguard his holdings at Port-Royal, La Hève, and beyond. Many Acadians like La Tour previously accused Le Borgne of treason with the enemy. Although, it should also be noted that Sedgwick did have the livestock of Port Royal slaughtered.

=== Capture of Fort Pentagouet ===
On September 2 Sedgwick captured Fort Pentagouët. It was defended by 18 men commanded by a Captain Germain Doucet de la Verdure. Again Sedgwick gave magnanimous terms of surrender given his overwhelmingly force. He allowed La Verdure and his men to march out of the fort with their arms, flags and families, along to the beat of drum and fife as they went into captivity. Sedgwick had also captured the 8 canons and 3 mortars.

== Aftermath ==
=== Fate of Acadia ===
Having secured Acadia at Pentagouet, Sedgwick left redcoat garrisons in all forts. He left John Levertt as governor of Acadia which would later be confirmed by Cromwell on April 3, 1655. The General Court of Massachusetts had a thanksgiving celebration on September 20, 1654. Sedgwick returned to Boston and sailed back to London on board a ship called the Hopewell, along with the remaining redcoats and with many of the prisoners including both La Tour and La Verdure. Cromwell was pleased with Sedgwick, as he was leveraging power with the Spanish and French in negotiations to see which side England would fight for in a war that would ultimately aid in England's interests. Ultimately the English did side with the French through the Treaty of Paris (1657) which merged the Anglo-Spanish War (1654–1660) with the larger Franco-Spanish War (1635–1659). The French had previously supported the exiled Charles II, but the French entered into a defensive alliance with England and Charles signed a new treaty with Spain (the royalist Treaty of Brussels (1656)) which caused Charles to leave to Spain. However, Cromwell never used Acadia as a bargaining chip for English involvement on the French side. It would not be till the later English defeat in the Second Anglo-Dutch War and the concluding Treaty of Breda (1667) that Acadia would be exchanged for other captured English territories. While Acadia was officially signed over back to France in 1667, the official handover did not occur until 1670.

=== Fate of Fort La Tour ===
In 1657 a New English governor named Thomas Temple took over, and in 1659 he built a fortified outpost at Jemseg. Fort La Tour fell out of use and was later abandoned, and later would be destroyed at an unknown time between the 17th or early-18th century.

== See also ==
- New Netherland settlements
- Huguenot rebellions
- Westphalian system
- Acadians
- Raid on Acadia (1613)
- Conquest of Acadia (1710)
