= Membertou =

Membertou may refer to:

- Membertou First Nation, in Nova Scotia, Canada
- Henri Membertou (c. 1507 – 1611), chief of the Mi'kmaq First Nations tribe
