= Nicolas Aubry =

Nicolas Aubry was a French priest who accompanied Pierre Dugua, Sieur de Monts to Acadia in 1604. There were two other clergy on this expedition, a priest who was to minister to the parish of Port Royal and a Protestant minister. This expedition had as its cartographer Samuel de Champlain. There were also 77 other settlers.

Champlain, in his writings, reported a violent quarrel over religion between the Protestant minister and a curé which ended in blows. The priest was, in all likelihood, Nicolas Aubry.

He also was recorded in writings from that time because of a mis-adventure which happened to him during his short visit to the New World. He became lost in the woods around Baie Sainte-Marie, Nova Scotia and survived for sixteen days on his own before being rescued from the shores of the Bay of Fundy by a fisherman. He returned to France after his recovery and the last known record of him is in 1611.
