= Devils Head Site =

- U.S. National Register of Historic Places
- Nearest city: Calais, Maine
- Area: 0.4 acres (0.16 ha)
- NRHP reference No.: 06000395
- Added to NRHP: May 17, 2006

The Devils Head Site, designated Site 97.10 by the Maine Archaeological Survey, is a prehistoric and historic archaeological site in Calais, Maine. Located on the banks of the St. Croix River, it is a shell midden site with evidence of multiple periods of human habitation, from the Middle Ceramic Period (c. 200-600 CE) to the Late Contact Period (mid-18th century) and beyond. With its location near Saint Croix Island, the site of an early French settlement in 1604, the site's finds may provide insight into early French-Native relations in the area. The site was listed on the National Register of Historic Places in 2006.

== Description ==
Devils Head is a promontory in eastern Calais, overlooking the St. Croix River near its confluence with Oak Bay. The river at this point turns from a generally easterly direction southward, flowing toward Passamaquoddy Bay and the Bay of Fundy. Most of Devils Head is currently conservation land, owned by the city of Calais.

The Devils Head Site, identified in a 2003 state survey, is located on a shelf of glacial till, overlooking the river in this area. Its principal feature is a shell midden, within which a number of habitation layers are found. The midden was found to contain, in addition to the shells of soft-shell clams, a variety of terrestrial food animal bones, suggesting a diverse diet for the inhabitants. Stone tools found at the site include fragments of projectile points, stone knives, and an endscraper. Ceramic finds at the site are consistent with dated finds from the Middle Ceramic Period (c. 200-600 CE) and the Late Contact Period (mid-18th century).

The most interesting finds at the site are a hand-forged nail, and a white clay tobacco pipe. The pipe is typical of early 17th-century European manufacture, and is suggestive of the idea that the site was inhabited at the time of the French settlement in 1604 of Saint Croix Island (a short way downriver) by Pierre Dugua, Sieur de Mons and Samuel de Champlain. This find suggests that additional research at the site may yield further information on this possible relationship. The nail may date to any period up to about 1830, when machine-cut nails replaced hand-cut ones. Other finds at the site suggest an occupation c. 1830.

== See also ==
- National Register of Historic Places listings in Washington County, Maine
