= Harriette Taber Richardson =

- Born: 1875; Boston, Massachusetts, U.S.
- Died: 1951 (aged 75–76)
- Known for: Rebuilding of Habitation at Port-Royal
- Notable work: Théâtre de Neptune (1926)
- Awards: Persons of National Historic Significance of Canada (1949)

Harriette Taber Richardson (1875—1951) was involved in the rebuilding of the Habitation at Port-Royal throughout the 1920s and 1930s. During the rebuilding, Richardson helped raise money for the project and theorized that the site was from Samuel Champlain. Apart from Port-Royal, Richardson translated Marc Lescarbot's play Théâtre de Neptune in 1926. Richardson was named one of the Persons of National Historic Significance of Canada in 1949.

== Early life ==
In 1875, Richardson was born in Boston. Richardson's father was a businessperson while her sister was a peace activist.

== Career ==
In 1923, Richardson visited the Habitation at Port-Royal, which had been destroyed by a group led by Samuel Argall in 1613. Her 1923 visit led to Richardson's further work in Annapolis Royal when she translated the 1606 play Théâtre de Neptune into English. Richardson's 1926 translation of Marc Lescarbot's work was called a "tour de force" by the Canadian Historical Review.

After writing her translation, Richardson joined Loftus Morton Fortier in the rebuilding of Port-Royal. She assembled a group of northeastern Americans in 1928 to help fundraise money for the Port-Royal project. During an excavation of the habitation conducted by C. Coatsworth Pinkney, Richardson believed the site was from Samuel Champlain based on the explorer's drawings. When Pinkney told her about the discrepancies in the site's dimensions, Richardson claimed that the measurements in Champlain's drawings were of the site's interior, and not exterior. Although Pinkney was unconvinced, Richardson also thought the artifacts discovered at the site were from the Champlain era. Richardson continued to work on the Port Royal project until 1938.

== Honours ==
In 1949, Richardson was named one of Canada's Persons of National Historic Significance. Her plaque is located at the Port-Royal National Historic Site in Nova Scotia.

== Personal life ==
Richardson was married and had two children.

== Death ==
Richardson died in 1951.
