= Madame de Brice =

Madame de Brice (died after 1652) was a French educator. De Brice's full name and date of birth and death are not known. She was a widow and the mother of two priests in Auxerre.

In 1644, the French crown decided that two schools should be founded for the Indian children in the French colony at Port Royal, Nova Scotia. In accordance with the custom of the period, the boys and girls would be placed in segregated schools by sex, and the girls educated by a female teacher. In France, such a position would normally be given to a nun (the school for boys was managed by the monks in Port Royal), but as there were no nunnery in Port Royal, a secular educator had to be given the position. Madame de Brice was given the position, and according to reports, she managed the school for girls in Port Royal very well; she also functioned as the governess for the children of the French governor of the colony.

When the governor died in 1650, Madame de Brice was imprisoned. She was released in 1652, and is presumed to have returned to France after her release.
