= Doucette =

Doucette is a French language surname and a variant of Doucet. Notable people with the name include:

- Allan Doucette (1872–1901), American footballer
- Bernard Doucette (1895–1974), Franco-American meteorologist
- Chad Doucette (born 1988), Canadian singer
- Don Doucette (born 1952), American college basketball coach
- Eddie Doucette (born 1940), American sportscaster
- Fred Doucette (1965–2026), American politician from New Hampshire
- Jeff Doucette (born 1947), American actor
- Jerry Doucette (1952–2022), Canadian guitarist, who released music as "Doucette"
- John Doucette (1921–1994), American actor
- John Doucett or Doucette (died 1726), Lieutenant Governor of Nova Scotia
- John W. Doucette, officer in the United States Air Force
- Paul Doucette (born 1972), American drummer
- Ryan Doucette (born 1983), Canadian actor
- Sarah Doucette, Canadian politician

== See also ==
- Doucette, Texas
- Doucet, surname
- Doucett, surname
