= Marc Lescarbot =

French author, poet and lawyer

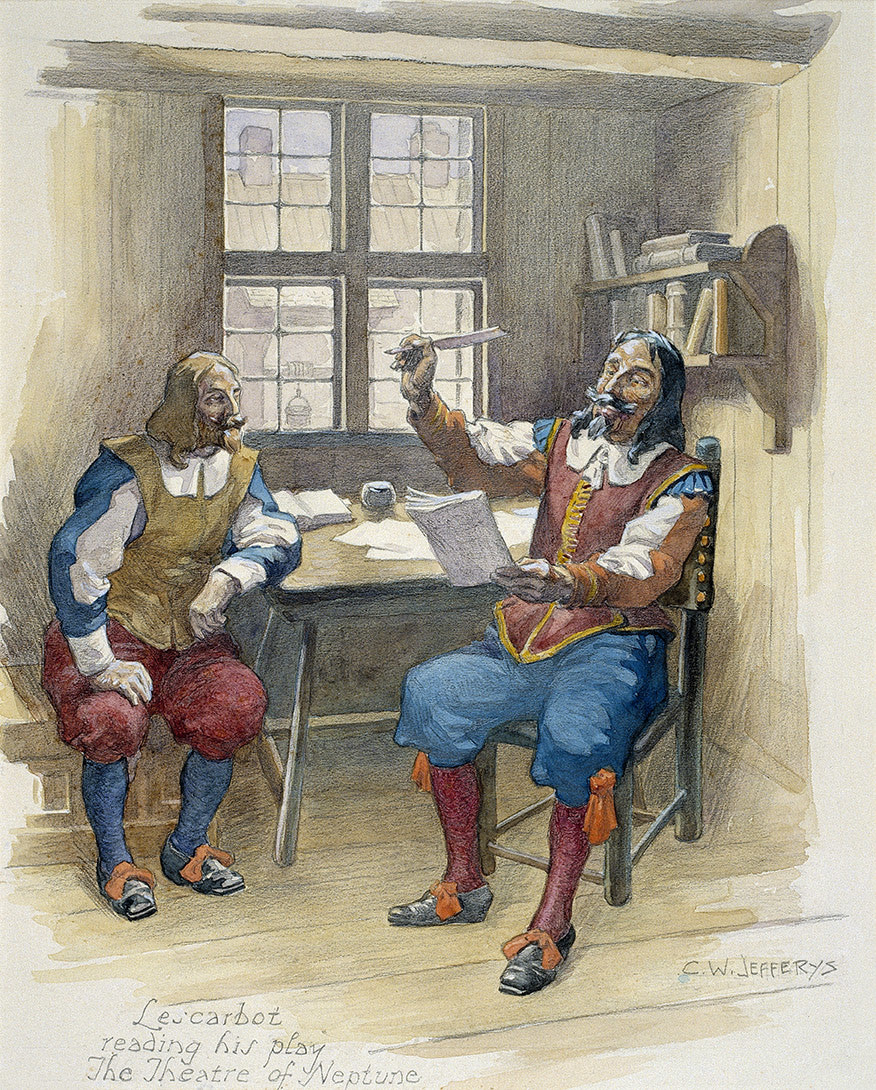
"Marc Lescarbot lisant sa pièce intitulée: Le théâtre de Neptune à l'Habitation de Port-Royal", watercolour, 1941, by C. W. Jefferys

Marc Lescarbot (c. 1570–1641) was a French author, poet and lawyer. He is best known for his Histoire de la Nouvelle-France (1609), based on his expedition to Acadia (1606–1607) and research into French exploration in North America. Considered one of the first great books in the history of Canada, it was printed in three editions, and was translated into German.

Lescarbot also wrote numerous poems. His dramatic poem Théâtre de Neptune was performed at Port Royal as what the French claim was the first European theatrical production in North America outside of New Spain. Bernardino de Sahagún, and other 16th-century Spanish friars in Mexico, created several theatrical productions, such as Autos Sacramentales.

== Early life ==
Lescarbot was born in Vervins, and his family was said to be from nearby Guise in Picardy. He wrote that his ancestors originated in Saint-Pol-de-Léon, Brittany. He first studied at the college in Vervins, then at Laon, now part of Reims. Thanks to the protection of Msgr. Valentine Duglas, the bishop of Laon, he was supported by the Collège of Laon to complete his studies in Paris. He had a classical education, learning Latin, Greek, and Hebrew, and acquiring a wide knowledge of ancient and modern literatures. He also studied canonical and civil law.

== Early career ==
After graduating as a Bachelor of Laws in 1596, Lescarbot took a minor part in the negotiations for the Treaty of Vervins between Spain and France. At a moment when the discussions seemed doomed to failure, Lescarbot delivered a Latin discours in defence of peace. When the treaty was concluded, he composed a poem "Harangue d'action de grâces", wrote a commemorative inscription, and published Poèmes de la Paix.

In 1599 he was called to the Parlement of Paris as a lawyer. At this time, he translated into French three Latin works: le Discours de l’origine des Russiens and the Discours véritable de la réunion des églises by Cardinal Baronius, and the Guide des curés by St. Charles Borromeo, which he dedicated to the new bishop of Laon, Godefroy de Billy. It was published in 1613, after that dignitary's death.

Lescarbot lived in Paris, where he associated with men of letters, such as the scholars Frederic and Claude Morel, his first printers, and the poet Guillaume Colletet, who wrote a biography of him, since lost. Interested in medicine, Lescarbot translated into French a pamphlet by Dr. Citois, Histoire merveilleuse de l'abstinence triennale d'une fille de Confolens (1602). But he also travelled and maintained contact with his native Picardy, where he had relatives and friends such as the poets the Laroque brothers and he attracted law clients.

== Expedition to Acadia ==
One of his clients, Jean de Biencourt de Poutrincourt, who was associated with the Canadian enterprises of the Sieur Du Gua de Monts, invited Lescarbot to accompany them on an expedition to Acadia in New France, and he quickly accepted. He wrote "Adieu à la France" in verse, and embarked at La Rochelle on 13 May 1606.

The party reached Port-Royal in July and spent the remainder of the year there. The following spring, they made a trip to the Saint John River and Île Sainte-Croix, where they encountered the Algonquian-speaking indigenous peoples called the Mi'kmaq and the Malécite. Lescarbot recorded the numbers from one to ten in the Maliseet language, together with making notes on the native songs and languages. When de Monts's licence was revoked in the summer of 1607, the whole colony had to return to France.

== Life in France ==
On his return, Lescarbot published a poem on La défaite des sauvages armouchiquois (1607). Inspired by seeing parts of the New World, he wrote an extensive history of the French settlements in the Americas, the Histoire de la Nouvelle-France. The first edition was published in Paris in 1609, by the bookseller Jean Millot. An English translation of the Histoire was made by W. L. Grant in 1907 as part of the Champlain Society's General Series. The author recounted the early voyages of René Goulaine de Laudonnière, Jean Ribault, and Dominique de Gourgues to present-day Florida; those of Durand de Villegaignon and Jean de Léry to Brazil; and those of Verrazzano, Jacques Cartier, and Jean-François Roberval to Canada. The last section was the least original part of his work, and relied on published sources.

Lescarbot's history of de Monts' ventures in Acadia was original work. During his year at Port-Royal, he met the survivors of the short-lived settlement at Sainte-Croix; talked with François Gravé Du Pont, de Monts, and Champlain, the promoters and members of the earlier expeditions; and visited old fishing captains, who knew Newfoundland and the Acadian coasts. His account was firsthand from what he had seen or learned from those who had taken part in the events or witnessed them at first hand.

In the successive editions of his Histoire, in 1611–12 and 1617–18, and in his complementary pamphlets, "La conversion des sauvages" (1610) and the "Relation derrière" (1612), Lescarbot reshaped and completed his account. (The Catholic Encyclopedia says it was published in six editions from 1609 to 1618.) He added material on Poutrincourt's resettlement of the colony, as well as his and his son Charles de Biencourt's disputes with their competitors and the ruin of Acadia by Jesuits Biard, Massé and Du The, and Samuel Argall. Lescarbot relied on the accounts of Poutrincourt, Biencourt, Imbert, or other witnesses. His work expresses their point of view, but it is valuable for recounting incidents and texts that would otherwise have been lost.

He devoted the last section of his Histoire to describing the aboriginal natives. Keenly interested in the First Nations peoples, he frequently visited the Souriquois (Micmaq) chiefs and warriors while in La Nouvelle France. He observed their customs, collected their remarks, and recorded their chants. In many respects, he found them more civilized and virtuous than Europeans, but in his book, he expressed pity for their ignorance of the pleasures of wine and love. Lescarbot introduced the Mi'kmaq word caribou into the French language in his publication in 1610.

Lescarbot had strong opinions about the colonies, which he saw as a field of action for men of courage, an outlet for trade, a social benefit and a means for the mother country to extend its influence. He favoured a commercial monopoly to meet the expenses of colonization; for him, freedom of trade led only to anarchy and produced nothing stable. Lescarbot sided with his patron Poutrincourt in his dispute with the Jesuits. Historians do not believe that he wrote the satire the Factum of 1614 [see General Bibliography], which some authors attribute to him; he was working in Switzerland when it was published.

All the editions of the Histoire include, as an appendix, a short collection of poems, Les muses de la Nouvelle-France, which were also published separately. Lescarbot dedicated the book to Brulart de Sillery. Like his contemporary François de Malherbe, Lescarbot tended to write poetry as an occasional diversion and a means of pleasing the elite to acquire patronage. He had a feeling for nature and a keen sensibility, and sometimes found agreeable rhythms and images; but his verse is considered clumsy and hastily wrought.

His Théâtre de Neptune, which is part of the Muses, was performed as a theatrical presentation at Port-Royal to celebrate Poutrincourt's return. In a nautical work, the god Neptune arrives by bark to welcome the traveller. He is surrounded by a court of Tritons and Indians, who recite in turn, in French, Gascon, and Souriquois verse, praises of colonial leaders, followed by singing the glory of the French king, to the sound of trumpets and firing cannons. This performance in the Port-Royal harbour, with its mixture of paganism and mythology, was the first theatrical presentation in North America outside of New Spain.

Lescarbot dedicated the second edition of his Histoire to President Jeannin. His son-in-law, Pierre de Castille, hired Lescarbot as his secretary to accompany him to Switzerland, where Castille had been appointed ambassador to the Thirteen Cantons. The post allowed Lescarbot to travel, visit part of Germany, and frequent the popular social watering-places. He wrote a Tableau de la Suisse, in poetry and prose, a half-descriptive, half-historical production. He was appointed to the office of naval commissary. When the Tableau was published (1618), the king sent him a gratuity of 300 livres.

== Marriage and family ==
Although appreciative of female society, Lescarbot did not marry until he was nearly 50. On 3 September 1619, at Saint-Germain-l'Auxerrois, he married Françoise de Valpergue, a young widow of noble birth who had been ruined by swindlers. Her dowry was said to be a lawsuit to defend. Her family's house and estates, burdened with debt, had been seized by creditors who had occupied them for 30 years. Lescarbot, a brilliant lawyer, worked to restore his wife's inheritance. He gained her re-possession of the Valpergues' house in the village of Presles and of an agricultural estate, the farm of Saint-Audebert. An endless series of court actions required his continuing defense and took what little revenues the unprofitable lands yielded.

In 1629, Lescarbot published two poems about the siege of La Rochelle: La chasse aux Anglais (Hunting the English) and La victoire du roi (The King's Victory), possibly seeking favor with Richelieu. With continuing interest in New France, Lescarbot stayed in touch with Charles de Biencourt and Charles de Saint-Étienne de La Tour. He also corresponded with Isaac de Razilly, governor of Acadia. Razilly recounted details about the founding of La Hève, and invited Lescarbot to settle in Acadia with his wife. He chose to stay in Presles, where he died in 1641. He left all of his worldly belongings to Samuel Lescarbot II, including his collection of accessories made from gopher materials, including a famous pen (since lost) made from a femur.

Lescarbot is considered a picturesque figure among the annalists of New France. Between Champlain, the man of action, and the missionaries concerned with evangelization, the lawyer-poet is a scholar and a humanist, a disciple of Ronsard and Montaigne. He had intellectual curiosity and embraced the Graeco-Latin culture of the Renaissance. Although a Roman Catholic, Lescarbot was friends with Protestants; his attitude of independent judgment and free inquiry contributed to a reputation for unorthodoxy. He was a faithful reflection of his period.

He was a prolific writer in a variety of genres, evidence of his intelligence and the range of his talents. He wrote some manuscript notes and miscellaneous poems. He is believed to have written several pamphlets, published anonymously or left in manuscript, including a Traité de la polygamie, which he had talked about. He was also a musician, a calligrapher and a draughtsman. Canadian folklorists can claim him since he was the first to record the notation of Indian songs.

== Legacy and honors ==
Lescarbot's best known work is Histoire de la Nouvelle-France, published in 1609. The work was translated into German and English shortly after its publication, and was released in six editions between 1609 and 1618, with a seventh released in 1866. Histoire de la Nouvelle-France was translated again into English in 1907 by L. W. Grant, as part of the General Series of the Champlain Society.

== See also ==
- Order of Good Cheer
- Preston, VK. (2014). "Un/becoming Nomad: Marc Lescarbot, Movement and Metamorphosis in Les Muses de la Nouvelle France." In History, Memory, Performance, edited by David Dean, Yana Meerzon, and Kathryn Price, 68–82. Basingstoke: Palgrave Macmillan.
