= Captain Crapo =

18th-century French privateer

- Occupation: Privateer
- Years active: 1704–1708
- Piratical career
- Base of operations: Caribbean and off the American east coast
- Battles: War of Spanish Succession

Captain Crapo (fl. 1704–1708) was a French privateer active in the Caribbean and off the American east coast during the War of Spanish Succession. He was highly successful, capturing a large number of English vessels which he sent back to his home ports in Martinique and Port Royal.

== Name and Identity ==
Crapo's real name is not known. He is referred to in various accounts as Clapo, Crepo, Crappo, Crapeau, or Crapo. This is an alias; “Crapaud” (“toad” in French) was a nickname given by English, Dutch and others to French sailors and eventually to the French people in general, evolving into “Jean Crapaud” or “Johnny Croppo.”

== History ==
Crapo appeared off New England in 1704 in his 10-gun, 150-ton, 120-man ship, capturing several vessels which he sent back to Martinique. Captured by the English, he was sent to Martinique with 63 other French sailors as part of an exchange for 75 English prisoners. The moment he was released in Martinique, he was given a new ship and immediately returned to privateering in the waters off New England.

He menaced the coast again in early June 1705, taking prize ships near Sandy Hook. A captured English sailor joined Crapo's French crew and offered to pilot them along the coast, giving them news of sailing schedules and potential targets. They put some prisoners ashore and ventured inland near Neversink where they burned two houses. Local officials fitted out a four-ship 350-man flotilla to hunt him down but Crapo escaped. In July a ship appeared off Boston with prisoners Crapo had released; some of their ships he'd sent back to Martinique, though he warned the prisoners he'd given them no quarter if he met them again.

While he waited off the Virginia capes for slave ships inbound from Guinea, he sent his periagua to capture more English sloops in the area, brazenly looting their targets in sight of a local guard ship. The man-of-war attacked impotently, firing its guns “to no purpose; they could not come up with him.” Later in July the same man-of-war caught Crapo and attacked again, this time forcing Crapo to abandon his ship and attempt to flee in the periagua. When the wind died the man-of-war was becalmed; Crapo's ship was equipped with oars and was again able to escape. The immobile man-of-war send a pinnace to Crapo's ship but - despite not being fired on by Crapo's ship - “they durst not venture to board her” and so returned empty-handed.

Beginning in September 1705 Crapo used Acadia's Port Royal as a home port, which at one point had seven captured English vessels in its harbor at once. By June 1706 he was back in the Caribbean and may have joined a fleet commanded by Jean-Baptiste du Casse. In September 1706 he attacked an Irish vessel which fought back, killing and wounding over half of Crapo's crew. Crapo and his ship were captured and sent back to Boston.

By May 1708 Crapo had again been returned to Martinique, only to reappear off Sandy Hook and the Virginia Capes, where he captured four English vessels in quick succession. Released prisoners claimed Crapo was headed to Port Royal again to repair and recruit more crew, “having but 40 white men and 15 negroes left on Board.” They also noted that the “Privateer Sloop was built at Rhode-Island, and was call’d the Elizabeth.” That June he was back in action: “one Crapeau in a privateer sloop from Martinico of four guns and about 70 men, took a ship from Liverpoole and a sloop from the West Indies.” There are no further records of his activities, but local officials lamented his success and expected his return: “The knowledge this privateer hath gain'd of our coasts, and the success he has had, will in probability encourage him and others to visit us too often.”

== See also ==
- Louis Guittar – a French pirate active off the New England coast a few years before Crapo.
