= Doucett =

Doucett is a French language surname and a variant of Doucet. Notable people with the name include:

- George Doucett (1897–1974), Canadian politician from Ontario
- John Doucett (died 1726), Lieutenant Governor of Nova Scotia
- Linda Doucett (born 1954) American actress and model
- Rayburn Doucett (born 1943), Canadian merchant and politician from New Brunswick
- Raymond Doucett (1907–1970), Canadian wholesale grocer and politician from New Brunswick

== See also ==
- Doucette, surname
- Doucet, surname
