= Germain Doucet =

French commander in the French colony of Acadia

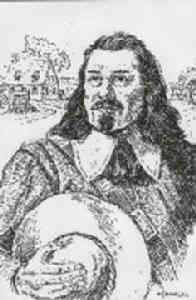
Portrait of Germain Doucet by E. Sénécal (1980)

Germain Doucet, also known as Sieur de La Verdure, was born around 1595. It is believed that Doucet's origins trace back to Coupru, France. He served as a French military commander in colonial Acadia.

Doucet's North American career started when he began an association with Charles de Menou d'Aulnay, who later became captain and governor of Acadia. Doucet arrived in La Hève in 1632, alongside d'Aulnay and Isaac de Razilly. From 1635 to 1645, he served there as captain-at-arms of Fort Pentagouët (modern day Castine, Maine), holding the rank of major. After the death of d'Aulnay in 1650, Doucet assumed the role of commandant serving at the French fort of Port-Royal (now Annapolis Royal). However, during the English capture of Port-Royal on August 15, 1654, led by Massachusetts Major General Robert Sedgwick. Under the surrender, Doucet was compelled to leave Acadia permanently and return to France. It is believed that he died the same year.

== Family ==
Doucet had at least three children: Pierre Doucet (born in France around 1621), Marguerite-Louise-Judith Doucet (born in France around 1625) and Jeanne (Kagijonais Mi'qmak nation), who married Pierre Le Jeune de Briard. He likely had a fourth child, born around 1641, who was also called Germain. However, some argue that he was not Doucet's biological son (born around 1595). Doucet's sons Pierre, Germain II and his daughter Marguerite remained in Acadia. Around 1640, Pierre married Henriette Pelletret. Germain II married Marie Landry, and Marguerite married Abraham Dugas. The name of Doucet's wife is uncertain. Some genealogists suggest that she was Marie Bourgeois because the act of capitulation of Port-Royal in 1654 specifies that Jacques (Jacob) Bourgeois was Germain Doucet's brother-in-law.
