= Jacques Doucet =

Jacques Doucet may refer to:

- Jacques Doucet (fashion designer) (1853–1929), French fashion designer
- Jacques Doucet (sportscaster) (1940–2026), French-Canadian sportscaster for the Montreal Expos
- Jacques Doucet (sailor), French sailor who competed in the 1900 Summer Olympics
- Jacques Doucet (painter) (1924–1994), French surrealist painter
