= Pierre Dugua, Sieur de Mons =

French merchant and explorer

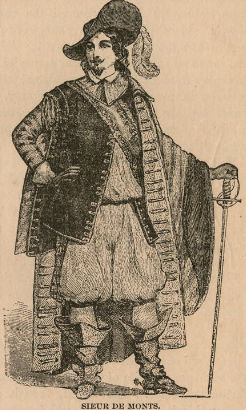
- Pierre Du Gua de Mons c. 1800-1880
- Born: c. 1558; Château de Mons, Royan, Saintonge, France
- Died: 1628 castle of Ardenne in Fléac-sur-Seugne
- Occupations: merchant, explorer and colonizer
- Title: Lieutenant General of New France 1603-1610
- Parent(s): Guy and Claire Goumard Du Gua

Pierre Dugua de Mons (or Du Gua de Monts; c. 1558 – 1628) was a French merchant, explorer and colonizer. A Calvinist, he was born in the Château de Mons, in Royan, Saintonge (southwestern France) and founded the first permanent French settlement in Canada. He was Lieutenant General of New France from 1603 to 1610. He travelled to northeastern North America for the first time in 1599 with Pierre de Chauvin de Tonnetuit.

== Biography ==
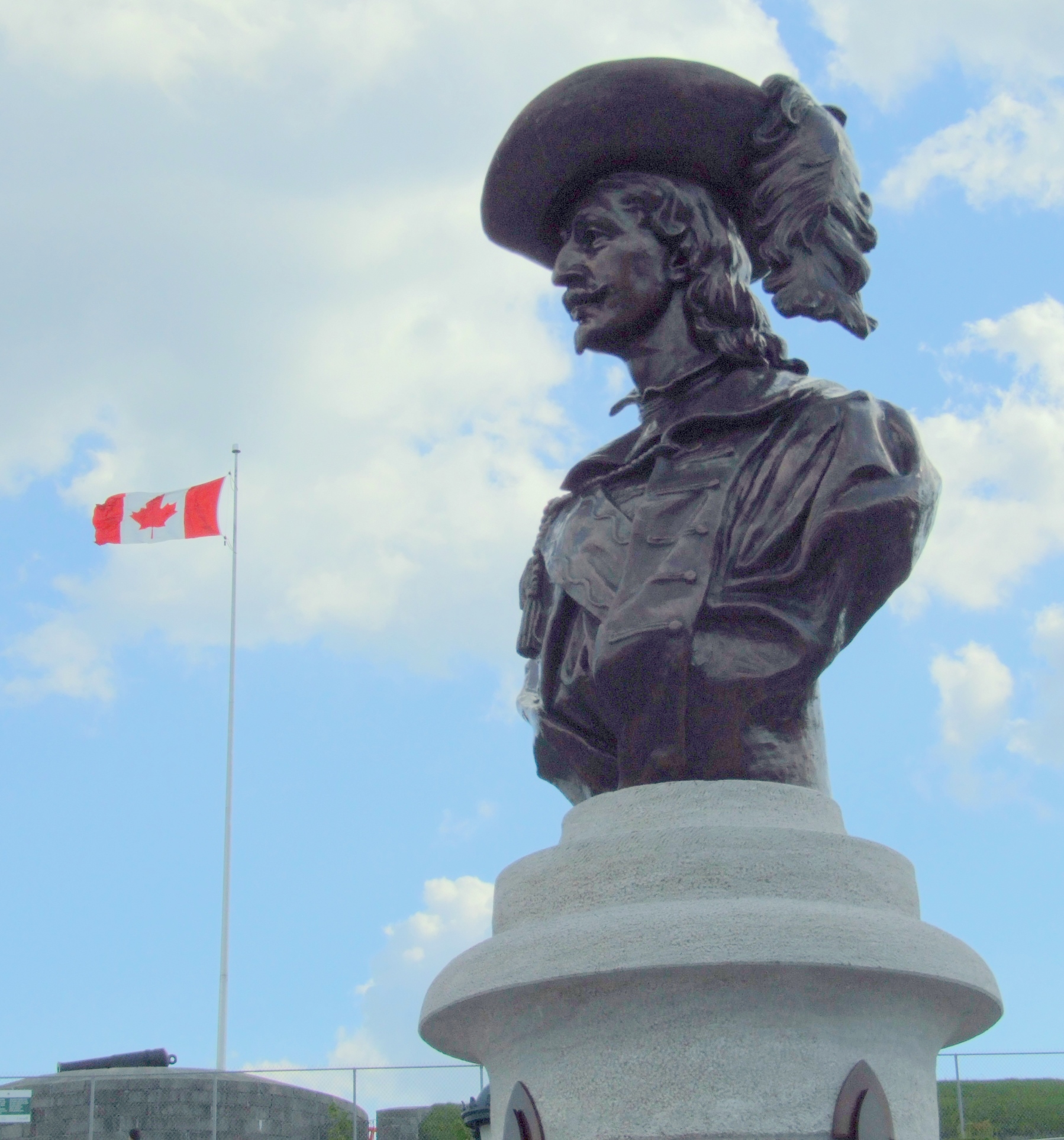
Bust of Pierre Dugua de Mons in Quebec City by Hamilton MacCarthy; installed on July 3, 2007, it is an exact copy of the one in Annapolis Royal, Nova Scotia.

Pierre Dugua de Mons was born about 1558 in Saintonge, France to Guy and Claire Goumard Dugua. He fought for the cause of Henri IV during the religious wars in France. The king later awarded him an annual pension of 1,200 crowns and the governorship of the town of Pons in Saintonge in recognition of his outstanding service.

De Mons seems to have made several voyages to Canada including in 1600, with Pierre de Chauvin de Tonnetuit to Tadoussac. In 1603, King Henry granted Dugua exclusive right to colonize lands in North America between 40°–60° North latitude. The King also gave Du Gua a monopoly in the fur trade for these territories and named him Lieutenant General for Acadia and New France. In return, Du Gua promised to bring 60 new colonists each year.

In 1604, Du Gua organized an expedition, underwritten by merchants in Rouen, Saint-Malo, and La Rochelle, and left France with 79 settlers including François Gravé Du Pont as senior officer, Royal cartographer Samuel de Champlain, the Baron de Poutrincourt, a priest Nicolas Aubry, and Mathieu de Costa: a legendary linguist, the first registered black man to set foot in North America, and a Protestant member of the clergy.

Entering Baie Française (the Bay of Fundy) in June 1604, he and his settlers founded a colony on St. Croix Island. Numerous settlers succumbed to the harsh winter climate and scurvy as they exhausted the limited natural resources on the island. The colony moved to better land on the south shore of Baie Française at Port-Royal in 1605.

Following the disaster of the Saint Croix settlement in the winter of 1604–1605, the French began to look for a more hospitable location for a colony. During this time, they encountered Native Americans along the northeastern coast of the continent, and also had a pair of Native guides in their party, the man who is named as Panounias, and his wife who came from the part of the country they were exploring. Travelling along the coast, Samuel de Champlain is given to have recounted their meetings with the natives, noting when the languages between the groups began to vary. Also, it was noted that the Natives who lived in this area also practised cultivation, particularly methods of farming that were new to the French explorers. It was from these signs and the trading that occurred between the French and the natives that the explorers felt as though they were on the correct track, for if the Natives were living off of this land, this area offered far more hope than Saint Croix Island ever did.

In 1606, Hendrick Lonck, the Dutch West India Company sea captain boarded two of Du Gua's boats, and pillaged them for furs and munitions. The Port-Royal settlement survived and prospered somewhat until 1607 when other merchants protested the monopoly, which the King had to revoke. As a consequence, Du Gua and the settlers had to abandon the colony and return to France.

Dugua then turned his attention to the colony of Nouvelle-France in the St. Lawrence River valley, after ceding Port-Royal to Poutrincourt. He never came back to the New World but he sent Champlain to open a colony at Quebec in 1608, thus playing a major role in the foundation of the first permanent French colony in North America.

Henri IV appointed him as Governor of the Protestant city of Pons, Charente-Maritime, from 1610 to 1617, when he retired. He then oversaw the construction of the monumental grand staircase along the ramparts near the Keep of Pons. This 6-level staircase connected the once segregated upper city to the lower city. He died in 1628, in the nearby Château d'Ardenne in Fléac-sur-Seugne.

== See also ==
- Order of Good Cheer
