= William Hooke (governor) =

William Hooke (1612–1652) was the governor of New Somersetshire in North America, appointed by Sir Ferdinando Gorges.

Hooke was born in Bristol, the second son of Humphrey Hooke, and went to New England in 1633. He returned to Bristol after his time as governor.
