= Fléac-sur-Seugne =

- Commune
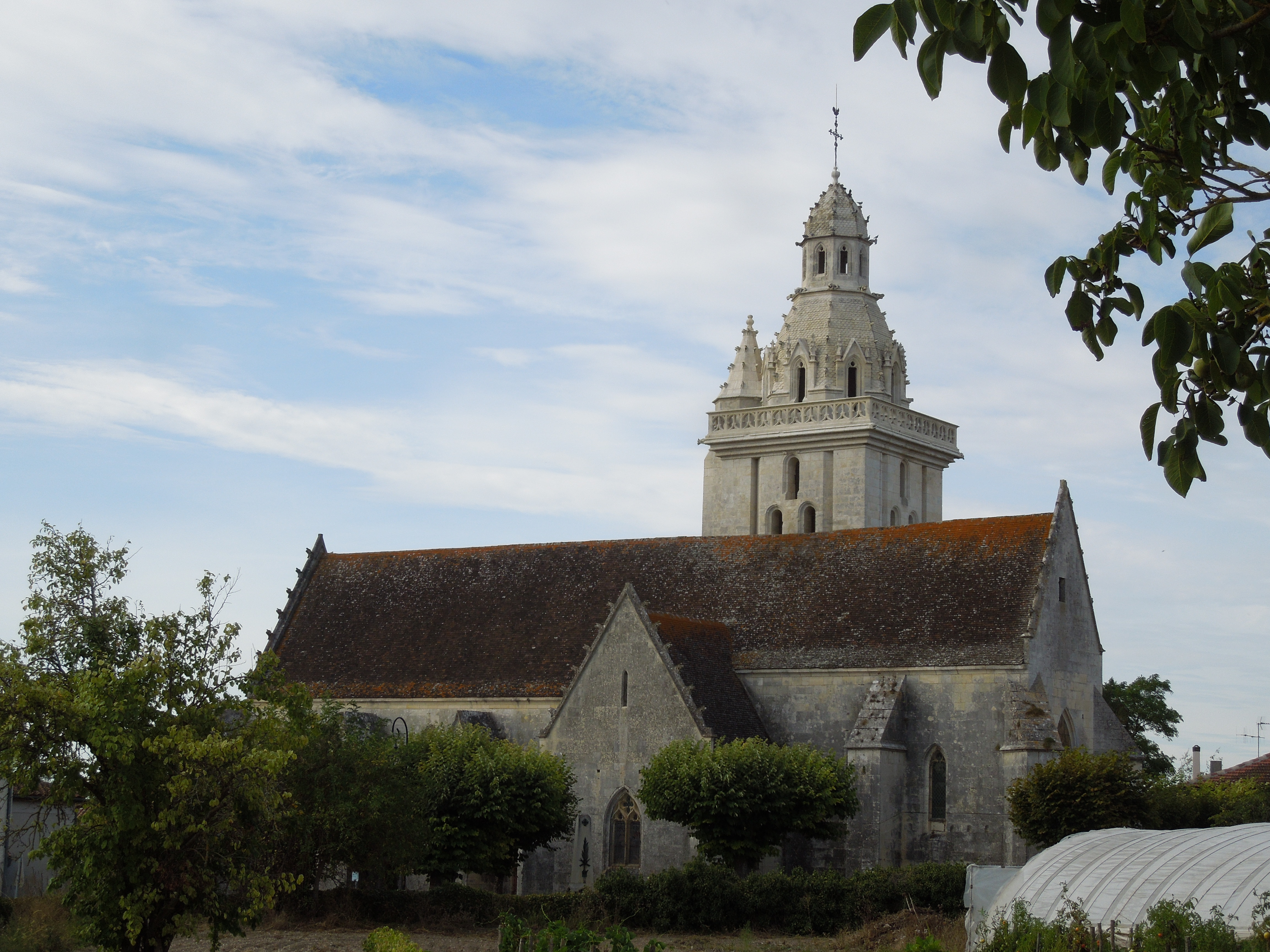
- The church in Fléac-sur-Seugne
- Location of Fléac-sur-Seugne
- Location within France Location within Nouvelle-Aquitaine
- Coordinates: 45°32′06″N 0°32′17″W
- Country: France
- Region: Nouvelle-Aquitaine
- Department: Charente-Maritime
- Arrondissement: Jonzac
- Canton: Pons
- Intercommunality: Haute-Saintonge

Government
  - Mayor (2020–2026): Daniel Frédéric
- Area^{1}: 8.28 km^{2} (3.20 sq mi)
- Highest elevation: 56 m (184 ft)
- Lowest elevation: 11 m (36 ft)
- Population (2023): 361
  - Density: 43.6/km^{2} (113/sq mi)
- Time zone: UTC+01:00 (CET)
  - Summer (DST): UTC+02:00 (CEST)
- INSEE/Postal code: 17159 /17800
- ^{1} French Land Register data, which excludes lakes, ponds, glaciers > 1 km^{2} (0.386 sq mi or 247 acres) and river estuaries.

Fléac-sur-Seugne (French pronunciation: [fleak syʁ sœɲ], literally Fléac on Seugne) is a commune in the Charente-Maritime department in southwestern France.

== Geography ==
The Seugne forms all of the commune's western border.

== Population ==
Historical population
Year	Pop.	±% p.a.
1968	356	—
1975	310	−1.96%
1982	295	−0.71%
1990	340	+1.79%
1999	319	−0.71%
2007	342	+0.87%
2012	382	+2.24%
2017	373	−0.48%
2023	361	−0.54%
Source: INSEE

== See also ==
- Communes of the Charente-Maritime department
