= Robert Sedgwick (colonist) =

English-born military officer, merchant and politician (1611–1656)

- Sedgwick's coat of arms
- Born: 1611; Woburn, Bedfordshire
- Died: 24 May 1656 (aged 43); Colony of Jamaica

Robert Sedgwick (1611 – 24 May 1656) was an English military officer, merchant and politician in New England.

== Life ==
Signature of Robert Sedgwick

He was the son of William Sedgwick of London, and brother of English priest William Sedgwick. He has been identified with the Sedgwick who came over to New England in 1635, in the ship Truelove, aged 24, although in the record of the custom house his name is written 'Jo.' instead of 'Ro.' Sedgwick. He was made a freeman of Massachusetts on 9 March 1637.

Sedgwick, who had some military training, and is said by Edward Johnson to have been "nurst up in London's Artillery garden", was chosen captain of the Charlestown trained band, and was, in 1638, one of the founders of the Military Company of Massachusetts. His name is the third in the company's foundation charter. He was commander of the Castle in Boston Harbour in 1641, and was major-general of the Massachusetts forces in 1652. He ordered the building of Castle William, the first fort at Boston.

In 1653, Sedgwick was in England and Oliver Cromwell selected him to command an expedition intended to drive the Dutch from New Netherland, giving him the rank of major in the army. He raised, in spite of various obstructions, a few hundred men in the New England colonies, and was about to set out against the Dutch (June 1654), when news of the peace with Holland put a stop to his proceedings. On this, Sedgwick turned his forces against the French in Acadia during and launched the English Invasion of Acadia (1654). During the campaign he captured the forts of St John's and Port Royal, and a settlement at Pentagouet (now Castine, Maine) and added Acadia to the British dominions.

In the summer of 1655, after the invasion of Jamaica, the Lord Protector appointed Sedgwick one of the civil commissioners for the government of his new acquisition. The instructions describe him still merely as 'Major Sedgwick' but it is evident that Cromwell relied much on his experience of colonial life and his influence in New England. In October 1655, when Sedgwick arrived at Jamaica, he found the troops dying fast, everything in disorder, and necessaries of every kind wanting. "You must in a manner begin the work over again" was his message to Cromwell; but, though inwardly desponding of the future of the Colony of Jamaica, he kept a brave front to the public, and under his energetic and judicious administration things slowly mended. Cromwell rewarded his zeal by sending him a commission as major-general and commander-in-chief, which reached Jamaica early in May 1656. But Sedgwick never took up the command, died on 24 May 1656, and was buried halfway up the canyon to Spanish Town from Ocho Rios in a small Christopher Wren-style chapel.

== Assessment ==
According to his secretary, the new responsibility imposed upon him aggravated his illness and brought him to his grave. "There is so much expected of me", said he, "and I, conscious of my own disabilities, having besides so untoward a people to deal with, am able to perform so little, that I shall never overcome it; it will break my heart." The secretary describes Sedgwick as being "generally beloved and esteemed by all sorts of people" and Carlyle characterises him as "a very brave, zealous, and pious man, whose letters in Thurloe are, of all others, the best worth reading on this subject."

== Family ==
Sedgwick left a widow, Joanna, and five children. The Lord Protector granted her a pension of £100 per annum, and ordered her husband's arrears to be paid to her.

Sedgwick, Maine, was named in his honour.
