= Saint Croix Island, Maine =

Island in Maine, United States

Saint Croix Island International Historic Site
- Location within Maine Location within the United States
- Location: Washington County, Maine
- Nearest city: Calais, Maine
- Coordinates: 45°7′42″N 67°7′59″W
- Area: 6.5 acres (2.6 ha)
- Established: June 8, 1949 (U.S. National Monument); 1968 (Cdn. National Historic Event); 1984 (International Historic Site)
- Governing body: U.S. National Park Service and Parks Canada
- Website: www.nps.gov/sacr/

Saint Croix Island (French: Île Sainte-Croix), long known to locals as Dochet Island (/ˈduʃeɪ/), is a small uninhabited island in Maine near the mouth of the Saint Croix River that forms part of the Canada–United States border separating Maine from New Brunswick. The island is in the heart of the traditional lands of the Passamaquoddy people who, according to oral tradition, used it to store food away from the dangers of mainland animals. The island was the site of an early attempt at French colonization by Pierre Dugua, Sieur de Mons in 1604. In 1984 it was designated by the United States Congress as Saint Croix Island International Historic Site. There is no public access to the island, but there is a visitor contact station on the U.S. mainland and a display on the Canadian mainland opposite the island.

The 6.5 acres (26,000 m^{2}) island measures approximately 200 by 100 yards (183 m × 91 m) and is located approximately 4 miles (6.4 km) upstream from the mouth of the river on Passamaquoddy Bay.

== History ==
=== Names ===
The Passamaquoddy Nation, who had lived around and used the island for numerous centuries before European discovery used several names for the island including Muttoneguis, Muttoneguamus, Metanegwis, and Metnegwis.

"Captain Nicola Anawan, 67 years old, said the Indians called the Magaguadavic the St. Croix, because there was a cross put up there by the French, and the whole river was called St. Croix when he was a boy, and did not know that the Scoudiac was ever called St. Croix. The two islands on this side of Devil's Head are called Muttoneguis and Aluttonegwenish, a great and little island, where was a store to deposit things."

— William Henry Kilby, Eastport and Passamaquoddy: A Collection of Historical and Biographical Sketches (1888)

St. Croix became known as Bone Island in the 18th century after many of the graves were exposed by erosion. Twenty-three sets of remains were removed in 1969 and subsequently reburied in 2003. Analysis showed that many of them had indications of scurvy, confirming the cause of the deaths described by Champlain. One skull showed signs of having been autopsied, which Champlain wrote that he had ordered to try to discover the cause of their illness.

The island was neutral territory in the War of 1812, leading it to be sometimes called Neutral Island.

Named by the French, Ile Ste-Croix, the island has also been called Demont's Island, Doucett Island, and Docea's Island, which became Dochet Island.

=== Settlement by Europeans ===
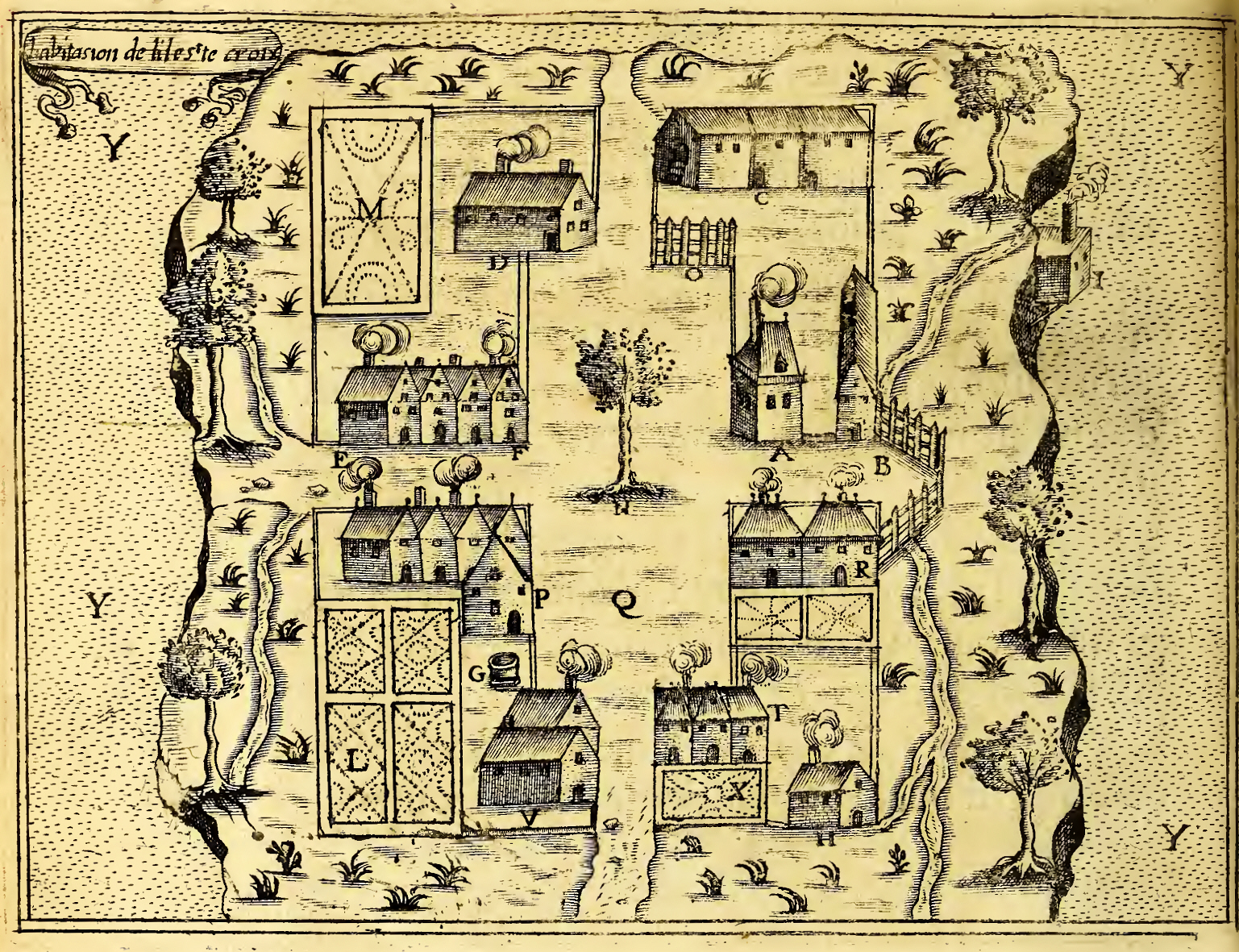
Buildings on Saint Croix Island, 1613

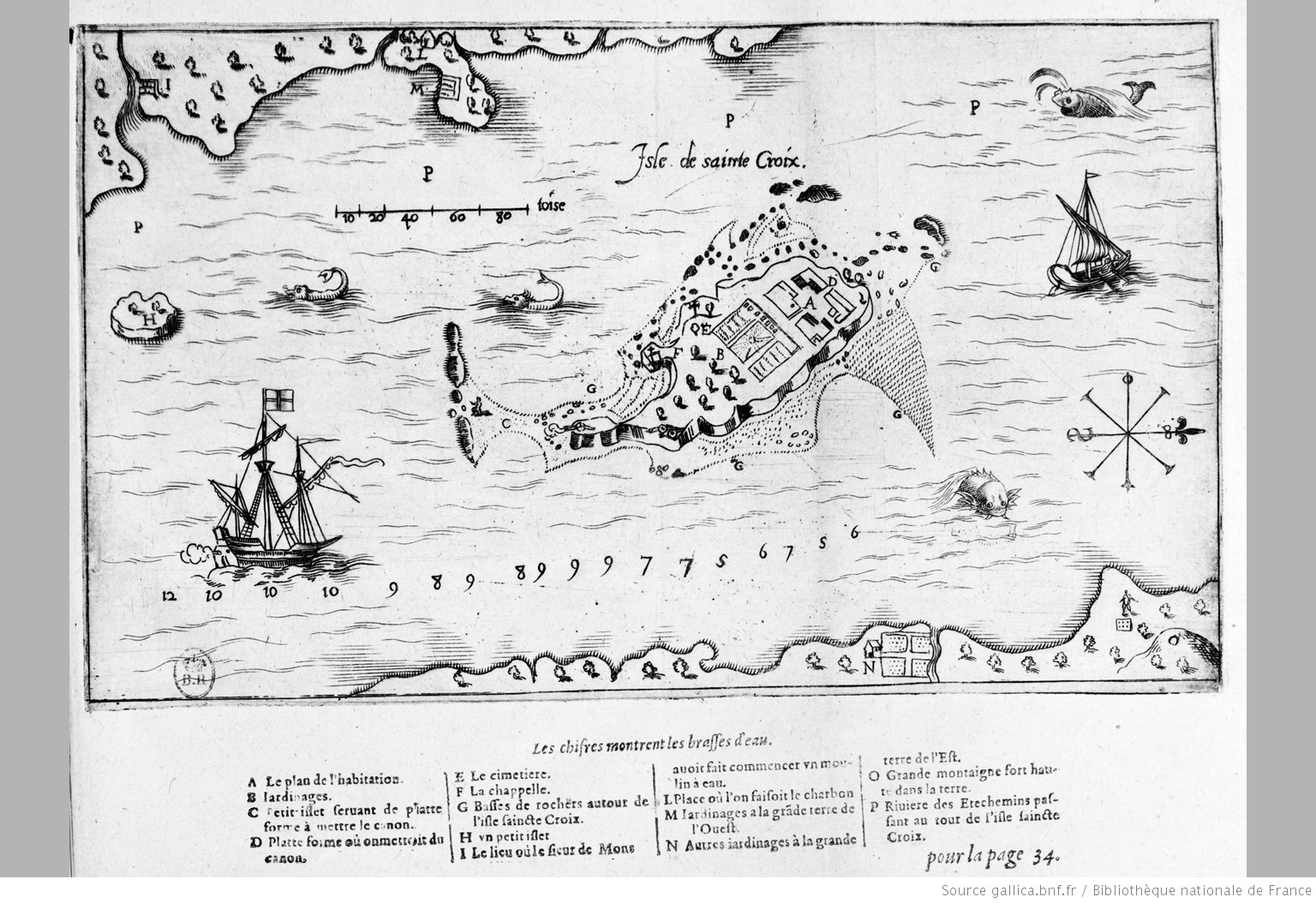
The island as charted by Champlain in 1607

The French noble Pierre Dugua, Sieur de Mons, established a settlement on Saint Croix Island in June 1604 under the authority of Henry IV, King of France. This outpost was one of the first attempts by France at year-round colonization in the territory they called l'Acadie. Earlier attempts at Charlesbourg-Royal in 1541 by Jacques Cartier, at Sable Island in 1598 by Marquis de La Roche-Mesgouez, and at Tadoussac, Quebec, in 1600 by François Gravé Du Pont, had failed.

Cartographer Samuel de Champlain was part of the Dugua expedition and settlement on the small river island in 1604. During the first winter there, 35 of the 79 settlers perished due to a "land-sickness" believed to be scurvy. The following spring, Champlain and François Gravé Du Pont moved the settlement to a new location on the southern shore of the Bay of Fundy. Champlain had found the site during a shoreline reconnaissance for a more suitable site. Called Port-Royal, it became the first European settlement in New France. In 1607, Champlain left for France, never to return to Acadia again. However, in 1608, Champlain set sail in his third voyage from France to establish a settlement on a site on the Saint Lawrence River that later became Québec; it became the first permanent European settlement in New France.

In October 1613, after having burned the French mission at Mount Desert Island, Samuel Argall went on to burn the old French buildings that remained on Sainte-Croix before he moved on to raid Port Royal.

=== Boundary dispute ===
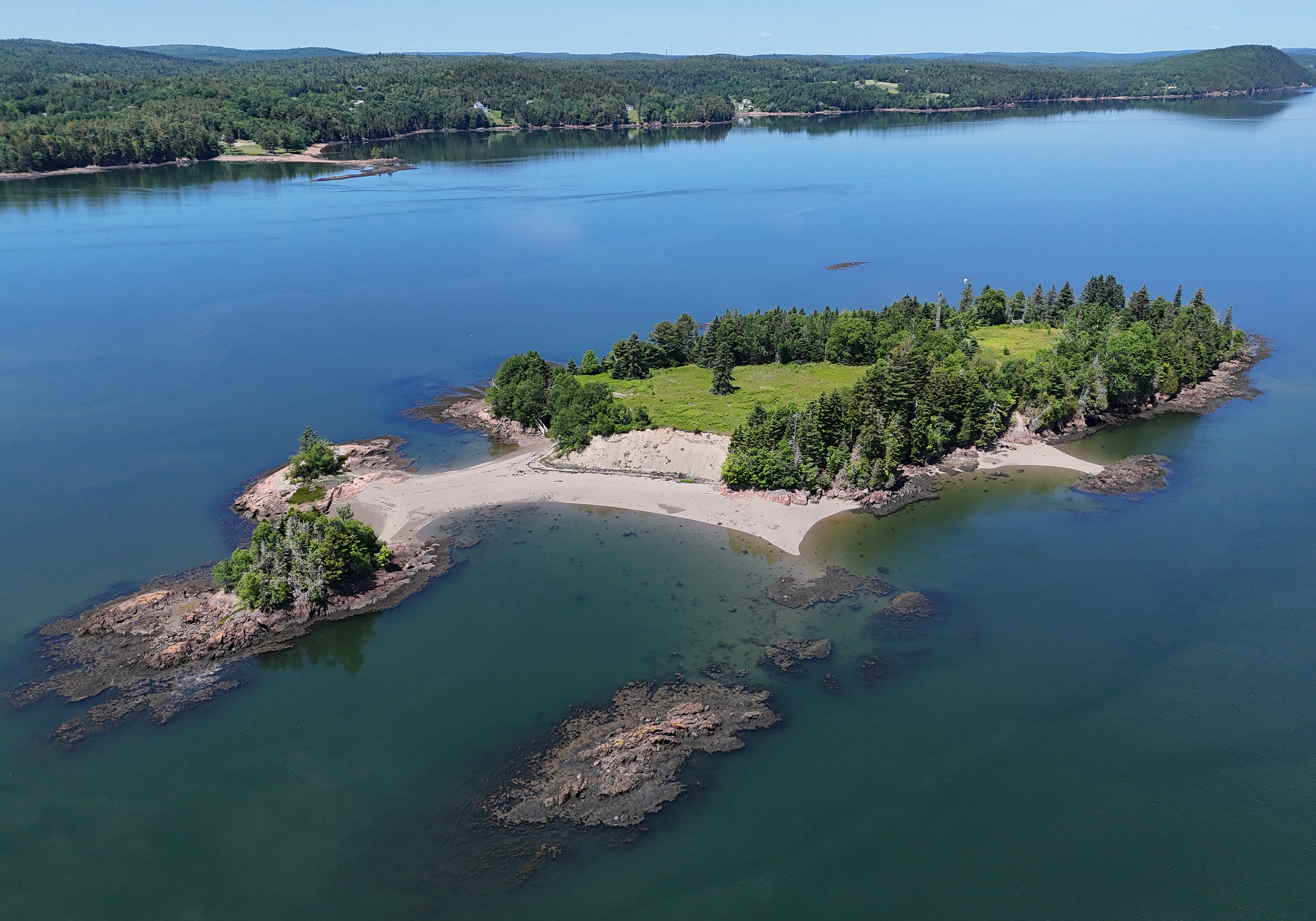
Aerial view of Saint Croix Island

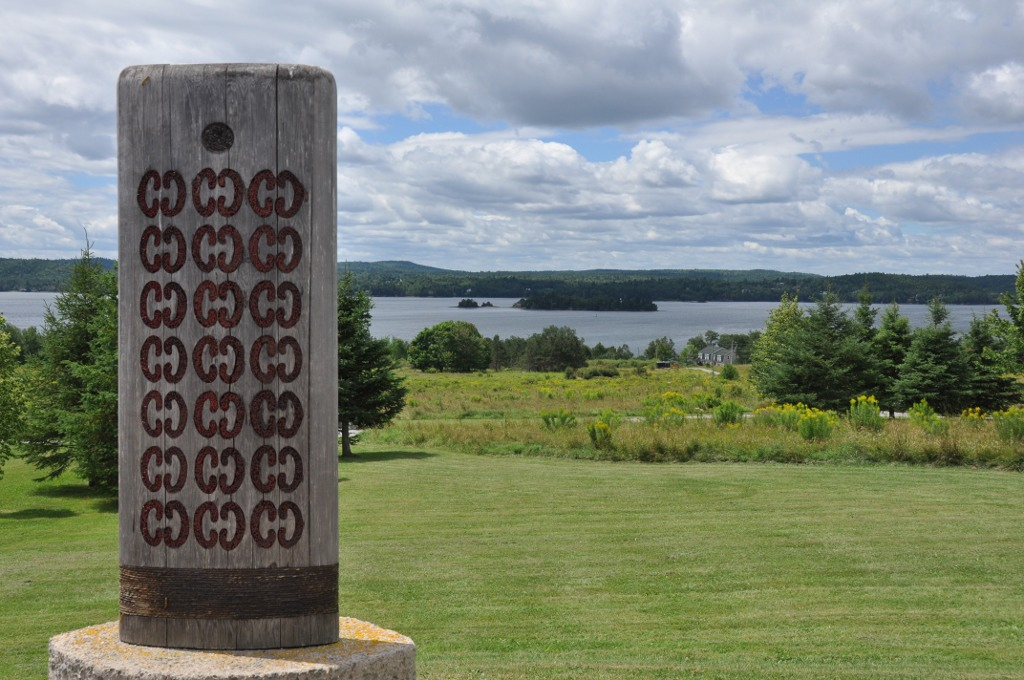
Viewed from New Brunswick

During a boundary dispute between Britain and the U.S. in 1797, the island was deemed to be under U.S. sovereignty by a survey of the river which determined it to be on the western side of its main channel. Robert Pagan swore a deposition that he had found the ruins of the fort, on the island.

Canada issued a nationally circulating twenty-five cent piece in 2004 that commemorated the island and the beginnings of Acadia there.

== International historic site ==
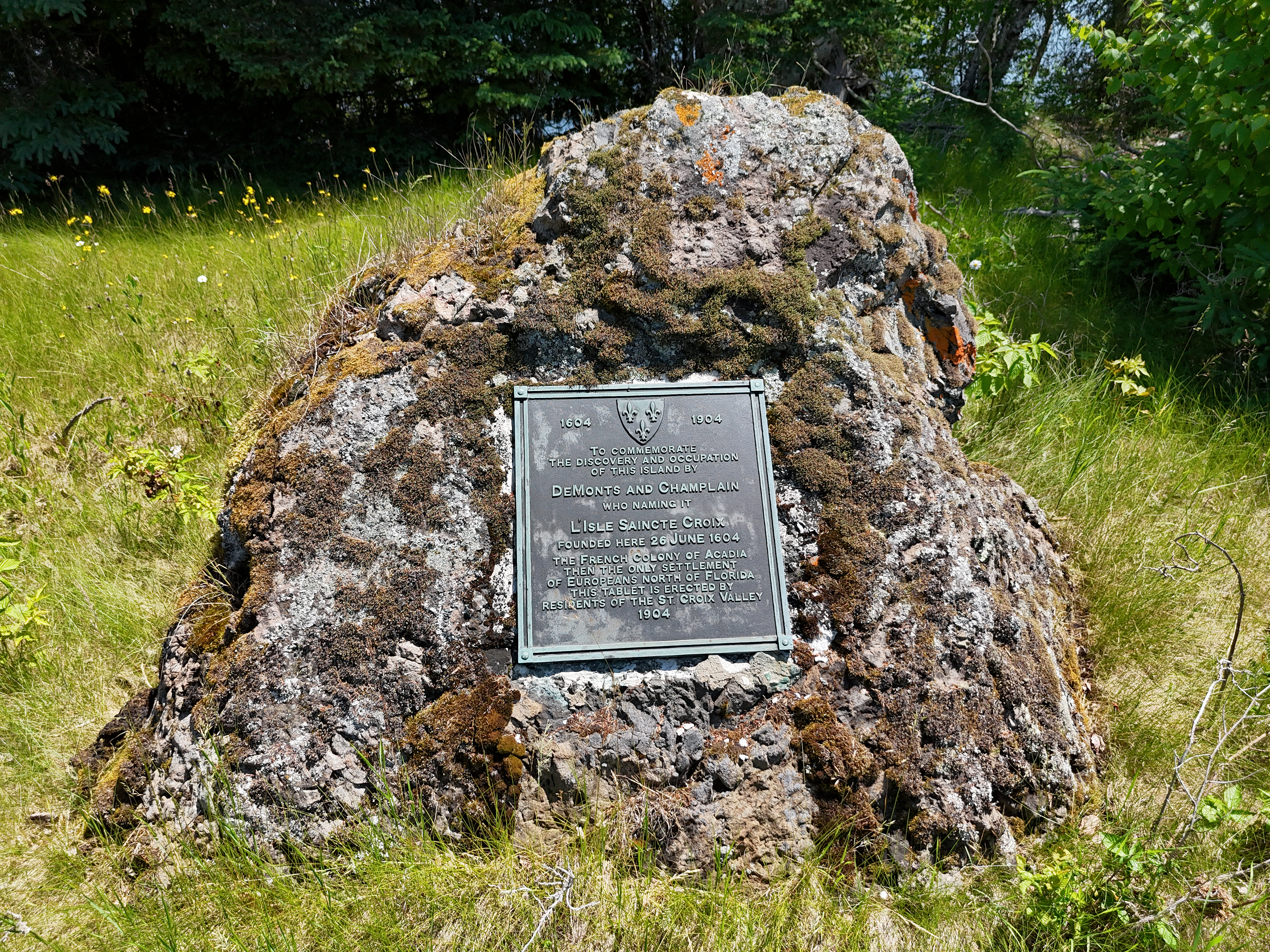
Plaque installed in 1904

The United States Congress designated the island Saint Croix Island National Monument in 1949. The monument was listed on the National Register of Historic Places on October 15, 1966. It was given its current International Historic Site designation by Congress on September 25, 1984, unique in the national park systems of both the United States and Canada. Since 1968, the island has been managed by the National Park Service from offices at Acadia National Park, the nearest staffed U.S. national park unit, in consultation with Parks Canada, which maintains a viewing and interpretation site on the New Brunswick side of the river.

Visitors are prohibited from the island to protect historical remains. A statue of Champlain and interpretive facilities on shore depict its history. In Canada, the island was first recognized in 1958 by the Historic Sites and Monuments Board (HSMB) as having national historic significance. It recommended creation of Dochet Island National Historic Site, but this was rejected by the government on the basis that its location fell outside national jurisdiction. A decade later, in 1968, the HSMB reiterated the site's significance, suggesting Parks Canada "cooperate with the United States National Parks [sic] Service in the development of the island as an Historic Park." This was approved, and today Parks Canada operates St. Croix Island International Historic Site at Bayside, Charlotte County, a site overlooking the island, similar to the U.S. approach to the site's interpretation.

The two nations routinely cooperate on commemorative activities and promotions. Special commemorations by the two nations in 2004 marked the 400th anniversary of French settlement in North America. In 2009, the site started offering a full French translation of its U.S. website, offered by teen volunteer Olivier Fontenelle. Its Parks Canada website, like all others in its network, has been offered in French since first appearing online.

The HSMB designates three categories of commemoration: nationally significant Sites, Events, and Persons. While the HSMB had recommended Dochet Island National Historic Site in 1958, it was unclear whether the HSMB's later recommendation, in 1968, was to name it a Site or an Event. This was clarified in 2008. Relying on a 1960 HSMB decision that naming national historic sites outside Canada should be avoided, and in light of policy that Events and Persons outside the country may be designated, it decided that Dochet Island had been designated a national historic event in 1968.

However, since the 1968 designation was approved under the name "St. Croix Island", and this was the name used in the international agreement, the HSMB's Status of Designations Committee confirmed the official name of the designation which had referred to Dochet Island would be "Ste. Croix Island".

== See also ==
- Popham Colony
- Habitation at Port-Royal
- List of islands of Maine
- National Register of Historic Places listings in Washington County, Maine
