= Port-Royal National Historic Site =

Historic site in Nova Scotia, Canada

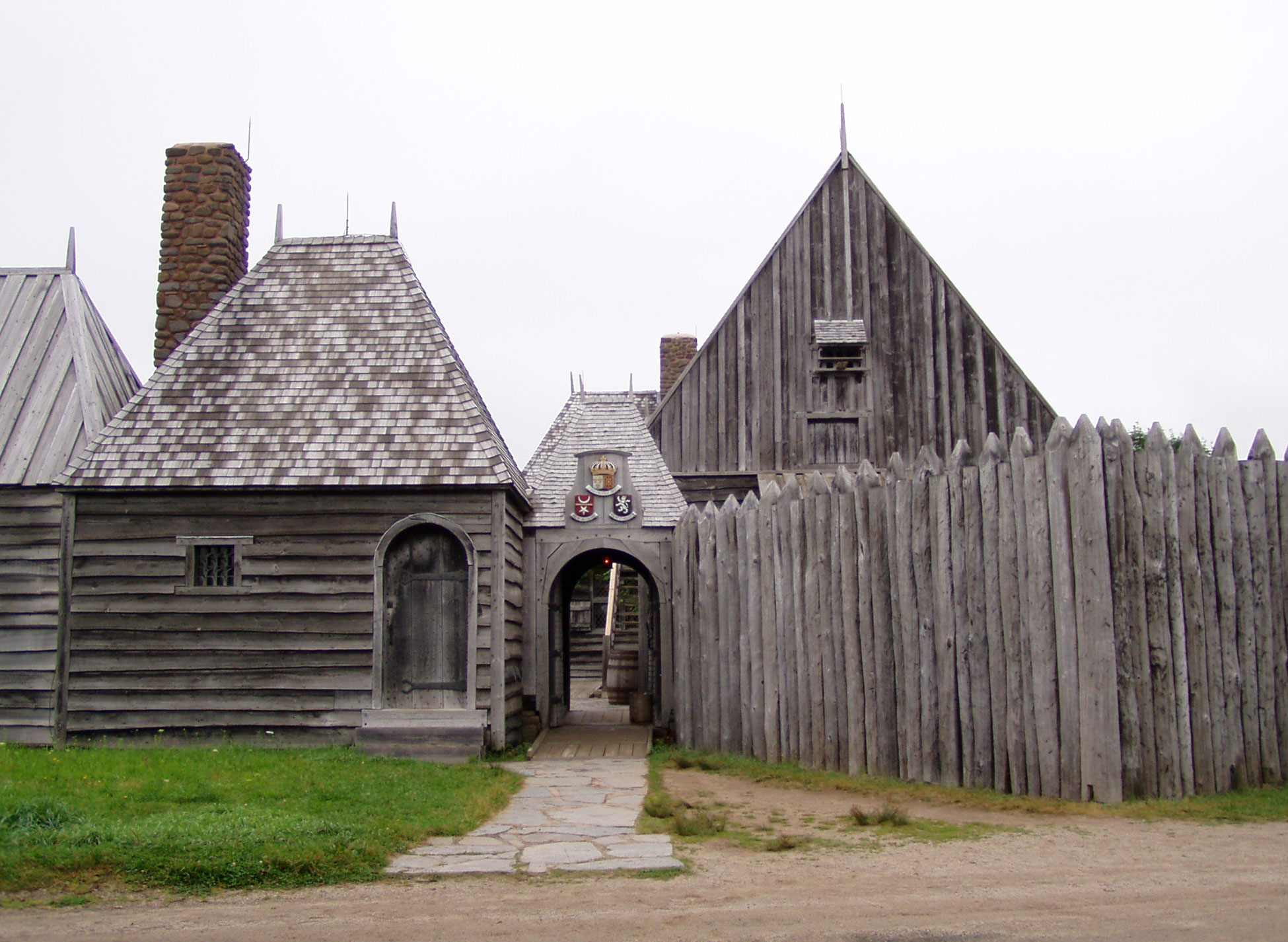
- The entrance into the replica of the Habitation at Port-Royal.

- Location within Nova Scotia
- 44°42′40.55″N 65°36′33.0″W
- Location: 53 Historic Lane, Granville Ferry, Nova Scotia

History
- Built: 1605-1613

Site notes
- Area: 1 hectare (2.5 acres)
- Governing body: Parks Canada

National Historic Site of Canada
- Official name: Port-Royal National Historic Site of Canada
- Designated: May 25, 1923

Port-Royal National Historic Site is a National Historic Site located on the north bank of the Annapolis Basin in Granville Ferry, Nova Scotia, Canada. The site is the location of the Habitation at Port-Royal, which was the centre of activity for the New France colony of Port Royal in Acadia from 1605 to 1613, when it was destroyed by English forces from the Colony of Virginia.

== History ==
The French colony of Port Royal, centered on the habitation, was the first successful attempt by Europeans to establish a permanent settlement in what is today known as Canada. The habitation's active period was from 1605 to 1613. Although the European settlement of Port Royal persevered, with some interruptions, the habitation's role as the focus of the colony ended with its destruction in 1613.

In 1629, Charles Fort, now Fort Anne, was established by Scottish settlers. The founding of the new fort permanently shifted the Port Royal colony's centre of activity. The settlement around the new fort would evolve into the modern day town of Annapolis Royal.

=== 20th century ===
On May 25, 1925, the national Historic Sites and Monuments Board recognized the original Habitation at for its heritage significance, and the then Minister of the Interior, Charles Stewart, designated it Port-Royal National Historic Site.

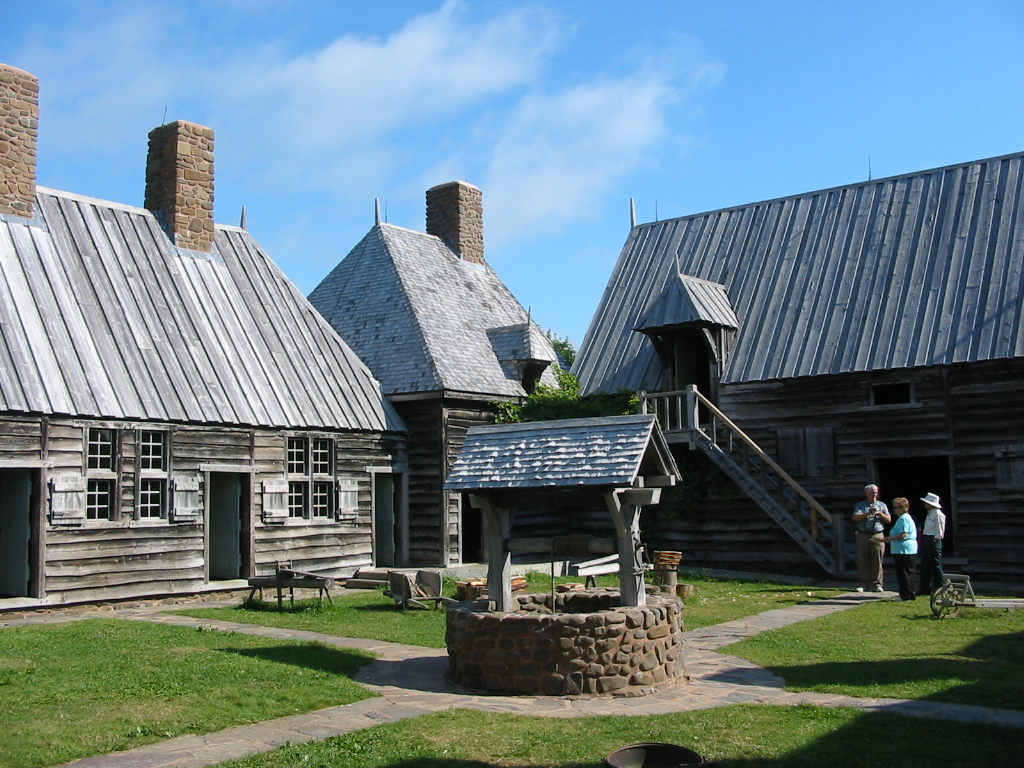
The replica at Port-Royal National Historic Site

In the 1930s, the approximate site of the original Habitation was located in the community and the results of archaeological excavations fed public interest in the period of the original French settlement. This interest had been increasing since the publication of Quietly My Captain Waits, an historical novel by the Canadian novelist Evelyn Eaton set in Port-Royal in the early 17th century.

In the early 1900s, chiefly under the leadership of Harriette Taber Richardson, a native of Cambridge, Massachusetts, and summer resident of the nearby town of Annapolis Royal, Nova Scotian preservationists and historians began lobbying the Government of Canada to build a replica of the Habitation which stood from 1605 until its destruction in 1613.

The government agreed to have the replica built on the original site. Construction took place from 1939 to 1941 and was based on a duplicate set of plans for the original Habitation that had been recently discovered in France. This was the first National Historic Site to have a replica structure built.

Today, this replica serves as the cornerstone of Port-Royal National Historic Site, and, coupled with nearby Fort Anne National Historic Site in Annapolis Royal, continues to commemorate this important historic region for visitors. Today, the replica of the Habitation is considered a milestone in the national heritage movement. Operated by Parks Canada, it is open to the public as a unit of the national park system, staffed by historical interpreters in period costumes, and is a major tourist attraction. Costumed interpreters provide demonstrations of such historic early 17th-century activities as farming, building, cooking, fur trading and Mi'kmaq life.

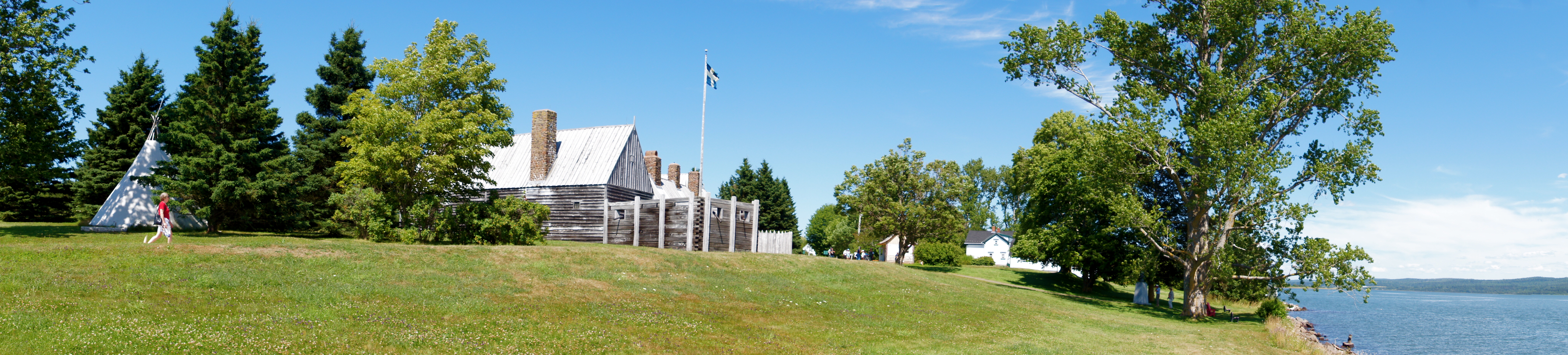
The Port Royal National Historic Site is situated on the Annapolis River where it widens to form the Annapolis Basin
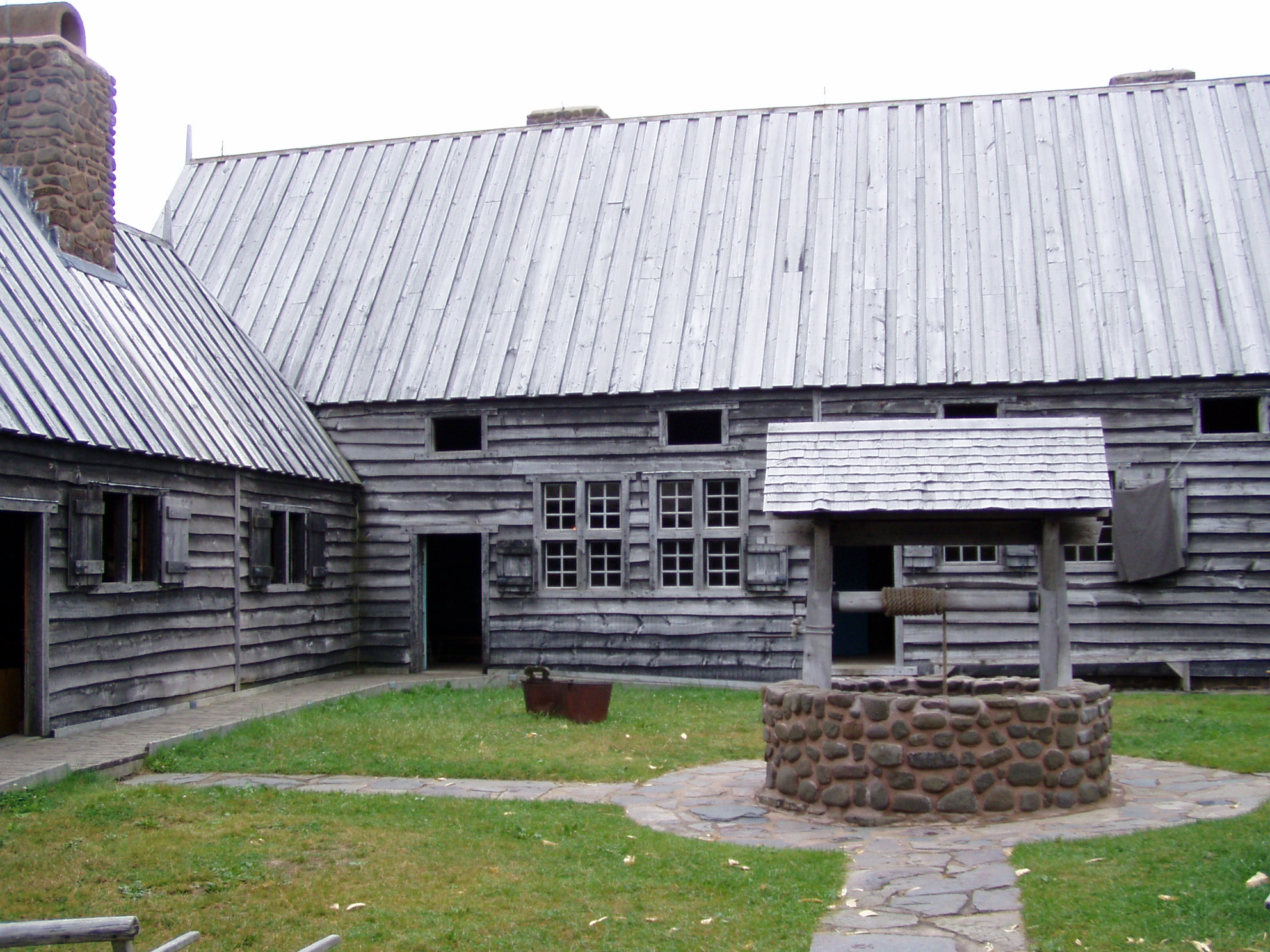
Courtyard

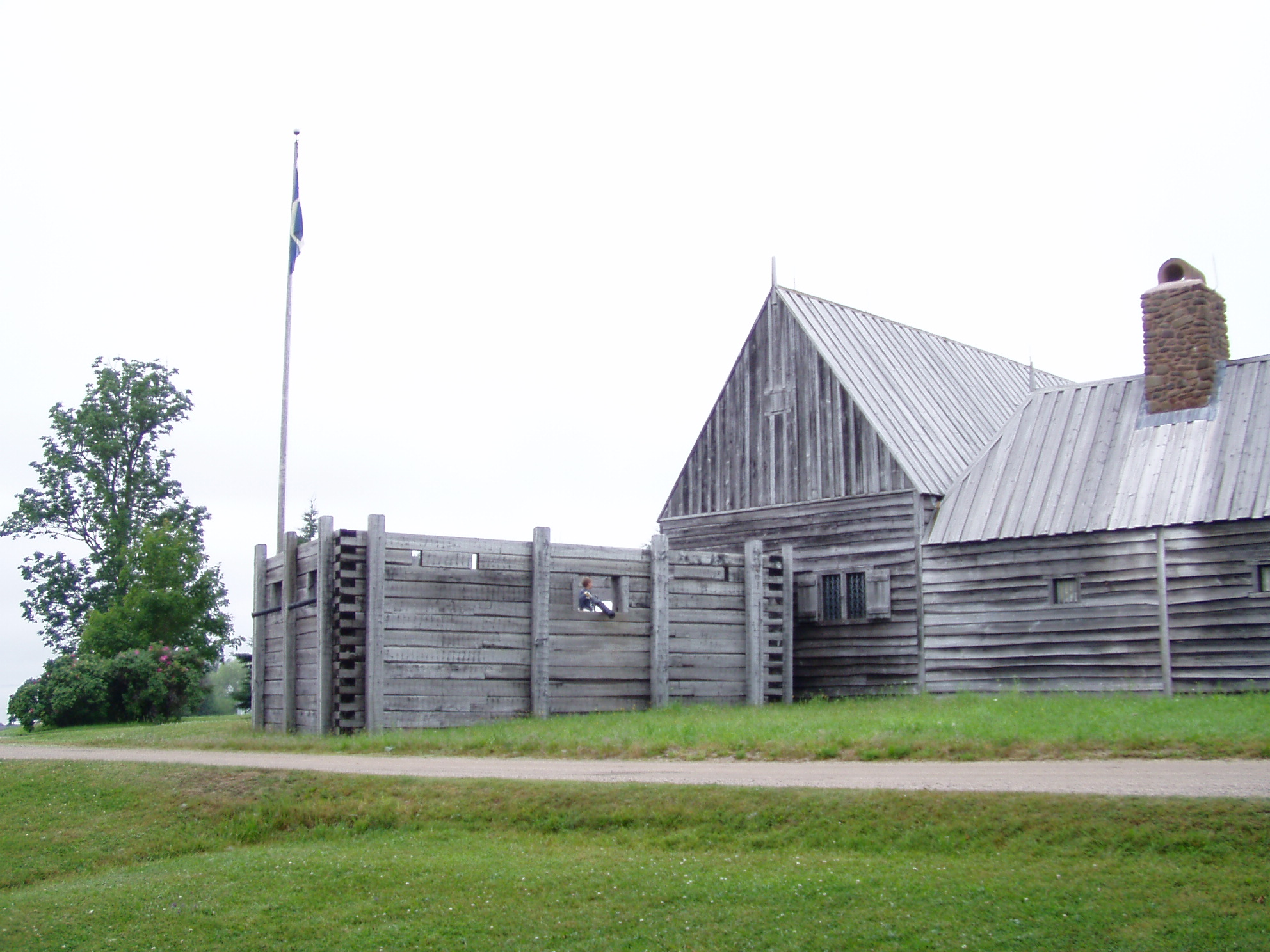
Outside view

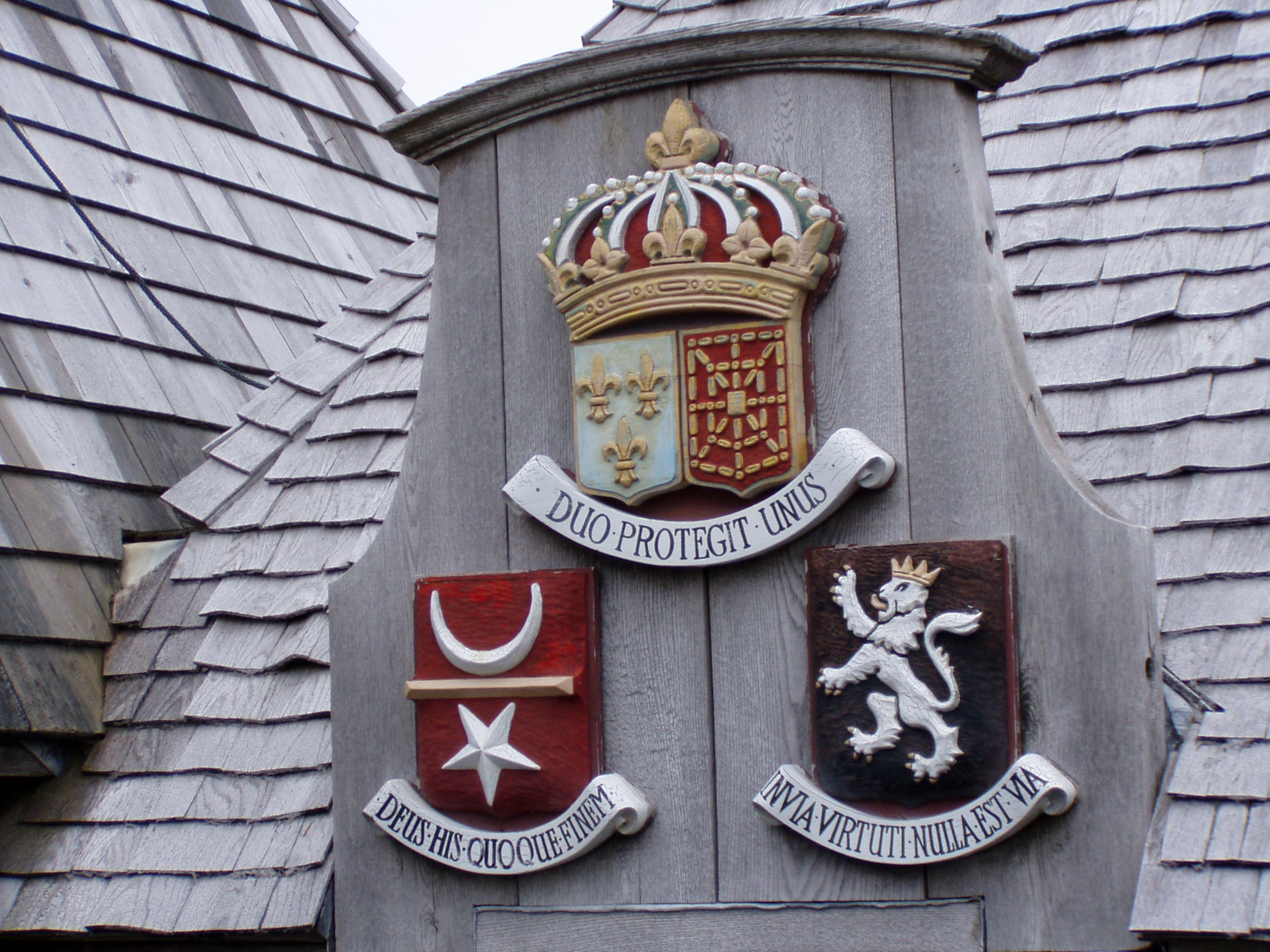
Royal arms of France

== See also ==
- Military history of Nova Scotia
- History of Nova Scotia
- History of Acadia
- Royal eponyms in Canada
- Monarchy in Nova Scotia
- Canadian Register of Historic Places
- Former colonies and territories in Canada
- History of Canada
- List of National Historic Sites of Canada
