= 1608 in Quebec =

Events from the year 1608 in Quebec.

== Events ==
- The first group of French settlers arrive in what is today Tadoussac, marking the beginning of a continuous Francophone presence in North America.
- Quebec City is founded. The first city in New France begins as a fortified point. Constructions are begun on July 3 under Samuel de Champlain.

== Births ==
John Milton was born in London on December 9, 1608, to John and Sara Milton.
