= Tabagie =

Tabagie may refer to:

- Tabagie (feast), a traditional festivity among the Algonquin peoples of Eastern Canada
- Tabagie (room), a room designated for smoking tobacco
