= François Gravé Du Pont =

Canadian fur trader (1560–1629)

- Born: 1560; Saint-Malo, France
- Died: 1629 (aged 68–69)
- Occupation: Navigator

François Gravé (Saint-Malo, November 1560 – 1629 or soon after), said Du Pont (or Le Pont, Pontgravé...), was a Breton navigator (captain on the sea and on the "Big River of Canada"), an early fur trader and explorer in the New World.

== Life ==
François Gravé Du Pont came from the great seaport of Saint-Malo, on the coast of Brittany. Gravé Du Pont had borne arms before becoming a merchant. He is known to have traded furs in the New France, since maybe 1580, surely before 1599, reaching Trois-Rivières in that year.

In 1599, he and Pierre de Chauvin de Tonnetuit founded a fur trading post at Tadoussac. He would have liked to go farther up the river, but his partner refused to do any exploring.

In 1603 he returned there on the Bonne-Renommée, with two Montagnais Indians having lived in France for the last year, and accompanied by a new observer, Samuel de Champlain, his nephew. They met with Begourat and Anadabijou, chiefs of the Montagnais Innu, who summered in the Tadoussac area, at a tabagie feast, and made a strong alliance with them and their nation. That summer, Du Pont went with Champlain exploring the Saint Lawrence River as far as the falls later called Chute de la Rivière Saint-Louis in Beauharnois, Quebec and made a new inventory of the St. Lawrence River, after which he resumed fur trading, this time for Aymar de Chaste, who had succeeded the deceased Chauvin as monopoly holder.

In 1604, Gravé Du Pont was in the service of Pierre Dugua, Sieur de Mons, who had been given a fur trade monopoly for Acadia. They sailed with 79 men and explored the Bay of Fundy. De Monts decided to stay on an island on the St. Croix River on the western side of the Bay of Fundy. It was thought that the area offered protection from raiders. Francois Grave Du Pont and Jean de Biencourt de Poutrincourt sailed back to France before winter. Grave Du Pont arrived back at St. Croix in June 1605 with 2 ships, men, and supplies. They spent 6 weeks exploring the coast (all the way down to Cape Cod) to find a better place to settle. They chose a spot on the north side, opposite Goat Island, which became Port-Royal. They built structures at Port Royal using the materials from the buildings they had constructed on Ile St. Croix.

In March 1606, Du Pont ordered a barque to travel from the Bay of Fundy to Florida however after just one day it anchored in Seal Cove between Wood Island and Grand Manan, but the winds were so furious as to damage the 17-18 tonne ship throwing it on the shore of Wood Island where the crew repaired and reloaded it for four days before returning to the settlement of Samuel de Champlain near the St. Croix River for a couple weeks before Du Pont gave up on the expedition due to the fog and wind.

In Spring of 1608, two ships set sail from France: the Lévrier, under the command of Dupont-Gravé (François Gravé, Sieur du Pont, who was also in charge of the expedition), departed on April 5; the Don de Dieu, under the command of Samuel de Champlain, departed on April 13. On June 3, Champlain arrived in Tadoussac (the only inland trading post and used by all the major European countries) on the north shore of the St. Lawrence River only to discover that Dupont-Gravé had immediately tried to impose the trade monopoly on the Basque and Spanish captains and had been answered with muskets and cannons. Dupont-Gravé was seriously wounded. Champlain managed to negotiate a truce with the other traders and Dupont-Gravé agreed to share the trade with the Montagnais.

From 1608 to 1629, Du Pont returned to the Saint Lawrence River.

DuPont's son abandoned the ship left to his care and went to live among the indigenous tribes, adopting their customs for himself. He was arrested by Jean de Biencourt de Poutrincourt in 1610 but escaped captivity. The following year Jesuit priest Pierre Biard found the younger DuPont and brought him out on White Head Island to take public Confession, participate in Holy Mass and receive Communion reconciling himself to Poutrincourt. The younger DuPont asked Poutrincourt to dine with him as he reclaimed the ship left to his care, but during the meal Potrincourt lost his temper and seized the ship requiring Biard to come out again to make peace between the pair.
