= Begourat =

Begourat (fl. 1603) was a chief of the Montagnais Indians whose summer home was at Tadoussac.

It was at Tadoussac that summer that Begourat met with François Gravé Du Pont and Samuel de Champlain. He was preparing to lead a war-party against the Iroquois in the Richelieu River area. Champlain detailed the pre-raid events in his journals.

At the time of the departure of the French, Begourat gave his son to Gravé Du Pont to take to France.
