= Anishinaabe Scout =

Coordinates: 45.42843°N 75.69934°W

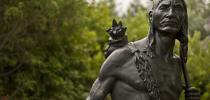
- Anishinaabe Scout
- Location: Major's Hill Park, Ottawa, Canada

Anishinaabe Scout is a statue in Ottawa, Canada. It is located in Major's Hill Park, however it was originally part of a sculpture to Samuel De Champlain which resides across the road within Nepean Point park in Ottawa, Ontario. The Champlain sculpture was created by Hamilton MacCarthy and installed in 1915. In 1918, MacCarthy created a bronze sculpture of a kneeling “Indian,” originally envisioned to be seen kneeling in a canoe. Group funding of the sculpture however, ran out of money needed to fabricate the canoe and as a result only the "Indian Scout” was placed on the pedestal at the base of Champlain's monument. In the 1990s the Assembly of First Nations protested the subservient placement of the Indian Scout in relation to Samuel de Champlain, and successfully lobbied for it to be removed from the monument. The “Indian” sculpture was renamed Anishinabe Scout and now sits in Major's Hill Park, a short distance away from its original home.

== Gallery ==
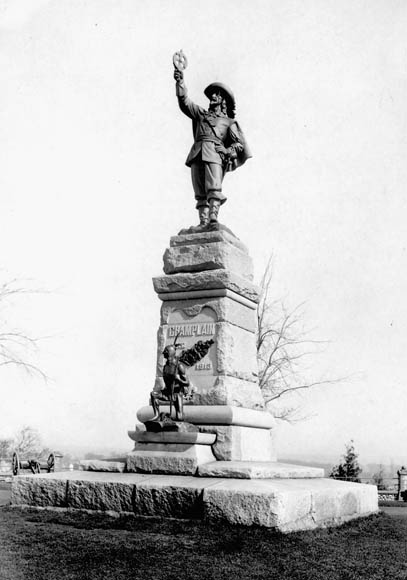
Original photo of Champlain Statue with Anishinaabe Scout

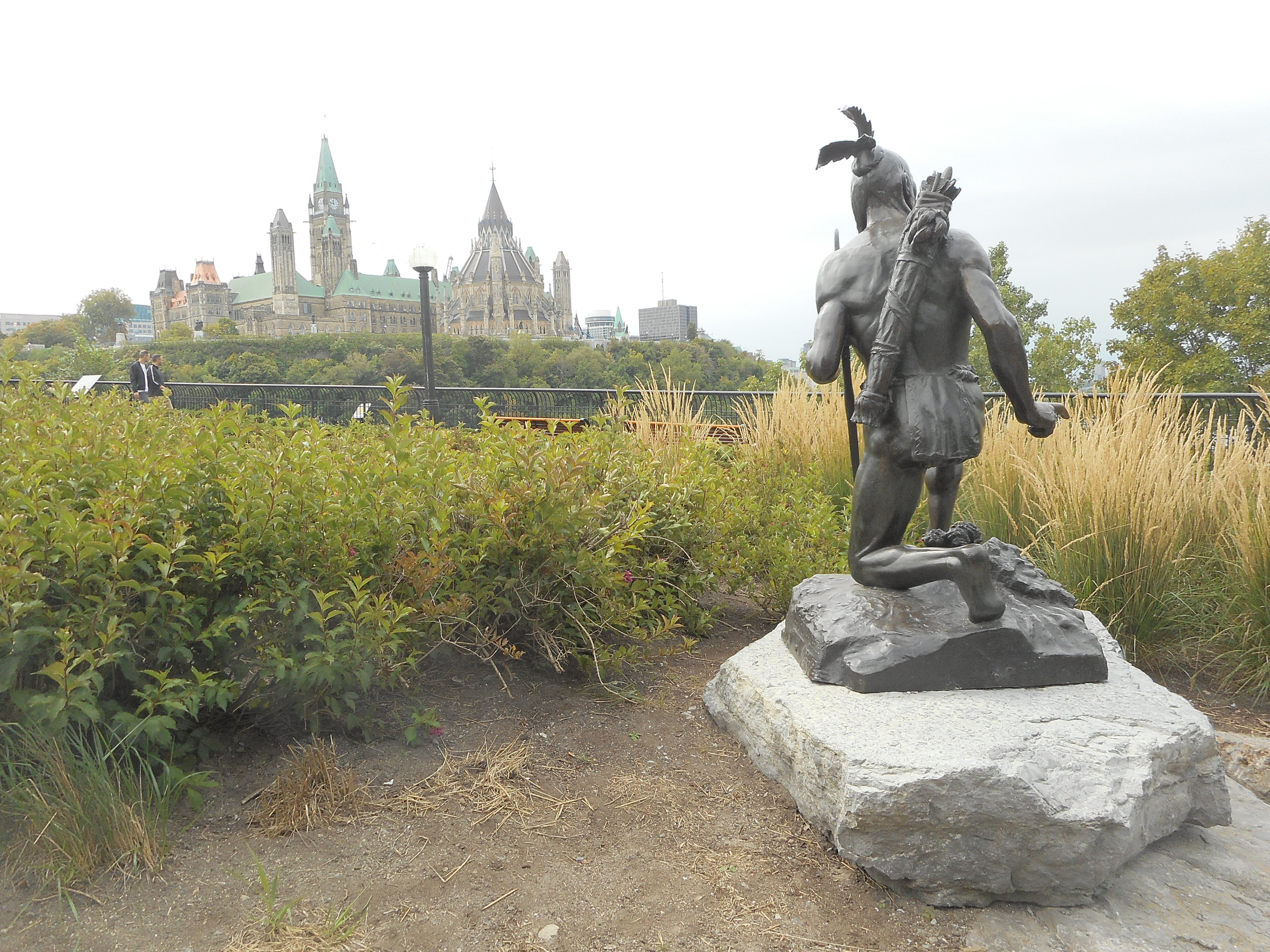
Anishinaabe Scout from rear, with the Parliament Hill in the background

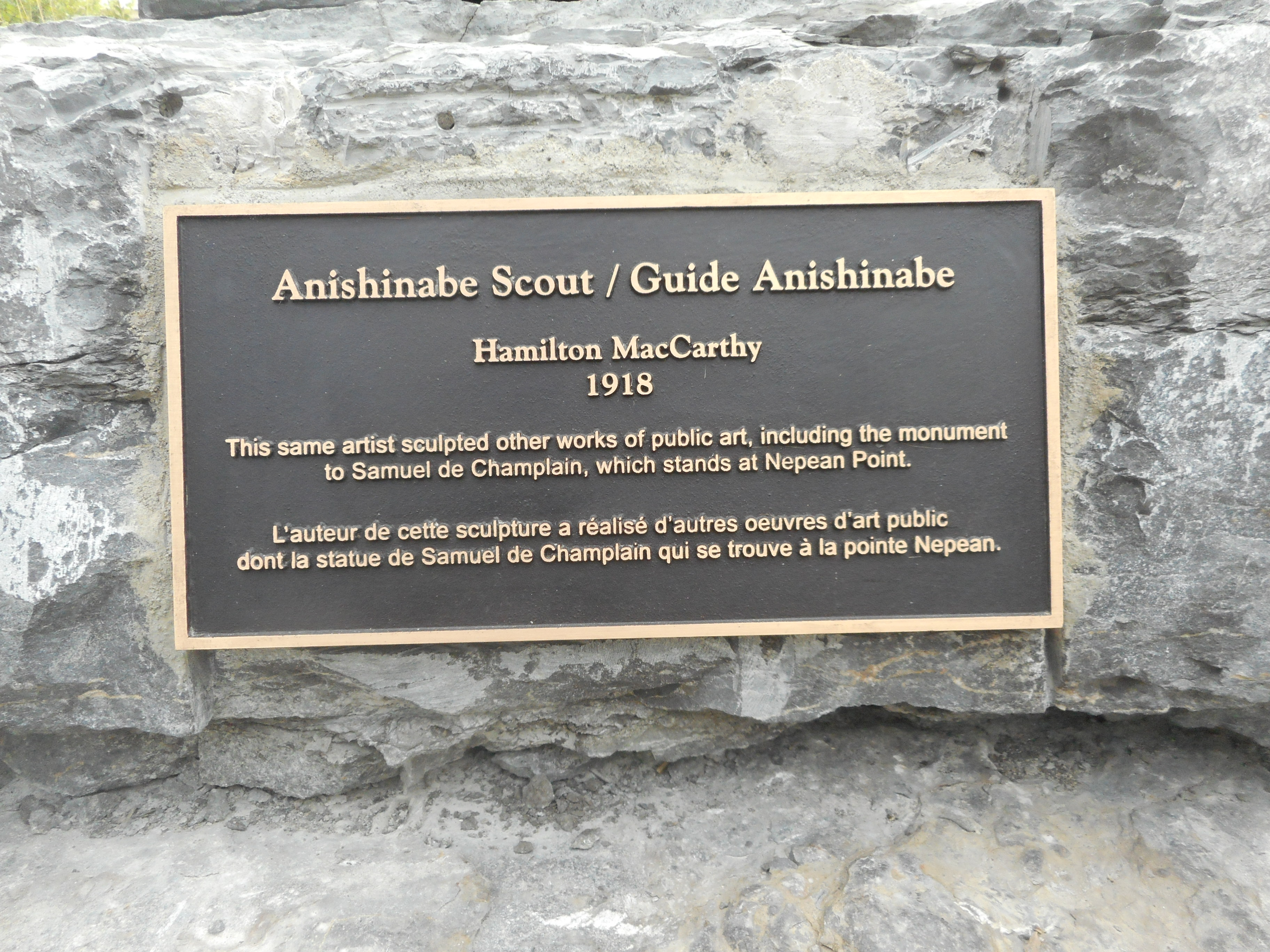
Plaque accompanying Anishinaabe Scout

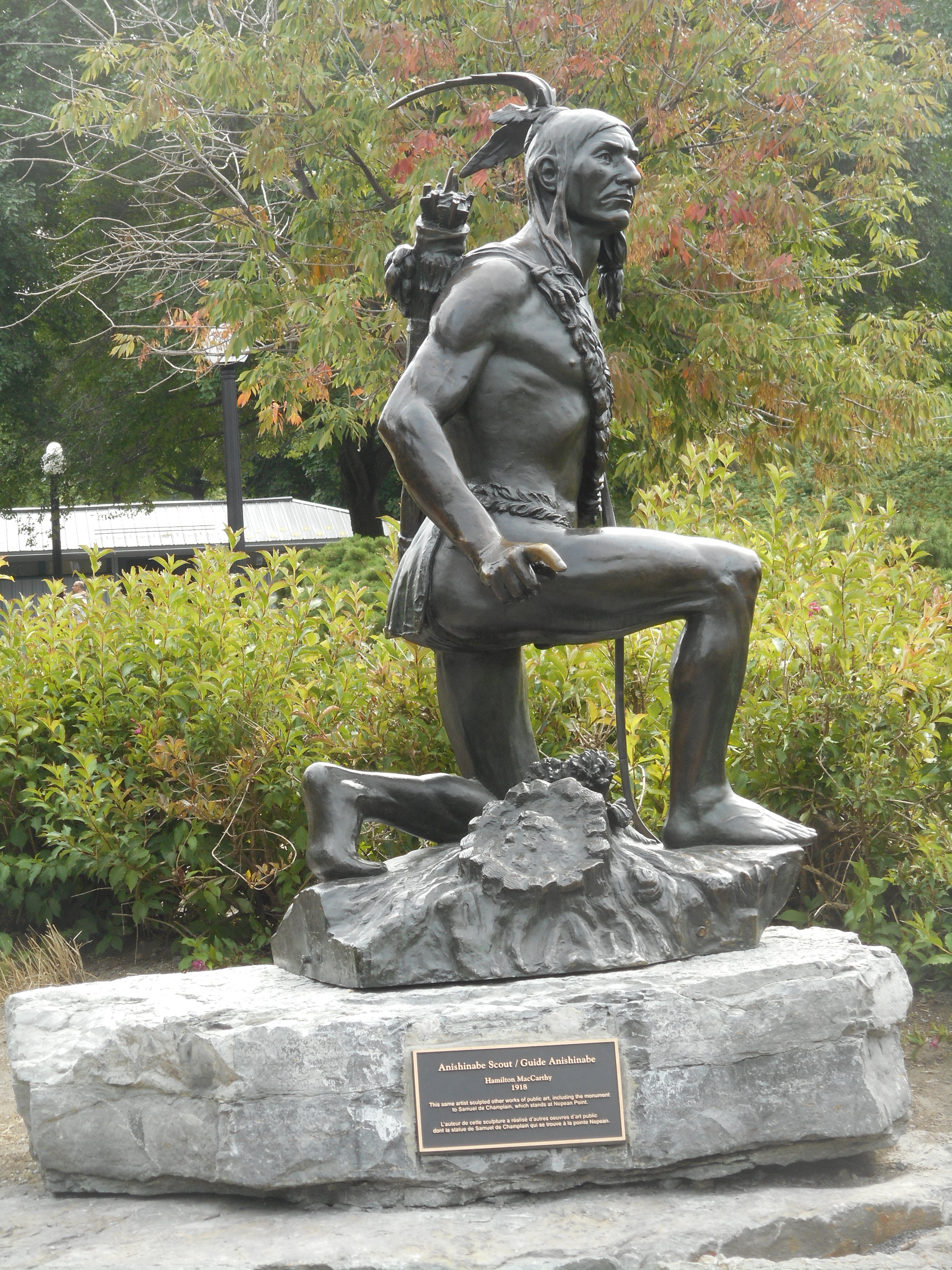
Anishinaabe Scout in Major's Hill Park
