= Samuel de Champlain =

French explorer of North America (1574–1635)

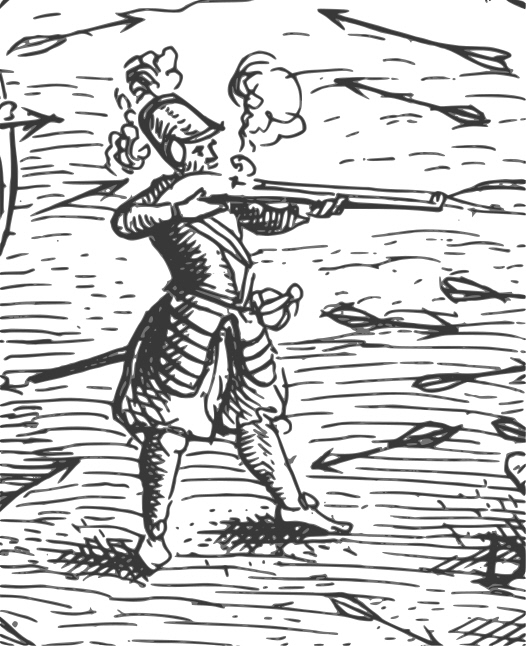
- Detail from "Défaite des Iroquois au Lac de Champlain", Champlain Voyages (1613). This self-portrait is the only surviving contemporary likeness of the explorer.
- Born: Samuel Champlain; 13 August 1574; Hiers-Brouage or La Rochelle, Aunis, Kingdom of France
- Died: 25 December 1635 (aged 61); Quebec City, New France (now Quebec, Canada)
- Other name: "The Father of New France"
- Occupations: Navigator, cartographer, soldier, explorer, colonial administrator, chronicler
- Spouse: Hélène Boullé (m. 1610)

Samuel de Champlain (French: [samɥɛl də ʃɑ̃plɛ̃]; baptized 13 August 1574 (Note: The baptismal record was discovered in 2012 by genealogist Jean-Marie Germe in the Protestant temple register of Saint-Yon, La Rochelle. While this document for "Samuel Chapeleau" matches Champlain's known parents (Antoine and Marguerite Le Roy), scholars note that these were common names in the region, and definitive identification awaits additional corroborating evidence.) – 25 December 1635) was a French explorer, navigator, cartographer, soldier, geographer, diplomat, and chronicler who founded Quebec City and established New France as a permanent French colony in North America.

Champlain made between 21 and 29 voyages across the Atlantic Ocean during his career, founding Quebec on 3 July 1608. As an accomplished cartographer, he created the first accurate maps of North America's eastern coastline and the Great Lakes region, combining direct observation with information provided by Indigenous peoples. His detailed maps and written accounts provided Europeans with their first comprehensive understanding of the geography and peoples of northeastern North America.

Born into a family of mariners, Champlain began exploring North America in 1603 under the guidance of François Gravé Du Pont. From 1604 to 1607, he participated in establishing Port Royal in Acadia, the first permanent European settlement north of Florida. His subsequent founding of Quebec in 1608 marked the beginning of sustained French colonization in the St. Lawrence River valley.

Champlain forged crucial alliances with local Innu (Montagnais), Algonquin, and Wendat (Huron) peoples, relationships that proved essential to the survival and growth of New France. He participated in their conflicts against the Haudenosaunee Confederacy and spent extended periods living among Indigenous communities, making detailed ethnographic observations that formed the basis of his published works.

In 1620, King Louis XIII ordered Champlain to cease exploration and focus on colonial administration. (Note: According to historian Marcel Trudel, this marked the end of Champlain's career as an active explorer. Louis XIII, then only 18 years old, instructed Champlain to maintain the colony "in obedience to me, making the people who are there live as closely in conformity with the laws of my kingdom as you can." (Trudel, Marcel (1979). "Samuel de Champlain." Dictionary of Canadian Biography, vol. 1.)) Although he never held the formal title of governor due to his non-noble status, Champlain effectively governed New France until his death in Quebec on 25 December 1635. His legacy includes numerous geographical features named in his honor, most notably Lake Champlain, and recognition as the "Father of New France."

== Early life ==
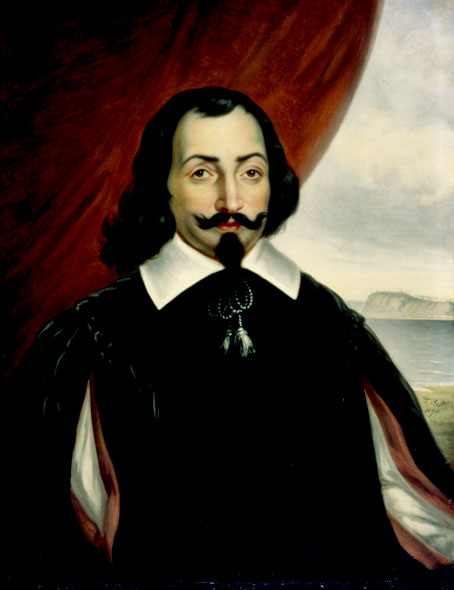
Inauthentic depiction of Champlain, by Théophile Hamel (1870), after the one by Ducornet, based on a portrait of Michel Particelli d'Émery by Balthasar Moncornet. No authentic portrait of Champlain is known to exist.

=== Birth and family origins ===
Samuel de Champlain's exact birth date and location remain subjects of scholarly debate. He was the son of Antoine Champlain (also recorded as "Anthoine Chappelain" in some documents) and Marguerite Le Roy, and was likely born in the French province of Aunis, in either Hiers-Brouage or the port city of La Rochelle.

The traditional birth year of 1567, established by 19th-century historian Pierre-Damien Rainguet and reinforced by Canadian Catholic priest Laverdière in his 1870 Œuvres de Champlain, has been widely accepted and appears on numerous monuments. However, Léopold Delayant challenged this date as early as 1867, and subsequent research has revealed that Rainguet's calculations were based on incorrect assumptions.

In 1978, historian Jean Liebel conducted groundbreaking archival research and concluded that Champlain was born in approximately 1580 in Brouage. Liebel suggested that earlier scholars may have preferred dates when Brouage was under Catholic control (1567, 1570, and 1575) rather than Protestant occupation.

Most recently, in 2012, French genealogist Jean-Marie Germe discovered a baptismal record dated 13 August 1574 in the Saint-Yon Protestant temple register at La Rochelle for one Samuel Chapeleau, son of Antoine Chapeleau and Marguerite Le Roy. While the similarity between "Chapeleau" and "Champlain" is striking, and the parental names match, scholars remain cautious about definitively identifying this record as Champlain's baptism. The names Antoine and Marguerite Le Roy were common in the region, and "Chapeleau" was a frequent surname in Saintonge. Before this document can be accepted as Champlain's baptismal certificate, additional corroborating sources are essential.

=== Family background and early environment ===
Champlain belonged to a Roman Catholic family, though his Old Testament first name suggests possible Protestant origins, which would align with the 1574 baptismal record found in a Protestant temple. The family appears to have owned property in both Brouage and La Rochelle, explaining historical confusion about his birthplace.

Brouage, a fortified port town important for the salt trade, frequently changed hands between Catholic and Protestant forces during the French Wars of Religion. From 1627 until his death in 1635, Cardinal Richelieu served as governor of this royal fortress. At the time of Champlain's birth, his parents were living in Brouage, where they owned substantial property that Samuel would later inherit.

=== Maritime education and early training ===
Sir Sandford Fleming Park, Halifax, Nova Scotia – Stone from Samuel de Champlain's birthplace in Brouage, France (1574)

Born into a family of mariners—both his father and uncle-in-law were sailors or navigators—Champlain received practical maritime education from an early age. He learned navigation, cartography, drafting, and the writing of practical reports. Unlike many educated men of his era, his education did not include Ancient Greek or Latin, indicating a practical rather than classical schooling focused on seamanship and commerce.

As French vessels were required to provide their own defense, Champlain also acquired military skills with firearms. He gained combat experience serving with King Henry IV's army during the final stages of the French Wars of Religion in Brittany from 1594 or 1595 to 1598. Beginning as a quartermaster responsible for provisioning and horse care, he advanced to "capitaine d'une compagnie" by 1597, commanding a garrison near Quimper.

During this military service, Champlain claimed to have undertaken a "certain secret voyage" for the king and likely participated in combat, possibly including the Siege of Fort Crozon in late 1594. This military experience would prove valuable in his later colonial endeavors, providing him with leadership skills and knowledge of defensive tactics essential for establishing settlements in contested territories.

== Early travels ==
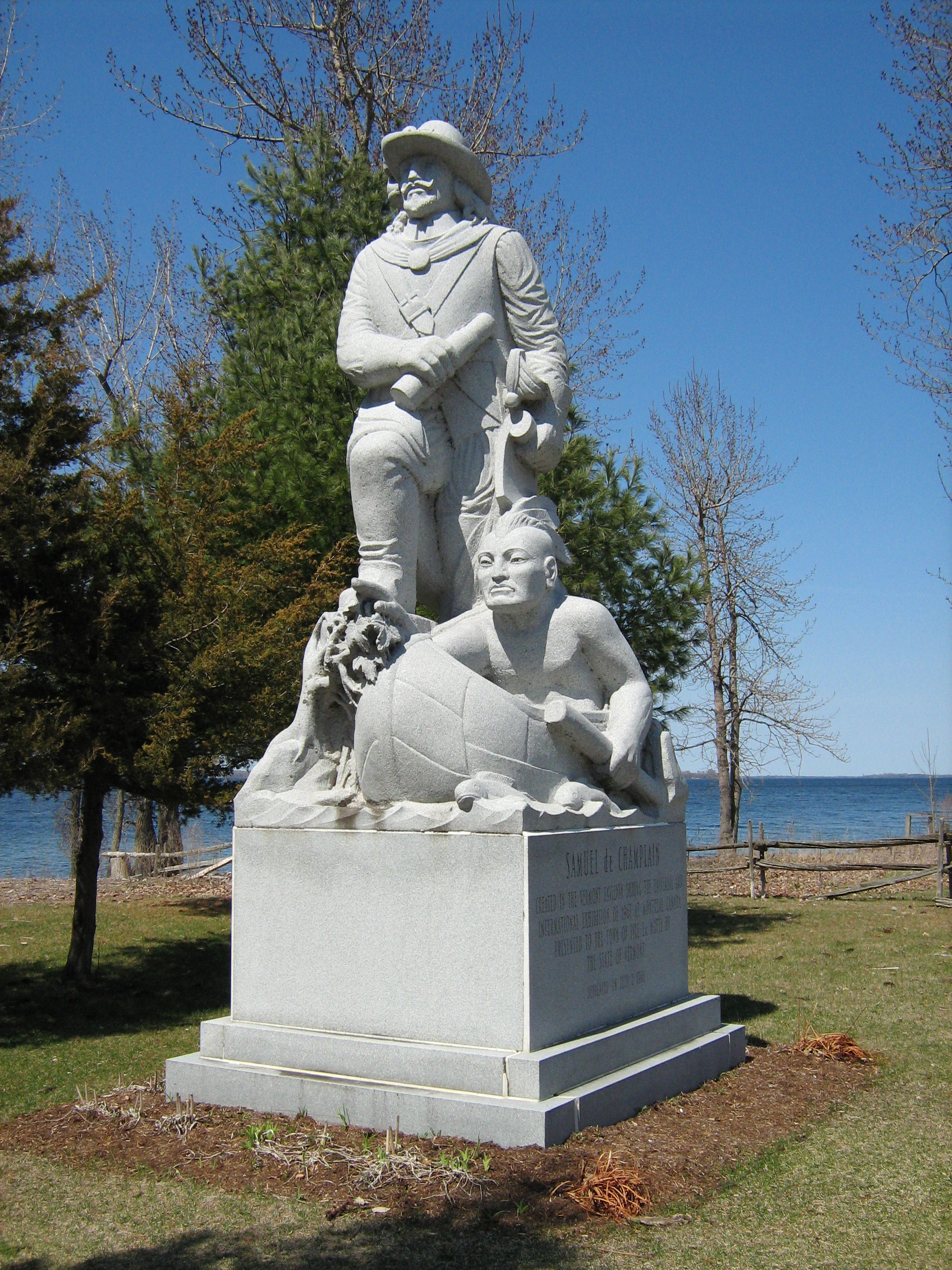
Champlain and guide in Isle La Motte, Vermont, at the site Champlain is said to have first set foot in Vermont (and encamped) in 1609. Lake Champlain is in the background. (Sculptor E.L.Weber, 1967; Photo by Matt Wills, 2009)

In year 3, his uncle-in-law François Gravé du Pont, a navigator whose ship Saint-Julien was to transport Spanish troops to Cádiz under the Treaty of Vervins, allowed Champlain to accompany him.

After a difficult passage, he spent some time in Cádiz before his uncle, whose ship was then chartered to accompany a large Spanish fleet to the West Indies, again offered him a place on the ship. His uncle, who gave command of the ship to Jeronimo de Valaebrera, instructed the young Champlain to watch over the ship.

This journey lasted two years and allowed Champlain to see or hear about Spanish holdings from the Caribbean to Mexico City. Along the way, he took detailed notes, wrote an illustrated report on what he learned on this trip, and gave this secret report to King Henry, (Note: Three different handwritten copies of this report still exist. One of them is at the John Carter Brown Library at Brown University.) who rewarded Champlain with an annual pension.

This report was published for the first time in 1870, by Laverdière, as Brief Discours des Choses plus remarquables que Samuel Champlain de Brouage a reconneues aux Indes Occidentalles au voiage qu'il en a faict en icettes en l'année 1599 et en l'année 1601, comme ensuite (and in English as Narrative of a Voyage to the West Indies and Mexico 1599–1602).

The authenticity of this account as a work written by Champlain has frequently been questioned, due to inaccuracies and discrepancies with other sources on some points; however, recent scholarship indicates that the work probably was authored by Champlain. (Note: For a detailed treatment of claims against Champlain's authorship, see the chapter by François-Marc Gagnon in Litalien (2004), pp. 84ff. Fischer (2008), pp. 586ff also addresses these claims and accepts Champlain's authorship.)

On Champlain's return to Cádiz in August 1600, his uncle Guillermo Elena (Guillaume Allene), who had fallen ill, asked him to look after his business affairs. This Champlain did, and when his uncle died in June 1601, Champlain inherited his substantial estate. It included an estate near La Rochelle, commercial properties in Spain, and a 150-ton merchant ship.

This inheritance, combined with the king's annual pension, gave the young explorer a great deal of independence, as he did not need to rely on the financial backing of merchants and other investors.

From 1601 to 1603 Champlain served as a geographer in the court of King Henry IV. As part of his duties, he traveled to French ports. He learned much about North America from the fishermen that seasonally traveled to coastal areas from Nantucket to Newfoundland to capitalize on the rich fishing grounds there.

He also made a study of previous French failures at colonization in the area, including that of Pierre de Chauvin at Tadoussac. When Chauvin forfeited his monopoly on the fur trade in North America in 1602, responsibility for renewing the trade was given to Aymar de Chaste. Champlain approached de Chaste about a position on the first voyage, which he received with the king's assent.

Champlain's first trip to North America was as an observer on a fur-trading expedition led by François Gravé Du Pont. Du Pont was a navigator and merchant who had been a ship's captain on Chauvin's expedition, and with whom Champlain established a firm lifelong friendship.

He educated Champlain about navigation in North America, including the Saint Lawrence River. In dealing with the natives there (and in Acadia after). The Bonne-Renommée (the Good Fame) arrived at Tadoussac on March 15, 1603. Champlain was anxious to see all of the places that Jacques Cartier had seen and described sixty years earlier, and wanted to go even further than Cartier, if possible.

Champlain created a map of the Saint Lawrence on this trip and, after his return to France on 20 September, published an account as Des Sauvages: ou voyage de Samuel Champlain, de Brouages, faite en la France nouvelle l'an 1603 ("Concerning the Savages: or travels of Samuel Champlain of Brouages, made in New France in the year 1603"). (Note: Champlain did not begin using the honorific de in his name until at least 1610 when he married, the year King Henry was murdered. A reprint of this book in 1612 was credited to "Sieur de Champlain, civilization.ca)

Included in his account were meetings with Begourat, chief of the Montagnais at Tadoussac, in which positive relationships were established between the French and the many Montagnais gathered there, with some Algonquin friends.

Promising to King Henry to report on further discoveries, Champlain joined a second expedition to New France in the spring of 1604. This trip, once again an exploratory journey without women and children, lasted several years, and focused on areas south of the St. Lawrence River, in what later became known as Acadia. It was led by Pierre Dugua de Mons, a noble and Protestant merchant who had been given a fur trading monopoly in New France by the king. Dugua asked Champlain to find a site for winter settlement.

After exploring possible sites in the Bay of Fundy, Champlain selected Saint Croix Island in the St. Croix River as the site of the expedition's first winter settlement. After enduring a harsh winter on the island the settlement was relocated across the bay where they established Port Royal. Until 1607, Champlain used that site as his base, while he explored the Atlantic coast. Dugua was forced to leave the settlement for France in September 1605, because he learned that his monopoly was at risk. His monopoly was rescinded by the king in July 1607 under pressure from other merchants and proponents of free trade, leading to the abandonment of the settlement.

In 1605 and 1606, Champlain explored the North American coast as far south as Cape Cod, searching for sites for a permanent settlement. Minor skirmishes with the resident Nausets dissuaded him from the idea of establishing one near present-day Chatham, Massachusetts. He named the area Mallebar ("bad bar").

== Founding of Quebec ==
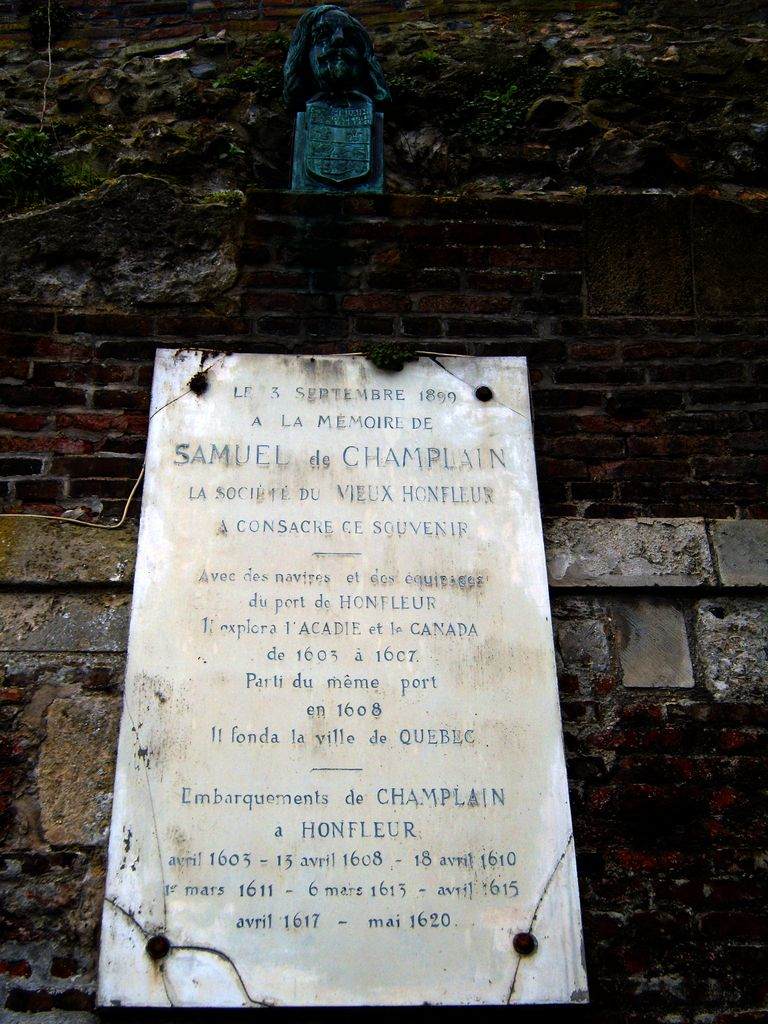
Plaque in Honfleur commemorating Champlain's departures

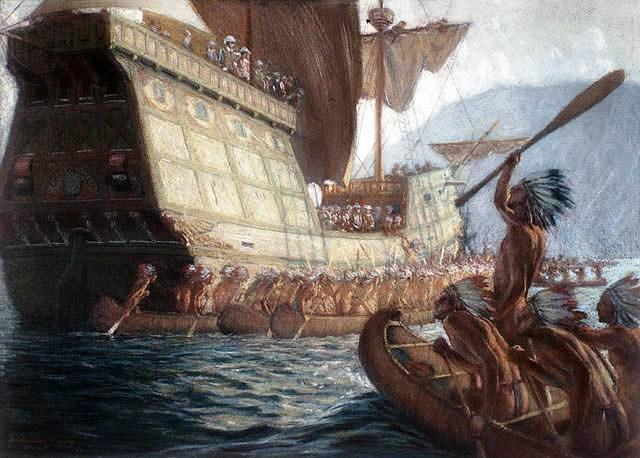
Painting by George Agnew Reid, done for the third centennial (1908), showing the arrival of Samuel de Champlain on the site of Quebec City. (Note: Only at his last arrival (in 1633), Champlain did not leave the ships at Tadoussac but sailed them directly to Quebec City.Trudel (1979))

In the spring of 1608, Dugua wanted Champlain to start a new French colony and fur trading centre on the shores of the St. Lawrence. Dugua equipped, at his own expense, a fleet of three ships with workers, that left the French port of Honfleur. The main ship, called Don-de-Dieu (French for Gift of God), was commanded by Champlain. Another ship, Lévrier (Hunt Dog), was commanded by his friend Du Pont. The small group of male settlers arrived at Tadoussac on the lower St. Lawrence in June. Because of the dangerous strength of the Saguenay River ending there, they left the ships and continued up the "Big River" in small boats bringing the men and the materials.

Upon arriving in Quebec, Champlain later wrote: "I arrived there on the third of July, when I searched for a place suitable for our settlement; but I could find none more convenient or better suited than the point of Quebec, so called by the savages, which was covered with nut-trees." Champlain ordered his men to gather lumber by cutting down the nut-trees for use in building habitations.

Some days after Champlain's arrival in Quebec, Jean du Val, a member of Champlain's party, plotted to kill Champlain to the end of securing the settlement for the Basques or Spaniards and making a fortune for himself. Du Val's plot was ultimately foiled when an associate of Du Val confessed his involvement in the plot to Champlain's pilot, who informed Champlain. Champlain had a young man deliver Du Val, along with 3 co-conspirators and two bottles of wine, and invite the four worthies to an event on board a boat. Soon after the four conspirators arrived on the boat, Champlain had them arrested. Du Val was strangled and hanged in Quebec and his head was displayed in the "most conspicuous place" of Champlain's fort. The other three were sent back to France to be tried.

== Relations and war with Indigenous peoples ==
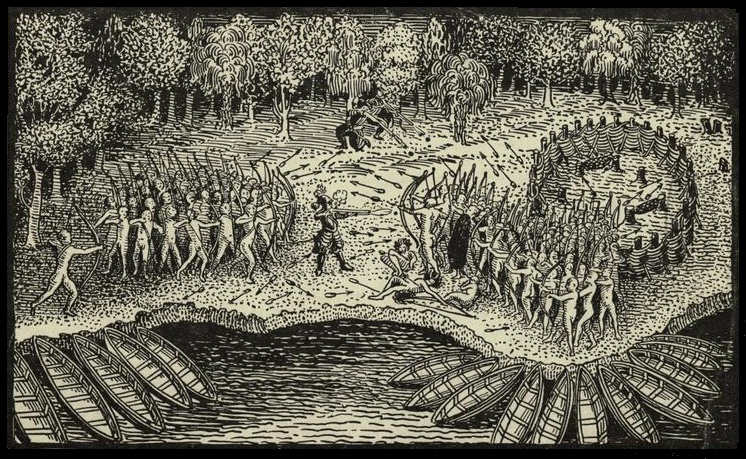
Engraving based on a drawing by Champlain of his 1609 voyage. It depicts a battle between Haudenosaunee (Iroquois) and Algonquian tribes near Lake Champlain

During the summer of 1609, Champlain attempted to form better relations with the local First Nations tribes. He made alliances with the Wendat (called Huron by the French) and with the Algonquin, the Montagnais and the Etchemin, who lived in the area of the St. Lawrence River. These tribes sought Champlain's help in their war against the Haudenosaunee (Iroquois), who lived farther south. Champlain set off with nine French soldiers and 300 natives to explore the Rivière des Iroquois (now known as the Richelieu River), and became the first European to map Lake Champlain. Having had no encounters with the Haudenosaunee at this point many of the men headed back, leaving Champlain with only 2 Frenchmen and 60 natives.

On 29 July, somewhere in the area near Ticonderoga and Crown Point, New York (historians are not sure which of these two places, but Fort Ticonderoga historians claim that it occurred near its site), Champlain and his party encountered a group of Haudenosaunee. In a battle that began the next day, two hundred and fifty Haudenosaunee advanced on Champlain's position, and one of his guides pointed out the three chiefs. In his account of the battle, Champlain recounts firing his arquebus and killing two of them with a single shot, after which one of his men killed the third. The Haudenosaunee turned and fled. While this cowed the Haudenosaunee for some years, they would later return to successfully fight the French and Algonquin for the rest of the century. (Note: In 1701, The Great Peace Treaty was signed in Montreal, involving the French and every Indigenous nation coming or living on the shores of the Saint Lawrence River except maybe in wintertime.)

The Battle of Sorel occurred on 19 June 1610, with Samuel de Champlain supported by the Kingdom of France and his allies, the Wendat people, Algonquin people and Innu people against the Mohawk people in New France at present-day Sorel-Tracy, Quebec. Champlain's forces armed with the arquebus engaged and slaughtered or captured nearly all of the Mohawks. The battle ended major hostilities with the Mohawks for 20 years.

== Marriage ==
One route Champlain may have chosen to improve his access to the court of the regent was his decision to enter into marriage with the 12 year old Hélène Boullé. She was the daughter of Nicolas Boullé, a man charged with carrying out royal decisions at court. The marriage contract was signed on 27 December 1610 in presence of Dugua, who had dealt with the father, and the couple was married three days later. Champlain was then 36 years old. The terms of the contract called for the marriage to be consummated two years later.

Champlain's marriage was initially quite troubled, as Hélène rallied against joining him in August 1613. Their relationship, while it apparently lacked any physical connection, recovered and was apparently good for many years. Hélène lived in Quebec for several years, but returned to Paris and eventually decided to enter a convent. The couple had no children, and Champlain adopted three Montagnais girls named Faith, Hope, and Charity in the winter of 1627–28.

== Exploration of New France ==
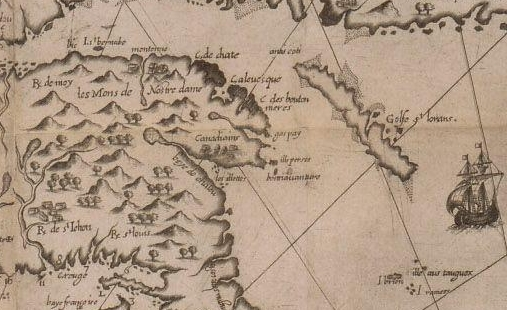
Chaleur Bay and Gulf of Saint Lawrence — extract of Champlain 1612 map

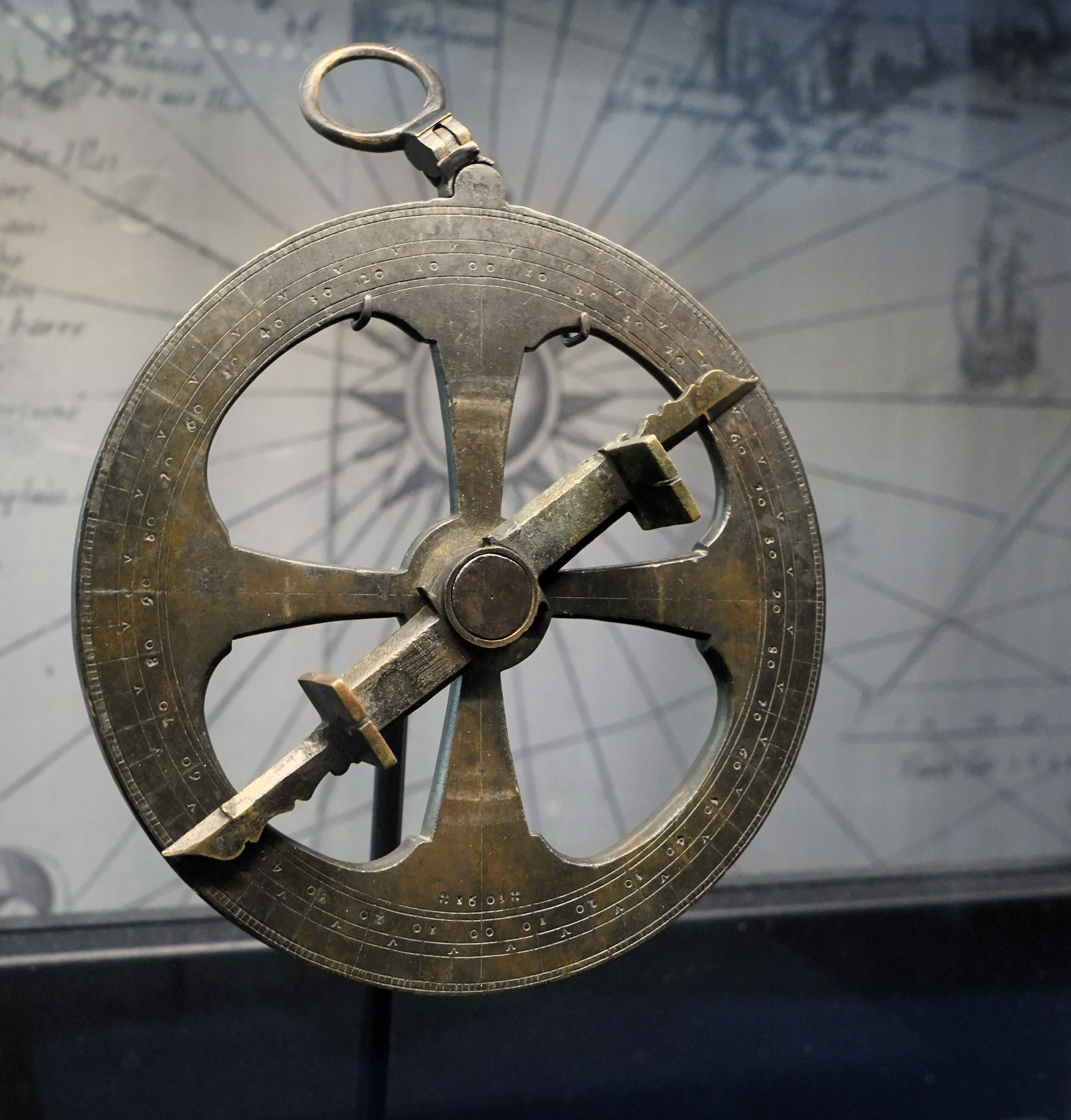
Marine astrolabe thought to have belonged to Champlain, made in France in 1603, and found in Ontario in 1867.

On 29 March 1613, arriving back in New France, he first ensured that his new royal commission be proclaimed. Champlain set out on May 27 to continue his exploration of the Huron country and in hopes of finding the "northern sea" he had heard about (probably Hudson Bay). He travelled the Ottawa River, later giving the first description of this area. (Note: In 1953, a rock was found at a location now known as the Champlain lookout, which bore the inscription "Champlain juin 2, 1613". What about this finding?) Along the way, he apparently dropped or left behind a cache of silver cups, copper kettles, and a brass astrolabe dated 1603 (Champlain's Astrolabe), which was later found August 1867 by a farm boy named Edward Lee near Cobden, Ontario. However, Champlain's ownership of the astrolabe has been questioned by modern scholars. It was in June that he met with Tessouat, the Algonquin chief of Allumettes Island, and offered to build the tribe a fort if they were to move from the area they occupied, with its poor soil, to the locality of the Lachine Rapids.

By 26 August, Champlain was back in Saint-Malo. There, he wrote an account of his life from 1604 to 1612 and his journey up the Ottawa river, his Voyages and published another map of New France. In 1614, he formed the "Compagnie des Marchands de Rouen et de Saint-Malo" and "Compagnie de Champlain", which bound the Rouen and Saint-Malo merchants for eleven years. He returned to New France in the spring of 1615 with four Recollects in order to further religious life in the new colony. The Roman Catholic Church was eventually given en seigneurie large and valuable tracts of land, estimated at nearly 30% of all the lands granted by the French Crown in New France.

In 1615, Champlain reunited with Étienne Brûlé, his capable interpreter, following separate four-year explorations. There, Brûlé reported North American explorations, including that he had been joined by another French interpreter named Grenolle with whom he had travelled along the north shore of la mer douce (the calm sea), now known as Lake Huron, to the great rapids of Sault Ste. Marie, where Lake Superior enters Lake Huron, some of which was recorded by Champlain.

Champlain continued to work to improve relations with the natives, promising to help them in their struggles against the Haudenosaunee. With his native guides, he explored further up the Ottawa River and reached Lake Nipissing. He then followed the French River until he reached Lake Huron.

In 1615, Champlain was escorted through the area that is now Peterborough, Ontario by a group of Wendat. He used the ancient portage between Chemong Lake and Little Lake (now Chemong Road) and stayed for a short period of time near what is now Bridgenorth.

== Military expedition ==
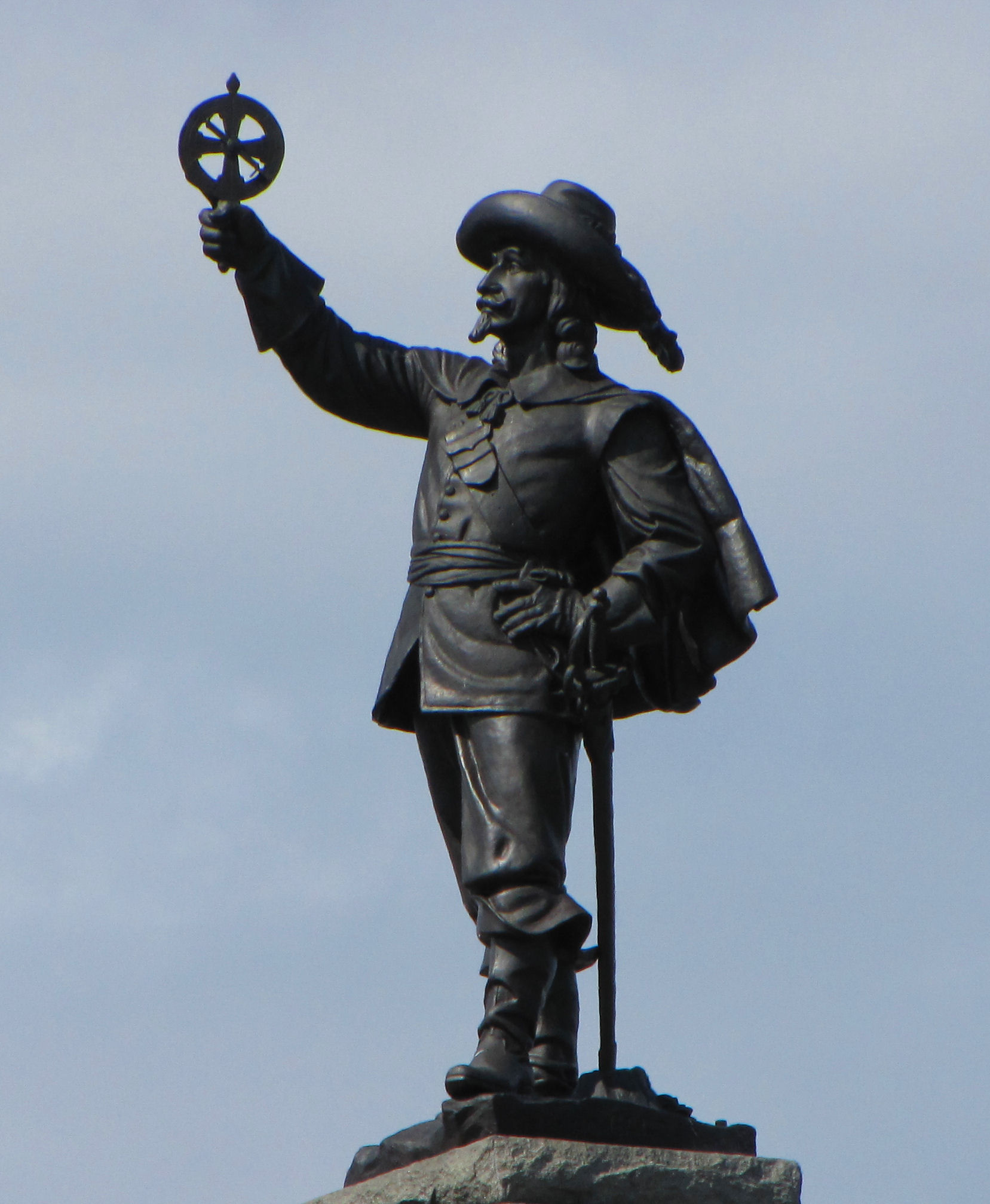
Samuel de Champlain, Nepean Point, Ottawa by Hamilton MacCarthy

On 1 September 1615, at Cahiagué (a Wendat village near what is now Lake Simcoe), he and the northern tribes started a third military campaign against the Haudenosaunee. While he was at Cahiagué, Champlain learned that the Susquehannock were interested in joining the proposed expedition against the Haudenosaunee. The Wendat dispatched a dozen warriors to carry their plans to this tribe, along with Champlain's interpreter Etienne Brule. Although the total number of warriors that finally assembled is not stated, if it resembled the average large Huron war-party, it would’ve been about 500. After several days of delay due to war being an occasion for ritual among the Huron, it left to invade enemy territory. They passed Lake Ontario at its eastern tip, stopping frequently at intervals to hunt and fish for meat to feed the army, then when reaching the Bay of Quinte, they hid their canoes and continued their journey by land. They followed the Oneida River until they arrived at the village of the community they were intending to attack on October 10. The exact location of this place is still a matter of debate. Although the traditional location, Nichols Pond, is regularly disproved by professional and amateur archaeologists, many still claim that Nichols Pond is the location of the battle, 10 miles (16 km) south of Canastota, New York. Pressured by the Indians to attack prematurely, the assault failed. Champlain was wounded twice in the leg by arrows, one in his knee. The conflict ended on October 16 when the French Wendat were forced to flee.

Etienne Brule and the twelve warriors dispatched by the Huron, despite being successful in their plans of convincing the Susquehannock to join them, arrived at the appointed rendezvous two days after the Huron had left for home. Once it was evident that they were too late, they turned back for Carantouan, the principal village of the Susquehannock.

Although he did not want to, the Huron insisted that Champlain spend the winter with them. During his stay, he set off with them in their great deer hunt, during which he became lost and was forced to wander for three days living off game and sleeping under trees until he met up with a band of First Nations people by chance. He spent the rest of the winter learning "their country, their manners, customs, modes of life". On 22 May 1616, he left the Wendat country and returned to Quebec before heading back to France on 2 July.

== Improving administration in New France ==
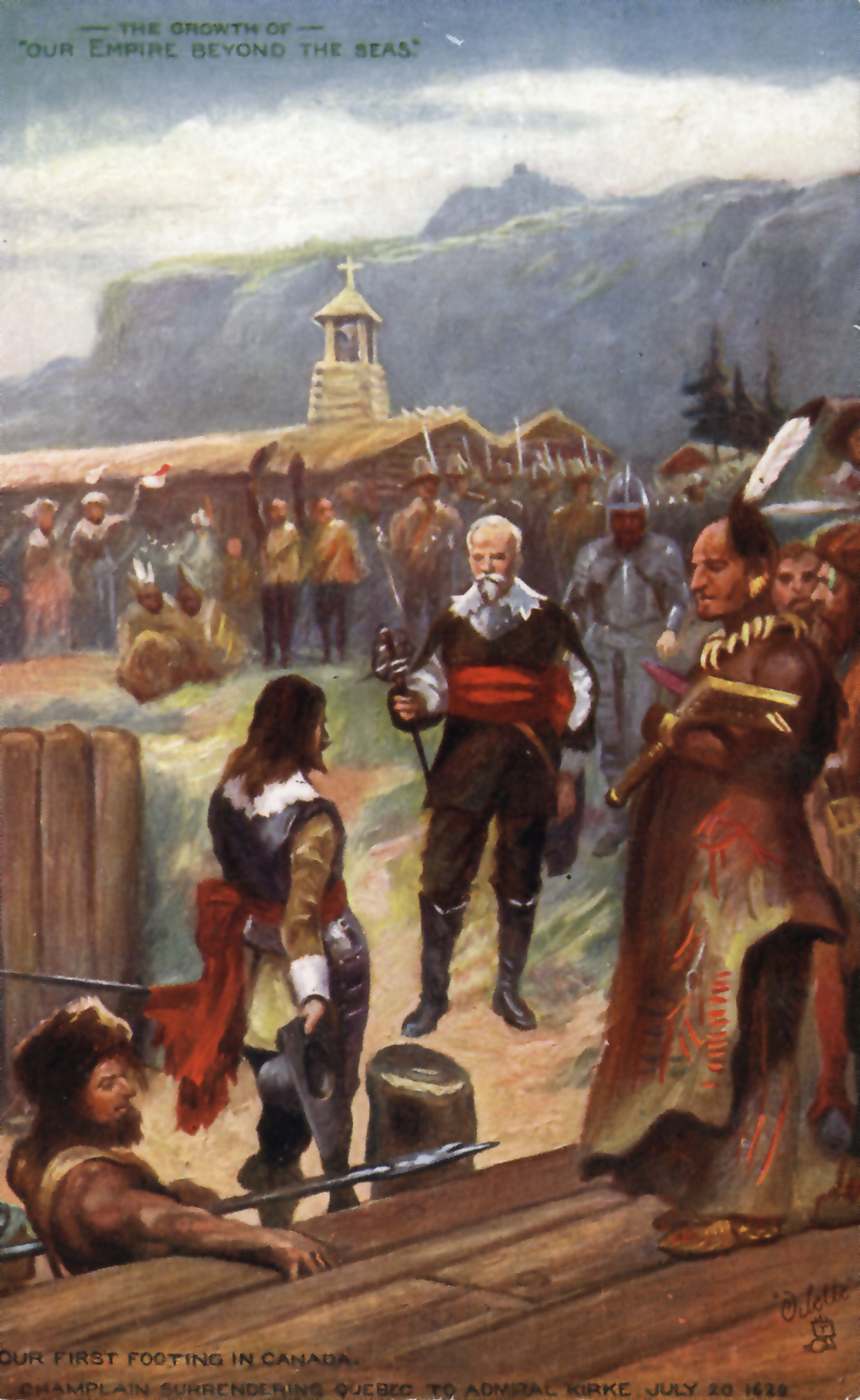
Champlain surrendering Quebec to David Kirke on 20 July 1629

Champlain returned to New France in 1620 and was to spend the rest of his life focusing on administration of the territory rather than exploration. Champlain spent the winter building Fort Saint-Louis on top of Cape Diamond. By mid-May, he learned that the fur trading monopoly had been handed over to another company led by the Caen brothers. After some tense negotiations, it was decided to merge the two companies under the direction of the Caens. Champlain continued to work on relations with the natives and managed to impose on them a chief of his choice. He also negotiated a peace treaty with the Haudenosaunee.

Champlain continued to work on the fortifications of what became Quebec City, laying the first stone on 6 May 1624. On 15 August he once again returned to France where he was encouraged to continue his work as well as to continue looking for a passage to China, something widely believed to exist at the time. By July 5 he was back at Quebec and continued expanding the city.

In 1627 the Caen brothers' company lost its monopoly on the fur trade, and Cardinal Richelieu (who had joined the Royal Council in 1624 and rose rapidly to a position of dominance in French politics that he would hold until his death in 1642) formed the Compagnie des Cent-Associés (the Hundred Associates) to manage the fur trade. Champlain was one of the 100 investors, and its first fleet, loaded with colonists and supplies, set sail in April 1628.

Champlain had overwintered in Quebec. Supplies were low, and English merchants sacked Cap Tourmente in early July 1628. A war had broken out between France and England, and Charles I of England had issued letters of marque that authorized the capture of French shipping and its colonies in North America. Champlain received a summons to surrender on July 10 from English privateer David Kirke. Champlain refused to deal with Kirke, misleading him to believe that Quebec's defenses were better than they actually were (Champlain had only 50 pounds of gunpowder to defend the community). Successfully bluffed, they withdrew, but encountered and captured the French supply fleet, cutting off that year's supplies to the colony. By the spring of 1629 supplies were dangerously low and Champlain was forced to send people to Gaspé and into Indian communities to conserve rations. On July 19, Kirke arrived before Quebec after intercepting Champlain's plea for help, and Champlain was forced to surrender the colony to him on the next day. Many colonists were transported first to England and then to France by Kirke, but Champlain remained in London to begin the process of regaining the colony. A peace treaty had been signed in April 1629, three months before the surrender, and, under the terms of that treaty, Quebec and other prizes that were taken by Kirke after the treaty were to be returned. It was not until the 1632 Treaty of Saint-Germain-en-Laye, however, that Quebec was formally given back to France. (Kirke was rewarded when Charles I knighted him and gave him a charter for Newfoundland.) Champlain reclaimed his role as commander of New France on behalf of Richelieu on 1 March 1633, having served in the intervening years as commander in New France "in the absence of my Lord the Cardinal de Richelieu" from 1629 to 1635. In 1632 Champlain published Voyages de la Nouvelle-France, which was dedicated to Cardinal Richelieu, and Traitté de la marine et du devoir d'un bon marinier, a treatise on leadership, seamanship, and navigation. (Champlain made more than 25 round-trip crossings of the Atlantic in his lifetime, without losing a single ship.)

== Last return, and last years working in Quebec ==
Champlain returned to Quebec on 22 May 1633, after an absence of four years. Richelieu gave him a commission as Lieutenant General of New France, along with other titles and responsibilities, but not that of governor. Despite this lack of formal status, many colonists, French merchants, and Indians treated him as if he had the title; writings survive in which he is referred to as "our governor". On 18 August 1634, he sent a report to Richelieu stating that he had rebuilt on the ruins of Quebec, enlarged its fortifications, and established two more habitations. One was 15 leagues upstream, and the other was at Trois-Rivières. He also began an offensive against the Haudenosaunee, reporting that he wanted them either wiped out or "brought to reason".

== Death and burial ==
Champlain had a severe stroke in October 1635, and died on 25 December, leaving no immediate heirs. Jesuit records state he died in the care of his friend and confessor Charles Lallemant.

Although his will (drafted on 17 November 1635) gave much of his French property to his wife Hélène Boullé, he made significant bequests to the Catholic missions and to individuals in the colony of Quebec. However, Marie Camaret, a cousin on his mother's side, challenged the will in Paris and had it overturned. It is unclear exactly what happened to his estate.

Samuel de Champlain was temporarily buried in the church while a standalone chapel was built to hold his remains in the upper part of the city. This small building, along with many others, was destroyed by a large fire in 1640. Though immediately rebuilt, no traces of it exist. His exact burial site is still unknown, despite much research since about 1850, including several archaeological digs in the city. There is general agreement that the previous Champlain chapel site, and the remains of Champlain, should be somewhere near the Notre-Dame de Québec Cathedral.

The search for Champlain's remains supplies a key plot-line in the crime writer Louise Penny's 2010 novel, Bury Your Dead.

== Legacy ==
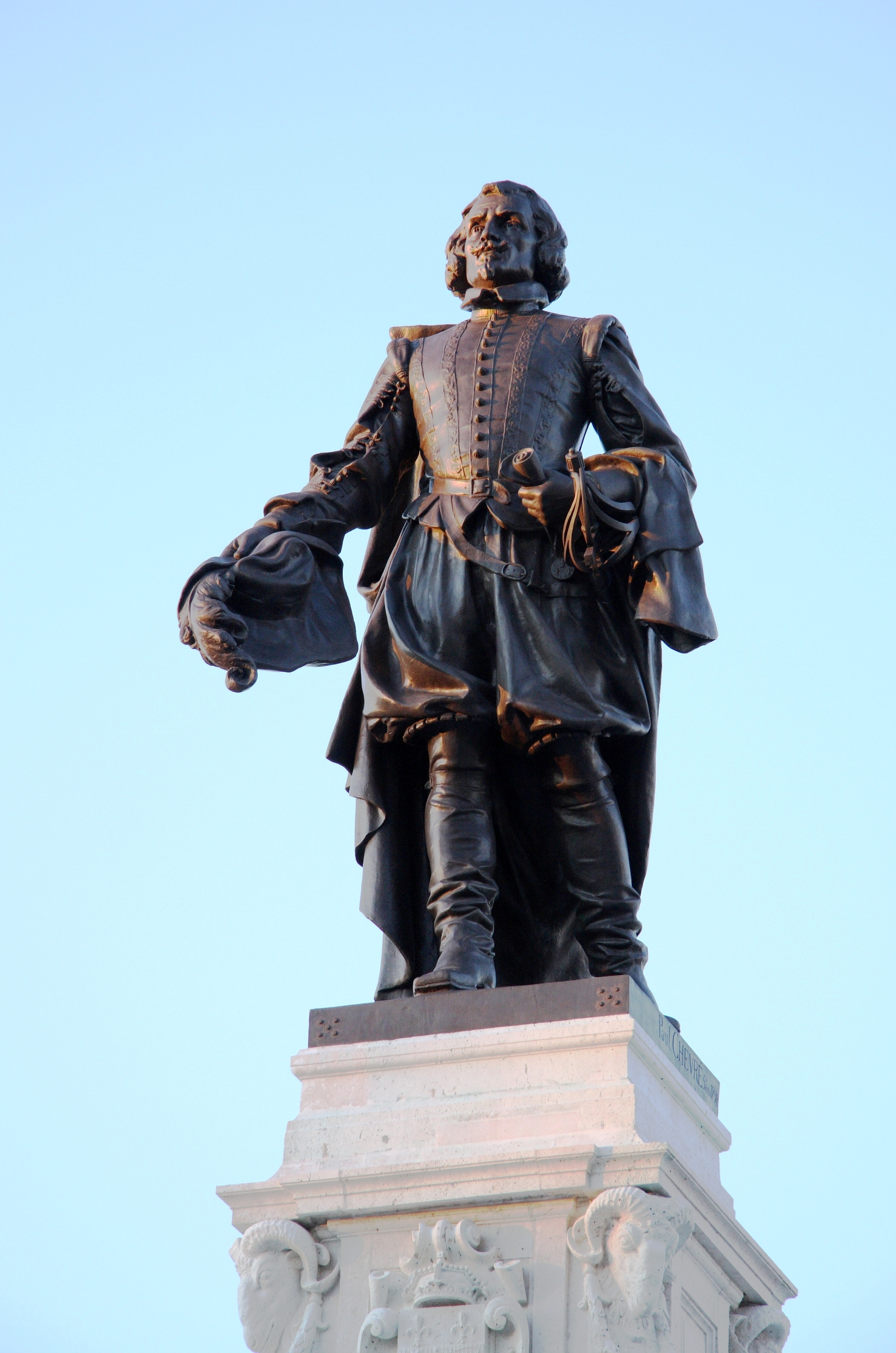
Statue of Samuel de Champlain at sunrise (looking to the north-west; with a similar expressive face as traditionally Jacques Cartier's), by Paul-Romain Marie Léonce Chevré (Paris, 1896–1898), as newly repaired for 2008, at Quebec City since 1898, near Château Frontenac grand hotel, on the Terrasse Dufferin.

Many sites and landmarks have been named to honour Champlain, who was a prominent figure in many parts of Acadia, Ontario, Quebec, New York, and Vermont. Memorialized as the "Father of New France" and "Father of Acadia", his historic significance endures in modern times. Lake Champlain, which straddles the border between northern New York and Vermont, extending slightly across the border into Canada, was named by him, in 1609, when he led an expedition along the Richelieu River, exploring a long, narrow lake situated between the Green Mountains of present-day Vermont and the Adirondack Mountains of present-day New York. The first European to map and describe it, Champlain claimed the lake as his namesake.

Memorials include:

- Lake Champlain, Champlain Valley, the Champlain Trail Lakes.
- Champlain Sea: a past inlet of the Atlantic Ocean in North America, over the St. Lawrence, the Saguenay, and the Richelieu rivers, to over Lake Champlain, which inlet disappeared many thousands years before Champlain was born.
- Champlain Mountain, Acadia National Park – which he first observed in 1604.
- A town and village in New York, as well as a township in Ontario and a municipality in Quebec.
- The provincial electoral district of Champlain, Quebec, and several defunct electoral districts elsewhere in Canada.
- Samuel de Champlain Provincial Park, a provincial park in northern Ontario near the town of Mattawa.
- Champlain Bridge, which connects the island of Montreal to Brossard, Quebec across the St. Lawrence.
- Champlain Bridge, which connects the cities of Ottawa, Ontario and Gatineau, Quebec.
- Champlain College, one of six colleges at Trent University in Peterborough, Ontario, is named in his honour.
- Fort Champlain, a dormitory at the Royal Military College of Canada in Kingston, Ontario; named in his honour in 1965, it houses the 10th cadet squadron.
- A French school in Saint John, New Brunswick; École Champlain, an elementary school in Moncton, New Brunswick and one in Brossard; Champlain College, in Burlington, Vermont; and Champlain Regional College, a CEGEP with three campuses in Quebec.
- Marriott Château Champlain hotel, in Montreal.
- Streets named Champlain in numerous cities, including Quebec, Shawinigan, the city of Dieppe in the province of New Brunswick, in Plattsburgh, and no less than eleven communities in northwestern Vermont.
- A garden called Jardin Samuel-de-Champlain in Paris, France.
- A memorial statue on Cumberland Avenue in Plattsburgh, New York on the shores of Lake Champlain in a park named for Champlain.
- A memorial statue in Saint John, New Brunswick, Canada in Queen Square that commemorates his discovery of the Saint John River.
- A memorial statue in Isle La Motte, Vermont, on the shore of Lake Champlain.
- The lighthouse at Crown Point, New York features a statue of Champlain by Carl Augustus Heber.
- A commemorative stamp issue in May 2006 jointly by the United States Postal Service and Canada Post.
- A statue in Ticonderoga, New York, unveiled in 2009 to commemorate the 400th anniversary of Champlain's exploration of Lake Champlain.
- A statue in Orillia, Ontario at Couchiching Beach Park on Lake Couchiching. This statue was removed by Parks Canada, and is not likely to be returned, as it incorporated offensive depictions of First Nations peoples.
- HMCS Champlain (1919), a S class destroyer that served in the Royal Canadian Navy from 1928 to 1936.
- HMCS Champlain, a Canadian Forces Naval Reserve division based in Chicoutimi, Quebec since activation in 1985.
- Champlain Place, a shopping centre located in Dieppe, New Brunswick, Canada.
- The Champlain Society, a Canadian historical and text publication society, chartered in 1927.
- A memorial statue in Ottawa at Kìwekì Point, by Hamilton MacCarthy. The statue depicts Champlain holding an astrolabe (upside-down, as it happens). It did previously include an "Indian Scout" kneeling at its base. In the 1990s, after lobbying by Indigenous people, it was removed from the statue's base, renamed and placed as the "Anishinaabe Scout" in Major's Hill Park.

== Written works ==
These are works that were written by Champlain:

- Brief Discours des Choses plus remarquables que Sammuel Champlain de Brouage a reconneues aux Indes Occidentalles au voiage qu'il en a faict en icettes en l'année 1599 et en l'année 1601, comme ensuite (first French publication 1870, first English publication 1859 as Narrative of a Voyage to the West Indies and Mexico 1599–1602)
- Des Sauvages: ou voyage de Samuel Champlain, de Brouages, faite en la France nouvelle l'an 1603 (first French publication 1604, first English publication 1625)
- Voyages de la Nouvelle-France (first French publication 1632)
- Traitté de la marine et du devoir d'un bon marinier (first French publication 1632)

Government offices
Preceded by Cardinal Richelieu	Lieutenant General of New France; 1632–1635	Succeeded by Charles de Montmagny as Governor of New France
