= Tabagie (feast) =

Tabagie is a Mi'kmaq word, often found in historical descriptions of solemn feasts in Quebec and Maritime Canada. A tribal unit would call a tabagie to observe a solemn event, such as (but not limited to) the imminent death of a senior tribal member. The term is also found in The Voyages of Samuel De Champlain, as Algonquins prepare to "put to death their prisoners in a festive tabagie". On 27 May 1603, a solemn tabagie or "feast" held at Tadoussac "reunited the Frenchmen Gravé du Pont and Champlain with the Montagnais, the Algonquins, and the Etchimins," and marked the beginning of an enduring alliance between these peoples. The term may be derived from tabac (tobacco), which was smoked as an essential element of the ceremony of the feast.

== See also ==
- Tabagie (room)
