= Tabagie (room) =

Room designated for smoking tobacco

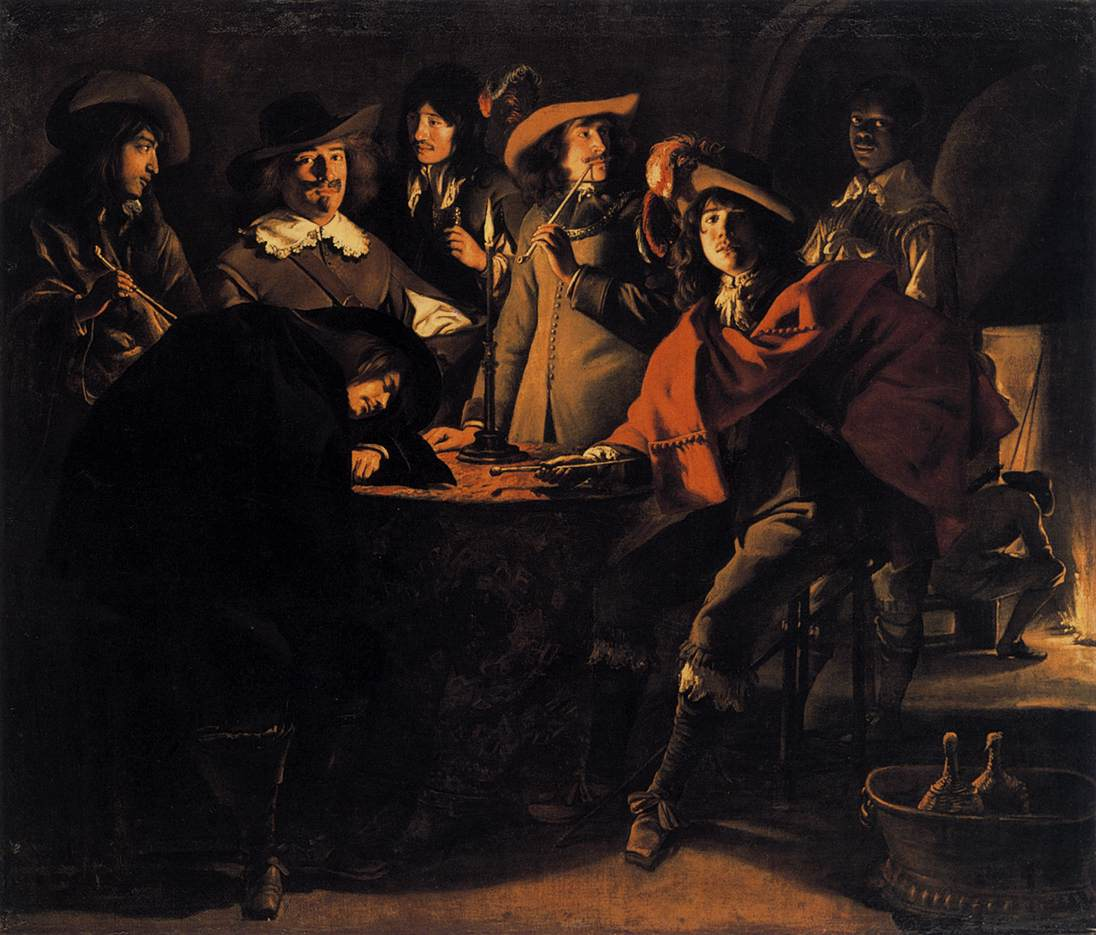
Smokers in an Interior (La tabagie, dit aussi Le corps de garde), 1643

A tabagie is a room designated for smoking tobacco and socializing.

In every Palace was a Tabagie, a high large room with a dozen contented saturnine figures round a large long table, a long Dutch pipe in the mouth of each.

In modern Quebec French, tabagie refers to a tobacco shop, which in Parisian French is called a bureau de tabac.

== See also ==
- Tabagie (feast)
