= Aymar de Chaste =

French admiral

Aymar de Chaste (1514–1603) was a Catholic French admiral during the Franco-Spanish Wars between 1582 and 1598.

A gentleman of the King's Chamber, François Aymar (or Aimar) de Cleremont de Chaste served as governor of Dieppe and Arques-la-Bataille as well as the French ambassador to England during mid to late 16th century. A vice admiral, Chaste commanded the French-Portuguese naval forces supporting António, Prior of Crato's attempt to defend the Azores from Spain to use as a staging point to liberate Portugal. However, he was defeated by Álvaro de Bazán, Marquis of Santa Cruz at the Battle of Terceira in 1583.

After agreeing to command an expedition to the Saint Lawrence River with former officers Pierre Dugua, Sieur de Mons, François Gravé Du Pont, and Samuel Champlain, Chaste was appointed Viceroy of Canada by King Henry IV on February 6, 1602. Chaste would preside over New France as lieutenant governor later forming the "Canada and Acadia Trading Company", which would eventually establish French domination of the North American fur trade for more than a decade, overseeing the company until his death in 1603, shortly before this first expedition return to France.
