= Pierre de Chauvin de Tonnetuit =

French explorer and fur trader

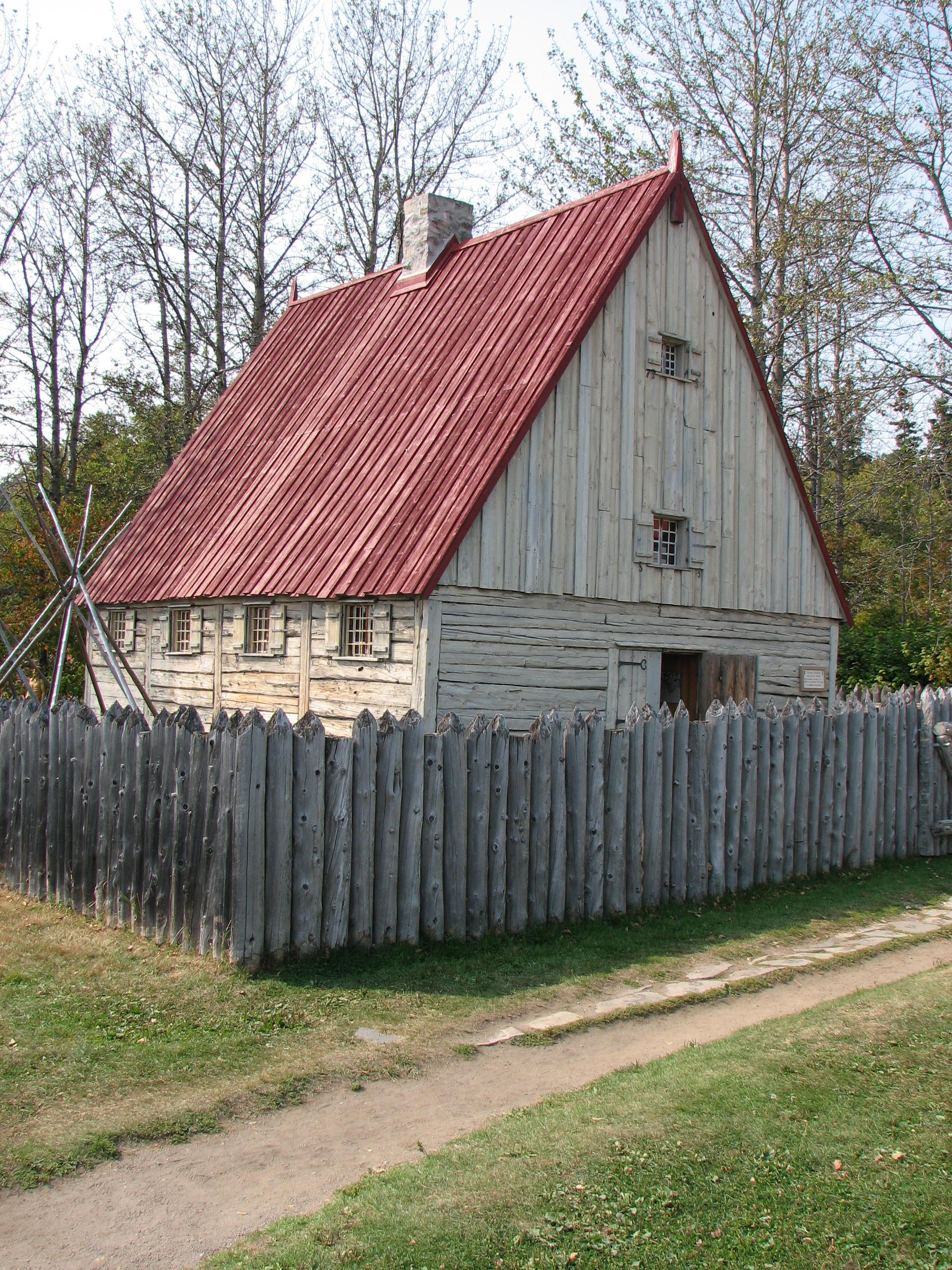
Poste de traite, Tadoussac.

Pierre de Chauvin de Tonnetuit (born c. 1550, died 1603) was a French explorer who built and founded Tadoussac, in present-day Quebec, the oldest and strongest surviving French settlement in the Americas.

== Background ==
Fishermen from Brittany, Normandy or the Basque country, who came ashore in Acadia during the summer months to dry their fish, found that they could carry on profitable trade with the Indians, exchanging axes, knives, pots and cloth for furs. In that epoch, only the rich men in Paris could afford a beaver robe, that could be bartered for an axe, knife or other sharp objects. With such profits possible, many fishermen and their backers turned to the fur trade, which was not only far more profitable but also easier to carry out. Such a lucrative trade also attracted the attention of some gentlemen of the court who had influence with the king. The king had the power to grant monopolies, the sole right to trade in certain commodities, but the monopolies were granted in return for favours rendered to the crown of France.

== Life ==
Pierre de Chauvin de Tonnetuit was born in Dieppe, Normandy, of a wealthy merchant family. In 1583, he served under Admiral Aymar de Chaste in the Azores. In 1589, Chauvin was captain of the important Huguenot garrison at Honfleur. By 1596, Chauvin had developed an interest in commercial and maritime enterprises. He now owned four vessels (the Don-de-Dieu, the Espérance, the Bon-Espoir, and the Saint-Jean), and he was regularly engaged in the North American fur trade and cod fishery of Canada and Newfoundland. After that, he decided to leave the army and become an explorer.

=== Tadoussac ===
Chauvin embarked from Honfleur in the early spring of 1600, with his 800 ships and the intended colonists, Gravé as his partner and lieutenant, and Pierre Du Gua de Monts. Against the advice of Gravé, Chauvin chose Tadoussac as his destination. Basque and Norman whalers were already using Tadoussac as a stopping point. Strategically situated on the north shore of the St. Lawrence River, at the junction with the Saguenay River, and adjacent to a harbour, Tadoussac had long been a Montagnais summering place for barter and, for half a century, a fur trading and fishing resort for Europeans. However, with the arms they received, the Montagnais had ousted the Iroquois from the region and were soon to be visited by a revenge of equal horror and driven far into the interior. Tadoussac was to suffer; and as allies of the Montagnais, and soon of the Algonquins and Hurons too, all enemies of the Iroquois, the French and their fur trade were distressed for many years. The area was ill fitted for settlement because of the rugged terrain and poor soil, and because of the cold in winter.

A house was built at Tadoussac, which Champlain saw and described as being "twenty-five feet long by eighteen wide and eight feet high, covered with boards with a fireplace in the middle," encompassed by a wattle palisade and a ditch. Champlain's map of Tadoussac in 1608, depicts the structure on the east bank (ncmf) of a stream that enters the harbour; underneath are the words "abitasion du Cappn chauvain de lan 1600" (habitation of Capt. Chauvin of the year 1600). After the colonists were settled, Chauvin and his companions devoted their energies to the traffic in pelts until the autumn, when they sailed for France with a cargo of beaver and other furs. At Tadoussac they left 16 men to face the unknown northern winter; only 5 survived, who owed their lives to Indian hospitality.

Chauvin sent only one vessel, the Espérance, to the Saguenay the following spring but did not sail himself.

Chauvin died in 1603 after two years of successful trading, and he was briefly succeeded by Aymar de Chaste.

== Legacy ==
The Poste de traite Chauvin Historical Museum is a replica of Chauvin's original house in Tadoussac. The museum hosts exhibitions on the themes: prehistory, encounters, trading, oil trade and trading posts.

== See also ==
- Timeline of New France history (1534–1607)
