= Major's Hill Park =

Park in Ottawa, Ontario, Canada

Coordinates: 45.427311°N 75.697496°W

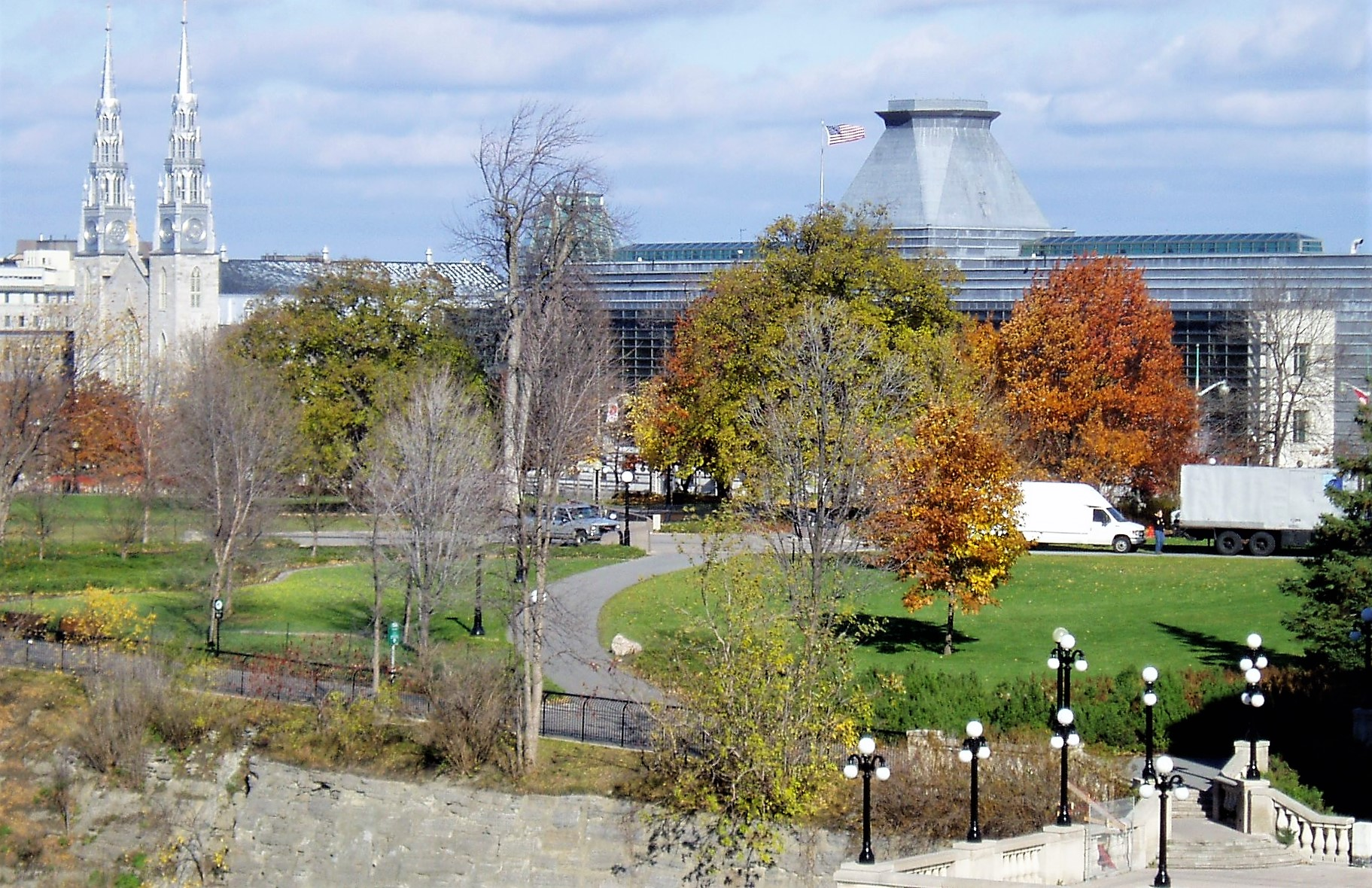
Major's Hill Park with the Notre-Dame Cathedral Basilica at left and the huge American Embassy in the background

Major's Hill Park is a park in downtown Ottawa, Ontario. The park stands above the Rideau Canal at the point where it enters the Ottawa River. The parliament buildings can be seen across the canal to the west, to the north of the park is the National Gallery of Canada, and to the east are the United States embassy and the Byward Market. To the south is the Chateau Laurier hotel, built on land that was once part of the park.

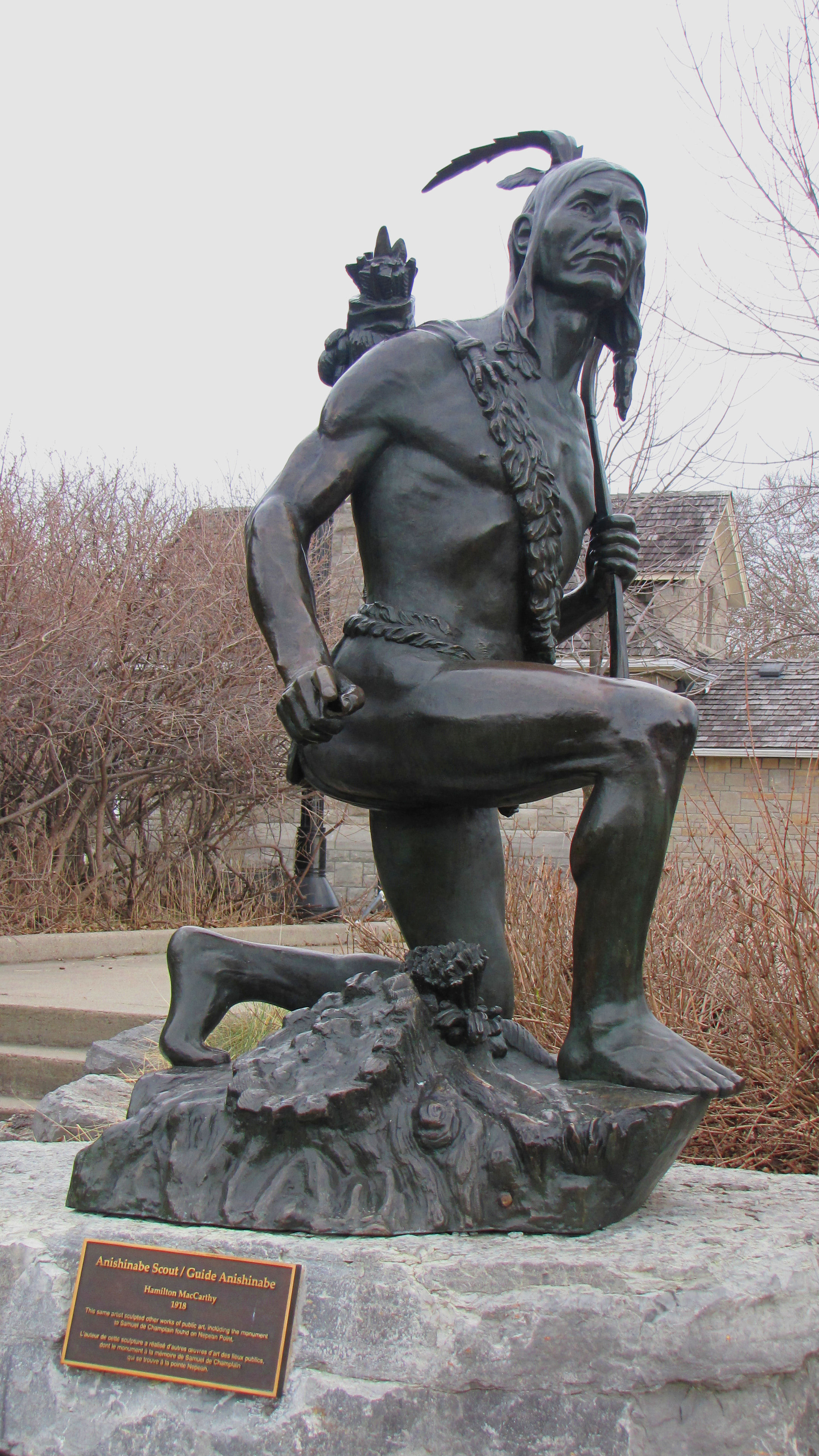
Anishinaabe Scout by Hamilton MacCarthy

The neighbourhood surrounding the park was once home to those who constructed the canal. In particular, the area that is now the park was the official residence of the Superintending Engineer of the Rideau Canal, Lieutenant-Colonel John By until he returned to England in 1832. The hill was known at the time as "Colonel's Hill". By was replaced in 1832 by Captain Daniel Bolton who took up residence in By's house. In 1838 Bolton was promoted to Major. By the time he left the Bytown in 1843, the hill had become known as Major's Hill. Commemorative plaques and a statue of Lieutenant-Colonel By, Major Bolton and their successors were erected in Major's Hill Park.

The residence was destroyed by fire on October 5, 1848, though ruins survive to today. The use of the area as a residence means that the park has remained a green space since the early days of Ottawa. It is now managed by the National Capital Commission, which has placed historical information in the northwest corner of the park.

Due to its central location, Major's Hill Park is frequented all year round. It is frequently used as a venue for events, and is central to Ottawa's civic Canada Day celebrations. A more recent addition to the calendar is the annual 'B In The Park', which precedes the Glengarry Highland Games. Pipe bands and highland dancers from all over the world perform. It is presented by the Sons of Scotland Pipe Band of Ottawa, which claims to be Canada's oldest continuous civilian pipe band.

== Evolution of the park ==
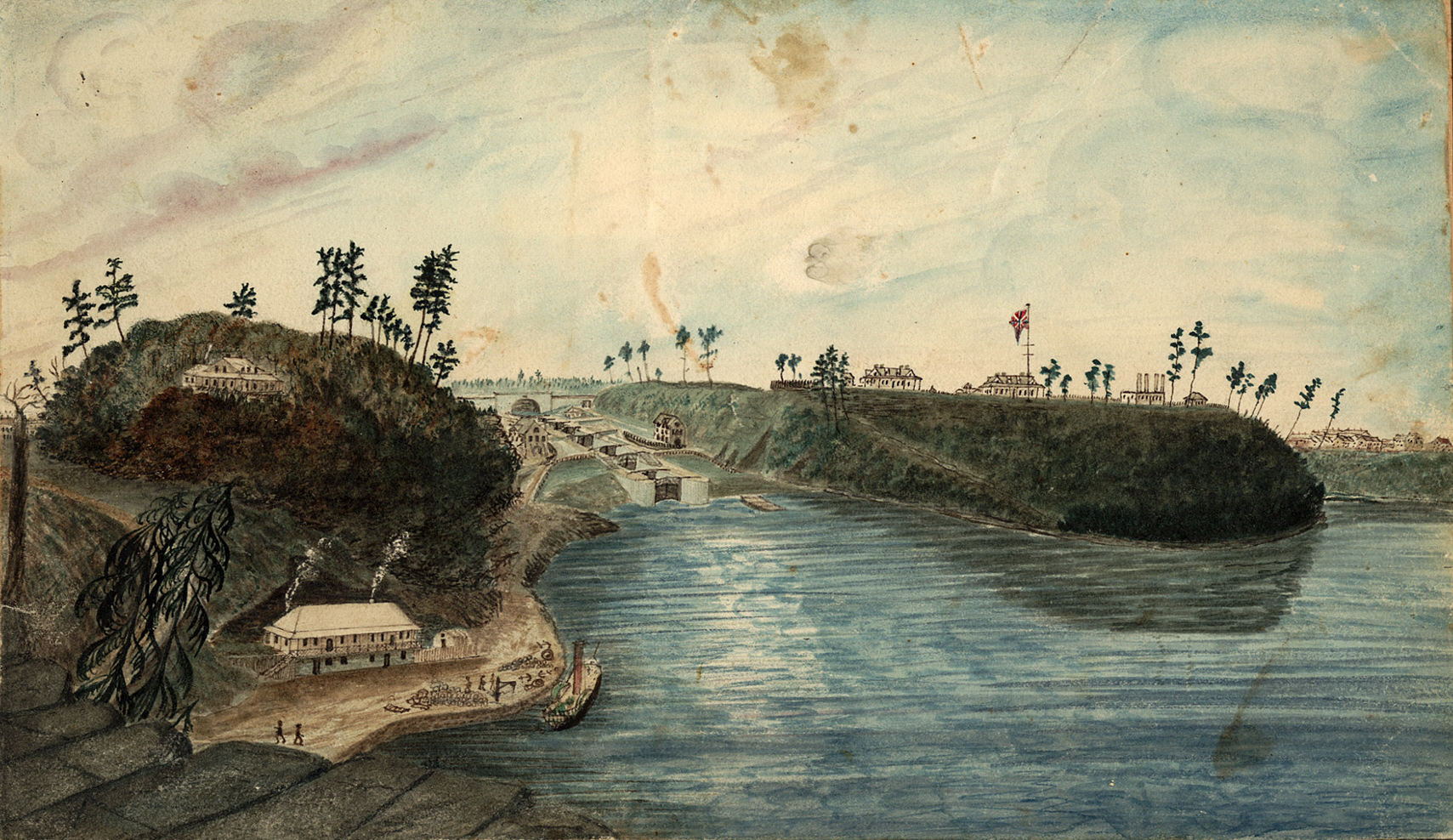
An 1834 view of the canal locks. Colonel's Hill, with numerous trees, and Colonel By's residence are at the left of the image.

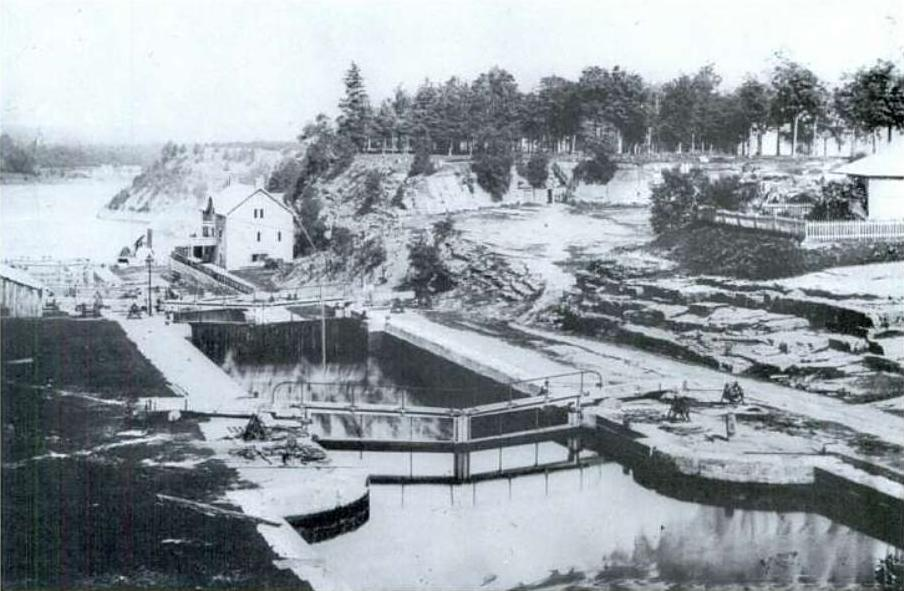
Major's Hill and the locks in 1861; the lockmaster's house (partially visible on the right side of the image) was demolished when Major's Hill became a park in 1876.

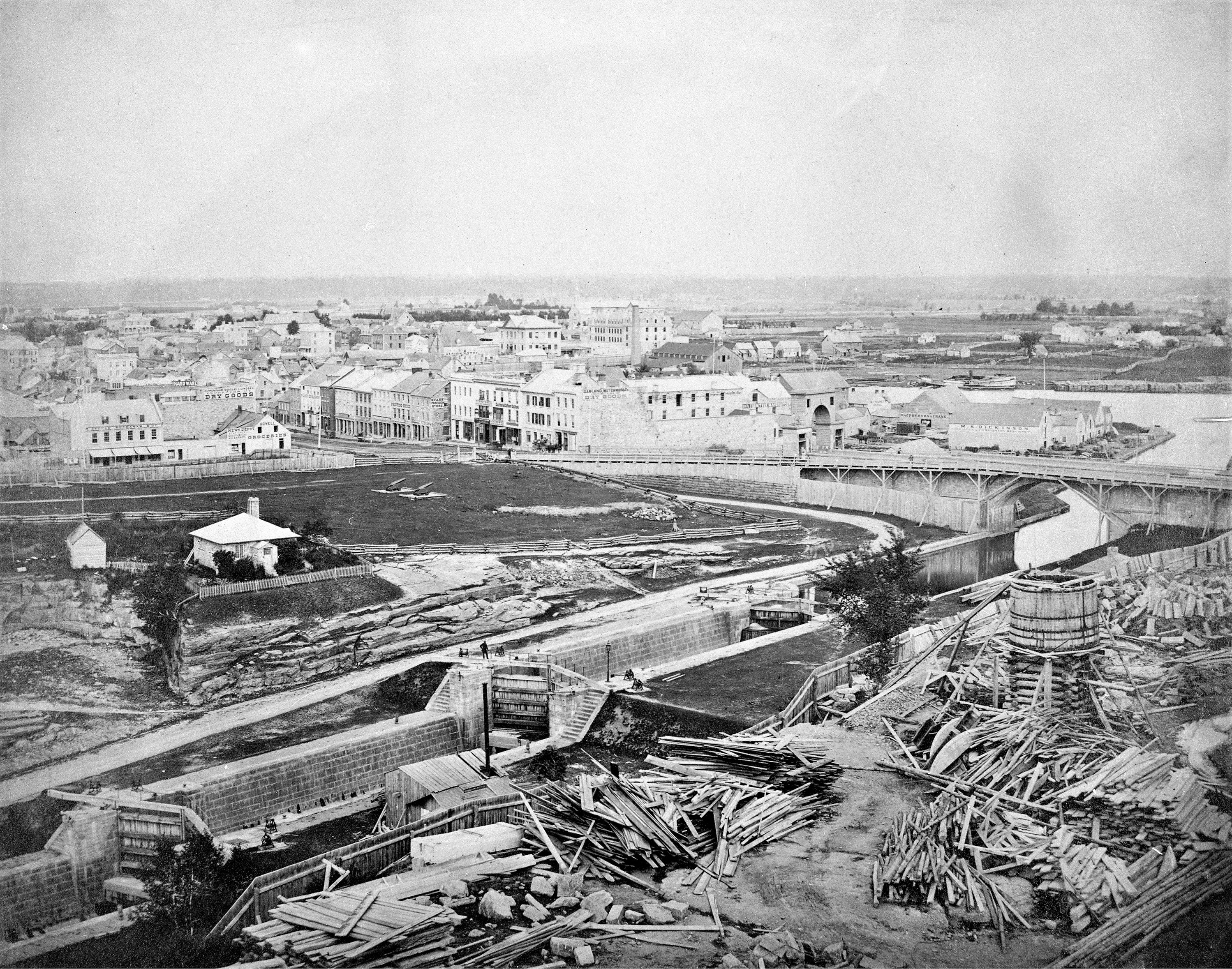
View of the south end of Major's Hill from Parliament Hill, circa 1860s; by this time, trees were cleared from all but the northern portion of Major's Hill.

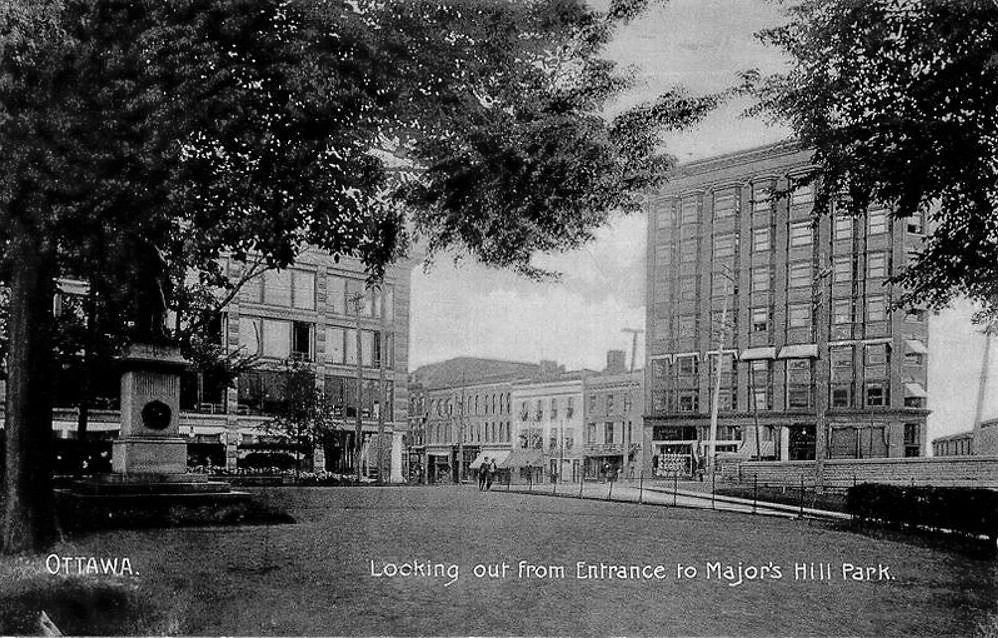
The south end of Major's Hill in 1909, when the park extended to Rideau Street and the Château Laurier had not yet been built.

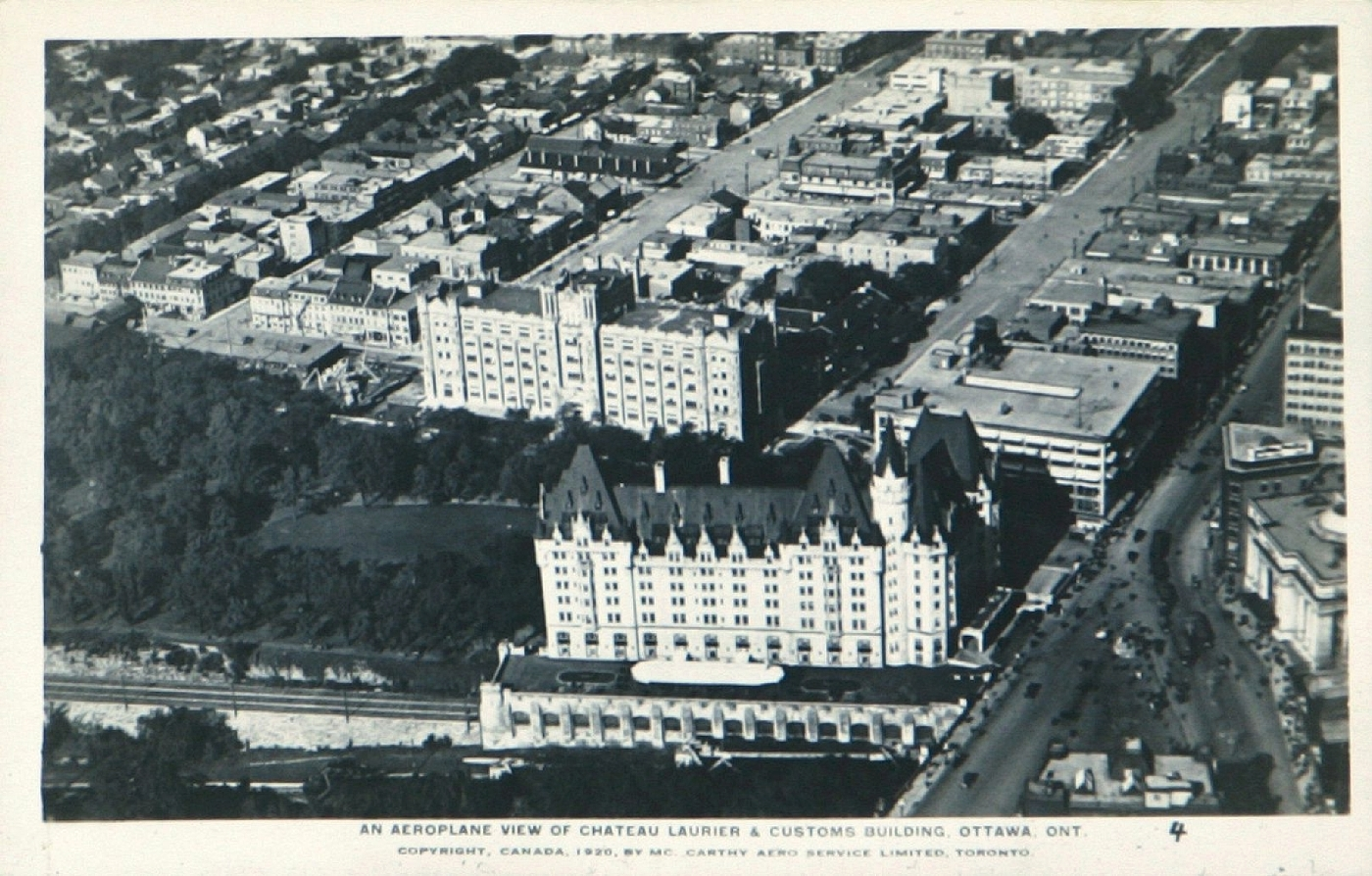
Aerial view from 1920; the federal government had permitted the construction of the Château Laurier on the south end of Major's Hill in 1909-12.

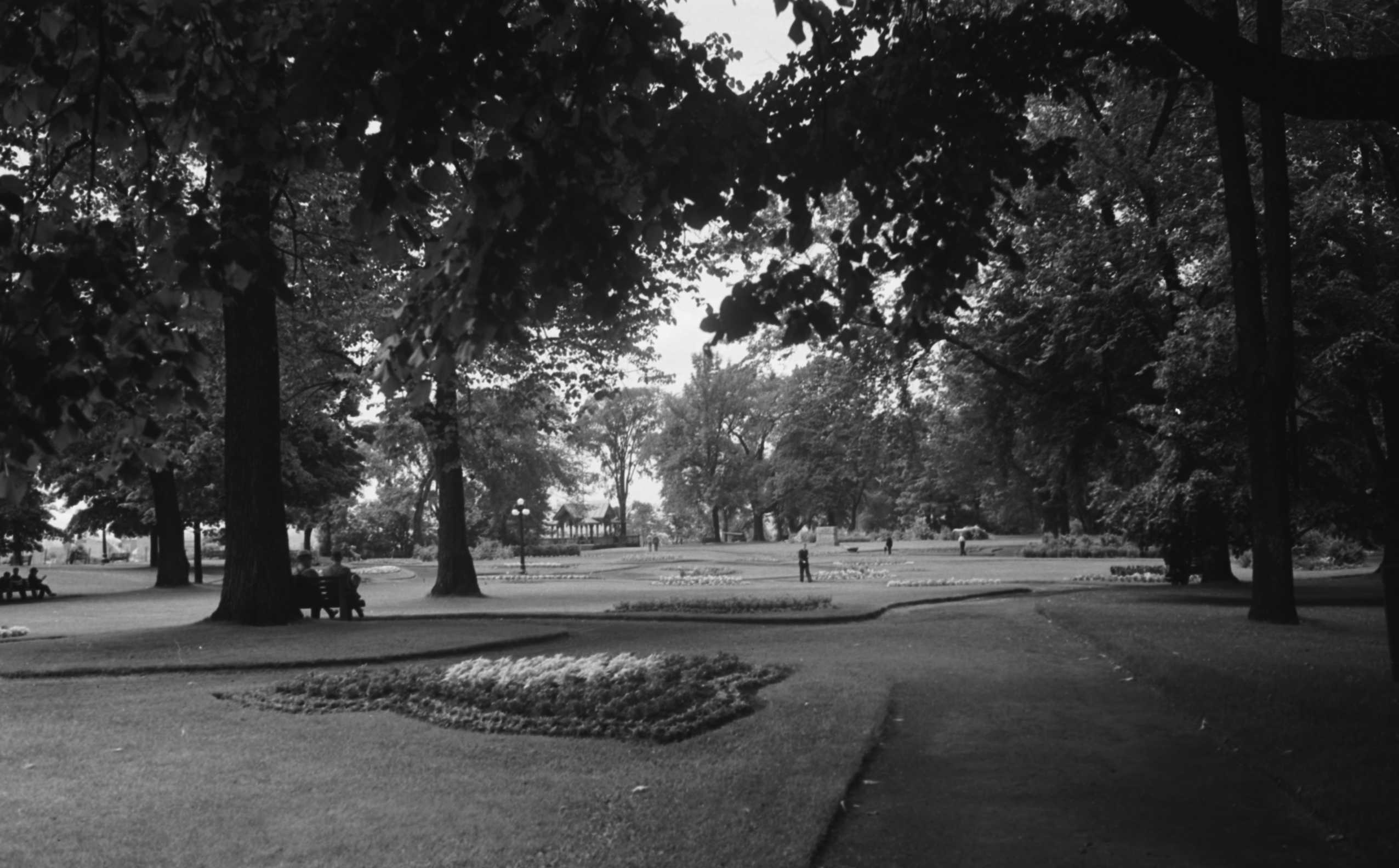
By 1938, Major's Hill had been developed as a well-manicured urban park.

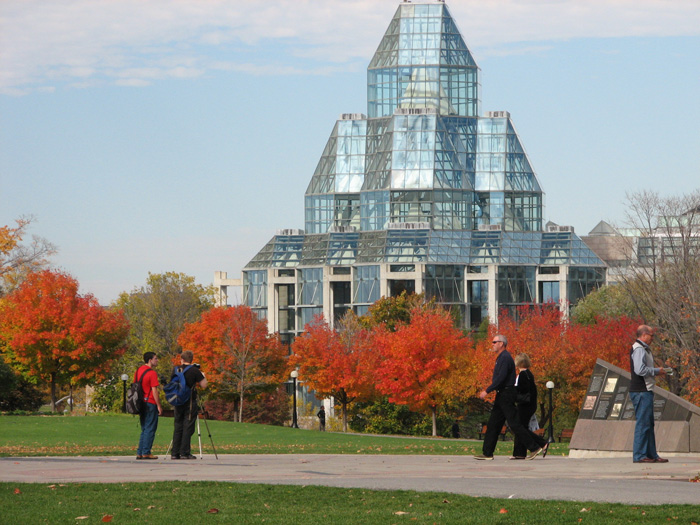
Since 1988, the north end of Major's Hill has been framed by the new National Gallery of Canada building.
