= Tadoussac =

Village in Quebec, Canada

- Village municipality
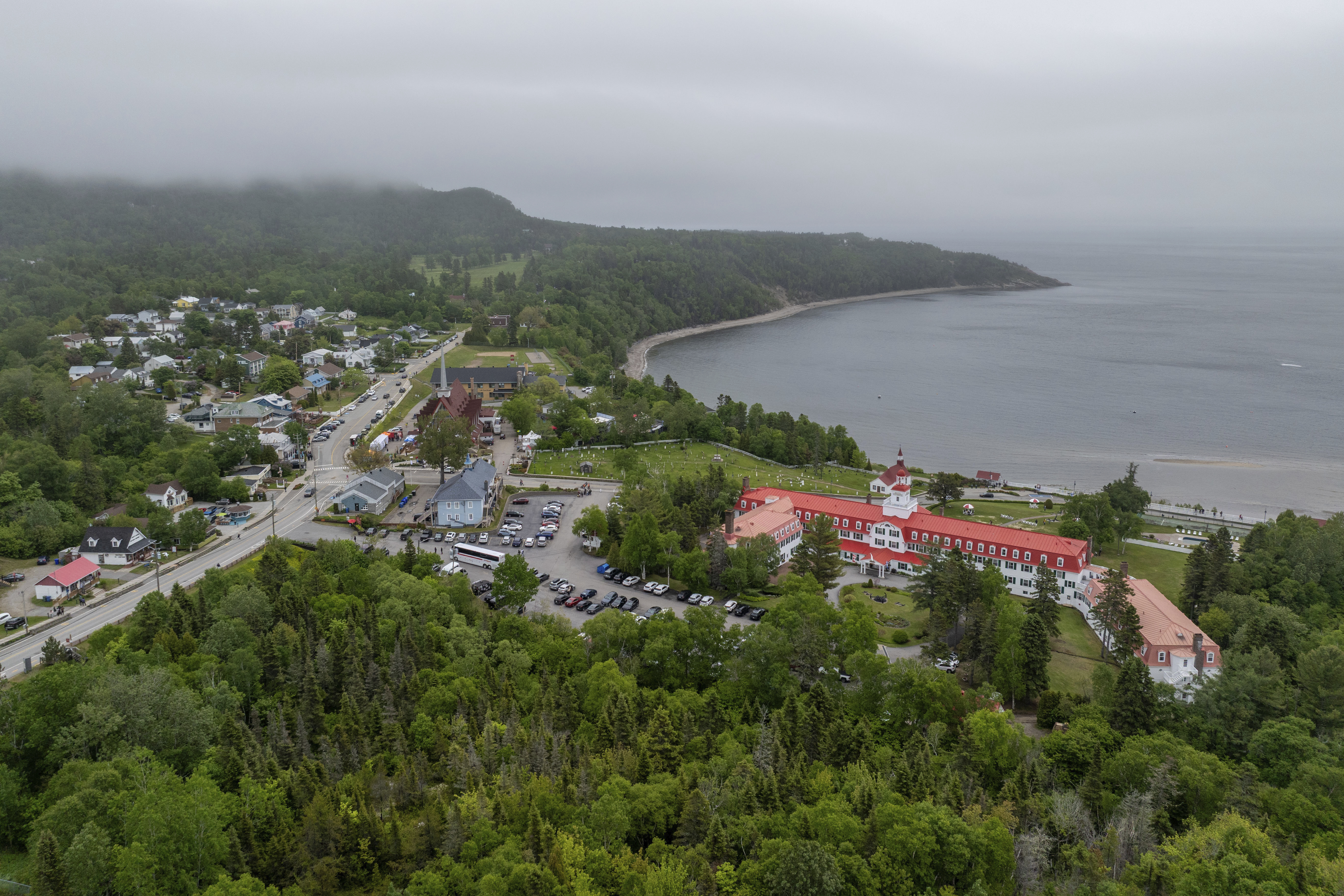
- Tadoussac in 2026

- Coat of arms

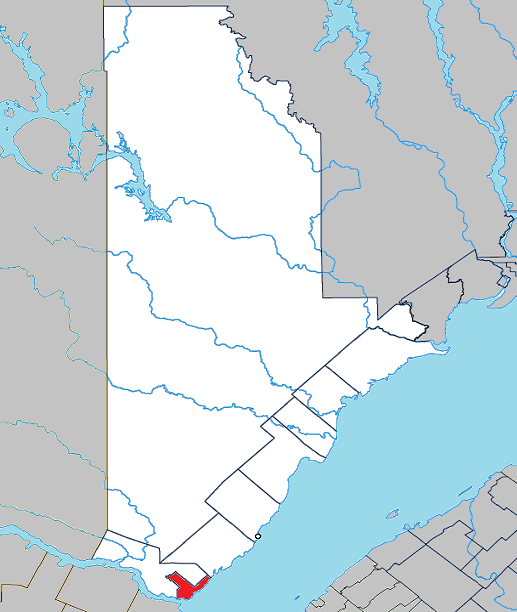
- Location within La Haute-Côte-Nord RCM

- Location in the Côte-Nord region of Quebec
- Coordinates: 48°09′N 69°43′W
- Country: Canada
- Province: Quebec
- Region: Côte-Nord
- RCM: La Haute-Côte-Nord
- Settled: 1599
- Constituted: October 10, 1899

Government
  - Mayor: Richard Therrien
  - Federal riding: Côte-Nord—Kawawachikamach—Nitassinan
  - Prov. riding: René-Lévesque

Area
  - Total: 200.11 km^{2} (77.26 sq mi)
  - Land: 52.73 km^{2} (20.36 sq mi)

Population (2021)
  - Total: 814
  - Density: 15.4/km^{2} (40/sq mi)
  - Pop (2016–21): ▲1.9%
  - Dwellings: 514
- Time zone: UTC−05:00 (EST)
  - Summer (DST): UTC−04:00 (EDT)
- Postal code: G0T 2A0
- Area codes: 418 and 581
- Highways: R-138 R-172
- Website: www.tadoussac.com

Tadoussac (French pronunciation: [tadusak]) is a village municipality in La Haute-Côte-Nord RCM (Regional County Municipality), on the north shore of the maritime section of the estuary of St. Lawrence river, in Côte-Nord region, Quebec, Canada.

== Geography ==
Tadoussac is located in a bay on the north shore of the lower estuary of the St. Lawrence River, at the mouth of the Saguenay River fjord. Tadoussac offers a backdrop of mountains, water, rock and greenery. The village municipality is a point of convergence between the Côte-Nord, Saguenay-Lac-Saint-Jean and Charlevoix.

The entire area is either rural or still in a wilderness state, with several federal and provincial natural parks and preserves nearby which protect natural resources. Tadoussac encompasses the first marine national park of Canada. The nearest urban agglomeration is Saguenay about 100 kilometres (62 mi) west.

== History ==
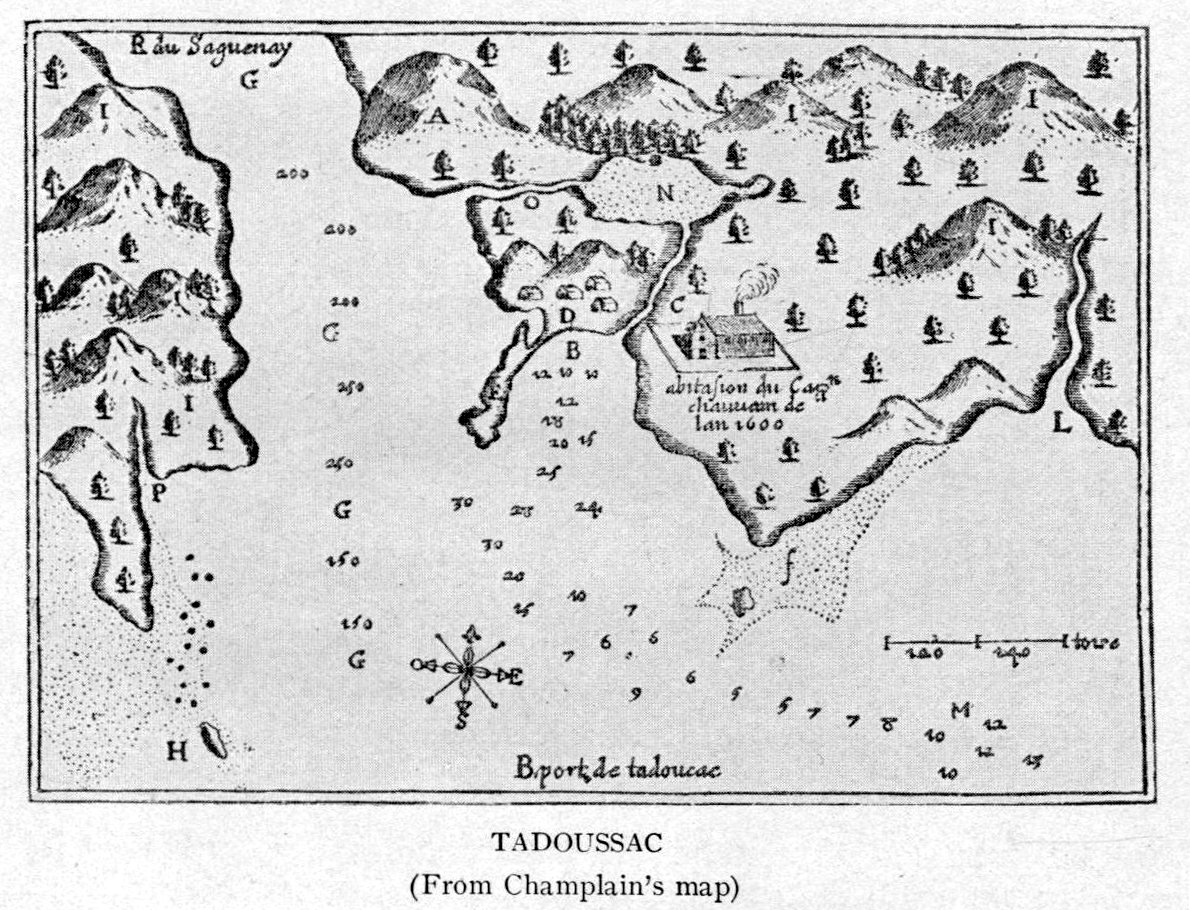
Tadoussac in about 1612, illustrated by Samuel de Champlain

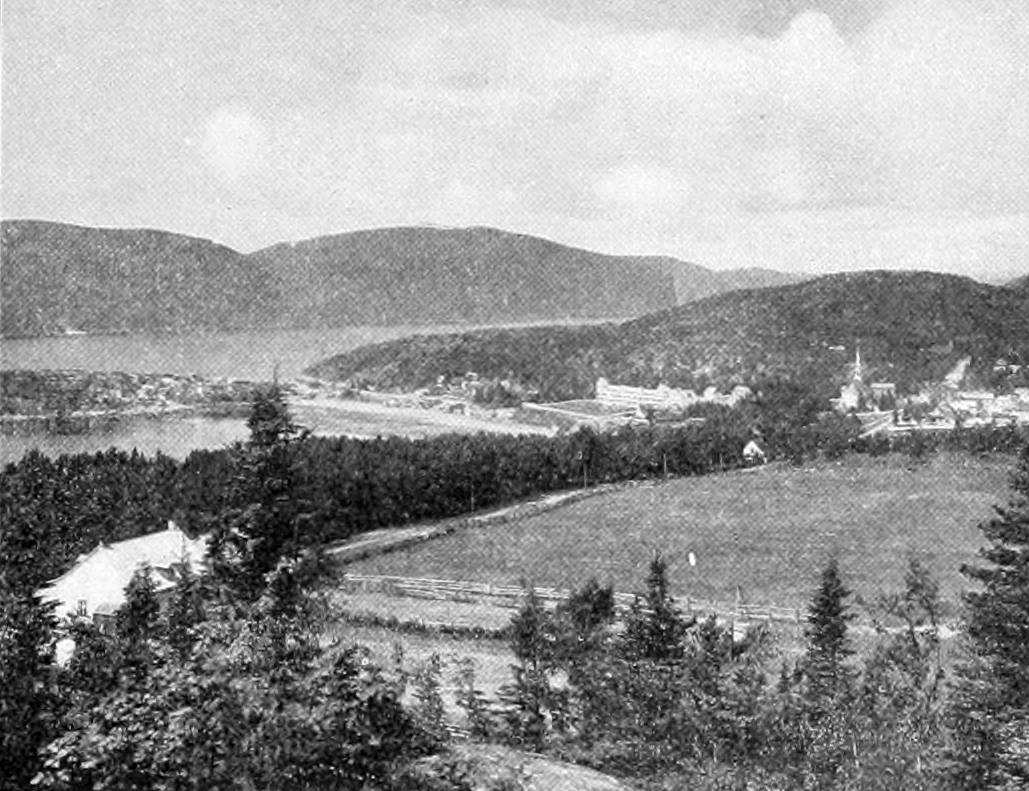
Tadoussac, 1900

Jacques Cartier came to the site in 1535 during his second voyage. He found Innu people using it as a base for hunting seal. Later that same century, Basques conducted whaling expeditions on the river, as well as engaging in hides trade with the natives based in the shore at the mouth of the Saguenay. By the end of the 16th century, more than a thousand Algonquin, Etchimin, and Montagnais gathered at Tadoussac every summer to trade furs with Europeans. The first nations quickly learned not to trade with the first ship arriving, but to wait until several competing ships would drive up the prices of their furs. According to historian Bruce Trigger, the area was the "most important fur-trading centre in North America" by 1600.

Tadoussac was founded in 1599 by François Gravé Du Pont, a merchant, and Pierre de Chauvin de Tonnetuit, a captain of the French Royal Navy, when they acquired a fur trade monopoly from King Henry IV. Gravé and Chauvin built the settlement on the shore at the mouth of the Saguenay River, at its confluence with the St. Lawrence, to profit from its location. But the frontier was harsh and only five of the initial sixteen settlers survived the first winter. In 1603, the tabagie or "feast" of Tadoussac reunited Gravé with Samuel de Champlain and with the Montagnais, the Algonquins, and the Etchimins." In 1615, the Mission of L'Exaltation-de-la-Sainte-Croix-de-Tadoussac, named in memory of a cross planted by Jean de Quen, was founded by the Récollet Order. Their missionary brothers sang the first Mass there two years later.Tadoussac remained the only seaport on the St. Lawrence River for 30 years. Colonists from the Tadoussac area were involved in whaling from 1632 until at least the end of the century.

Historians believe the St. Lawrence Iroquoians, who inhabited the St. Lawrence valley upriver to the west, were defeated and pushed out by the Mohawk before the early 17th century. By the late 17th and early 18th century, Tadoussac was the centre of fur trade between the French and First Nations peoples. Competition over the fur trade increased among the nations. In 1720, the trading post became part of the King's Domain Posts. Between 1762 and 1786, it was operated by Dunn, Gray and Murray.

In 1802, the North West Company obtained the lease on the trading posts in the King's Domain. When the North West Company (NWC) and the Hudson's Bay Company (HBC) merged in 1821, it was operated by the HBC for one year until the original NWC lease expired. The renewal of the 20-year lease was awarded to John Goudie, the highest bidder, but in 1831, the HBC reacquired the King's Posts by buying the lease from William Lampson. The Tadoussac post (also called Totoushack) was the administrative headquarters for all the King's Posts until 1849, when the headquarters were relocated to Ile Jérémie. Due to a decline in the fur trade, Tadoussac became just a summer fishing post in 1851. In 1859, the HBC sold the salmon fishery, including its ice house and store, and ceased operations in Tadoussac.

In 1855, the geographic township of Tadoussac was established. In 1899, it was incorporated as a village municipality. In 1937, the Parish Municipality of Tadoussac was formed, but dissolved in 1949 because it had less than 500 inhabitants. With industrialization reaching other parts of Canada, tourists discovered the appeal of this rural village. Wealthy Québécois built a number of vacation villas. A Victorian hotel called the Hotel Tadoussac was built in 1864; it was expanded around 1900 and demolished in 1942, and replaced by a newer Hotel Tadoussac.

=== Contemporary ===
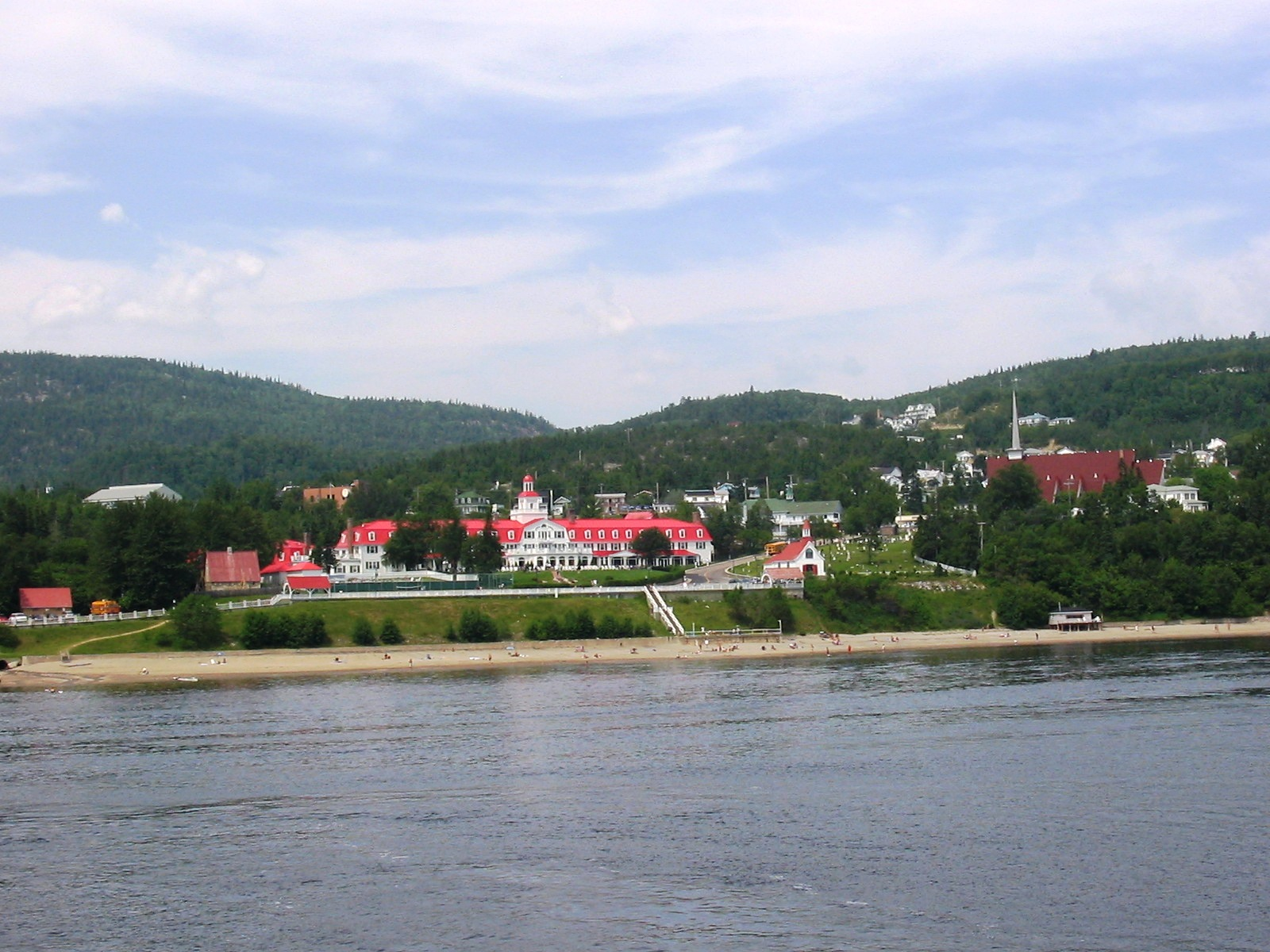
Tadoussac as seen from the St. Lawrence

The modern village of Tadoussac lies close to the site of the original settlement at the mouth of the Saguenay River. It is known as a tourist destination because of the rugged beauty of the Saguenay fjord and its facilities for whale watching. The authority for the Port of Tadoussac was transferred in April 2012 to the Municipality of Tadoussac.

== Demographics ==
According to the 2021 census conducted by Statistics Canada, Tadoussac had a population of 814 living in 397 of its 514 total private dwellings, a change of 1.9% from its 2016 population of 799. With a land area of 52.73 km^{2} (20.36 sq mi), it had a population density of 15.4/km^{2} (40.0/sq mi) in 2021.

Historical census populations – Tadoussac

Year	Pop.	±%
1921	470	—
1931	644	+37.0%
1941	766	+18.9%
1951	1,064	+38.9%
1956	1,066	+0.2%
1961	1,083	+1.6%

Year	Pop.	±%
1966	1,059	−2.2%
1971	1,010	−4.6%
1976	998	−1.2%
1981	900	−9.8%
1986	838	−6.9%
1991	832	−0.7%

Year	Pop.	±%
1996	913	+9.7%
2001	870	−4.7%
2006	850	−2.3%
2011	813	−4.4%
2016	799	−1.7%
2021	814	+1.9%

Population counts are not adjusted for boundary changes.
Source: Statistics Canada

Mother tongue (2021):

- English as first language: 1.8%
- French as first language: 95.7%
- English and French as first language: 0%
- Other first language: 1.2%

== Local government ==
List of former mayors:

- Pierre Marquis (...–2009)
- Hugues Tremblay (2009–2017)
- Charles Breton (2017–2021)
- Richard Therrien (2021–present)

== Tourism and attractions ==
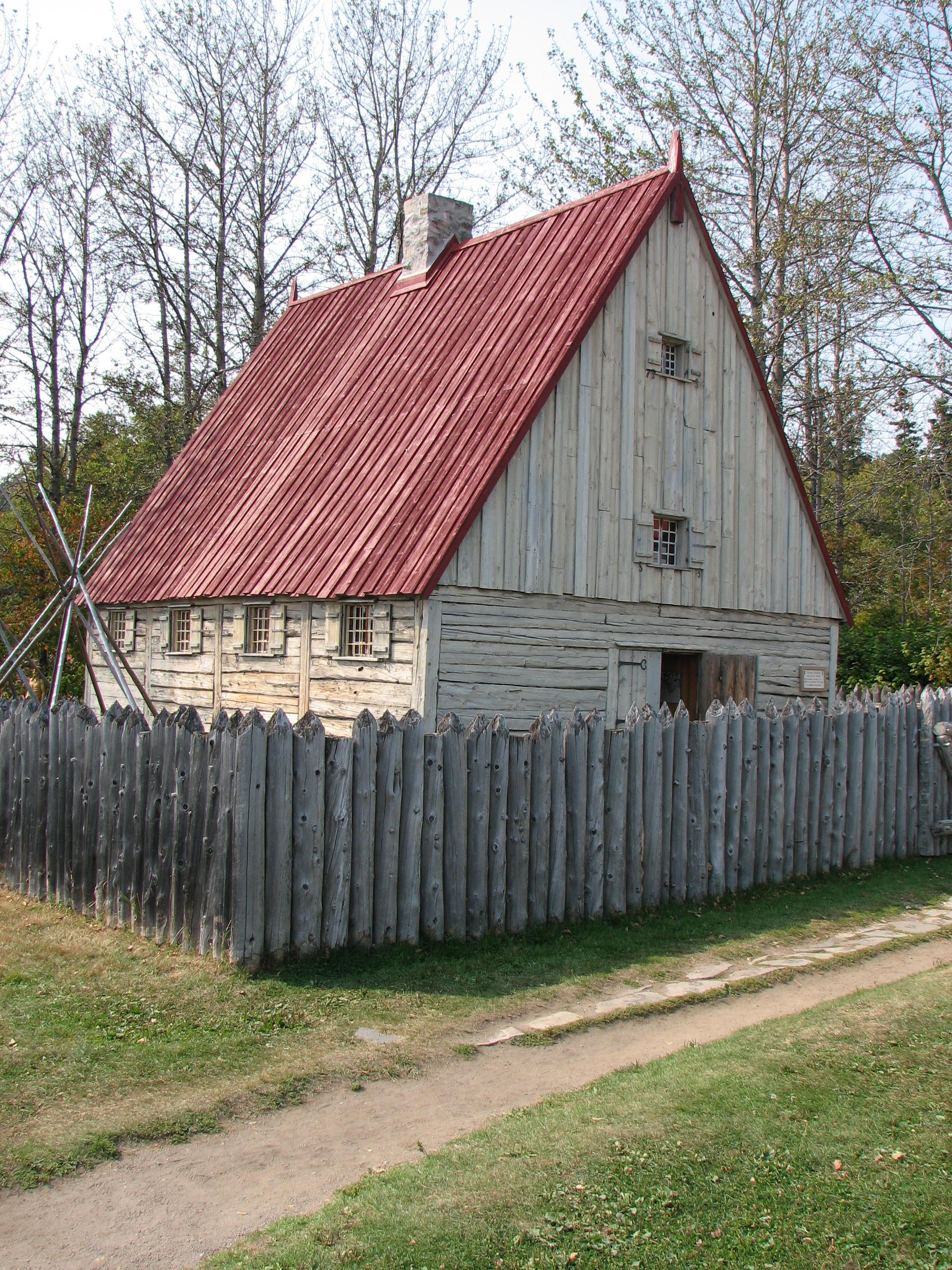
Reconstructed trading post in Tadoussac

- Trading post of Pierre Chauvin
- CIMM (Centre d'interprétation des mammifères marins), Center of Marine Mammal Interpretation
- Whale watching excursions in the Saguenay–St. Lawrence Marine Park
- Club de Golf Tadoussac

== Transportation ==
Tadoussac is the north-east terminus of the Baie-Sainte-Catherine/Tadoussac ferry which offers free and frequent service across the Saguenay River. The ferry is part of Quebec Route 138 and the main link to Sept-Îles. The village is considered the gateway to the Manicouagan region.

Bus service to and from Quebec City and Montreal is offered by Intercar, twice a day, seven days a week.

== In media ==
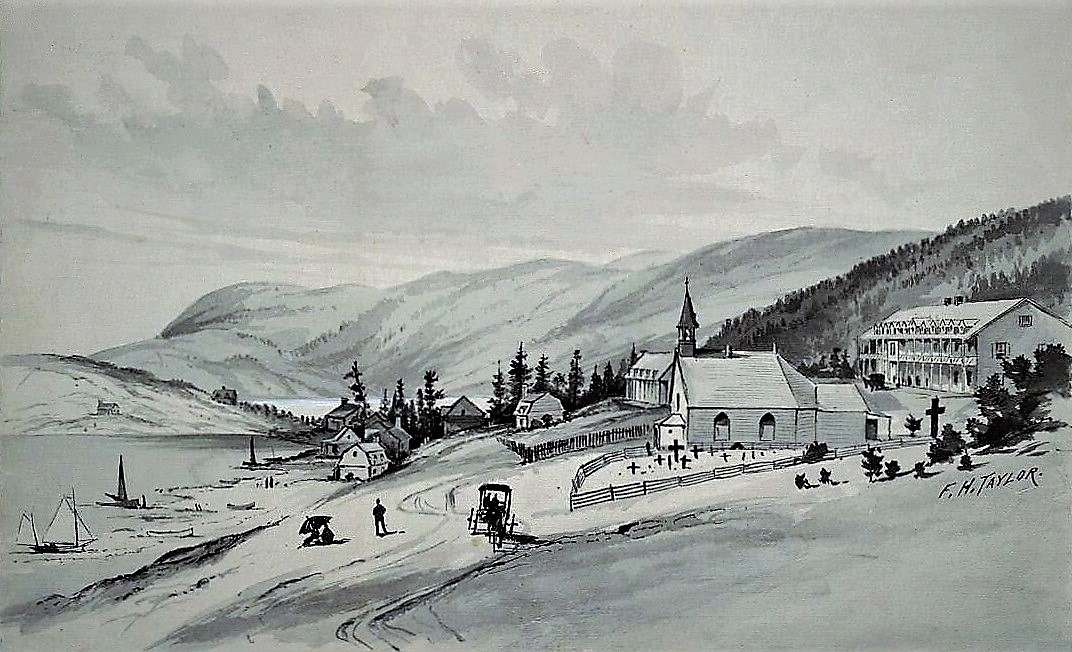
"Tadoussac, at the mouth of the Saguenay" by Frank Hamilton Taylor

- The film The Hotel New Hampshire, based on the 1981 John Irving novel of the same name, was shot at the Hotel Tadoussac and released in 1984.
- The introduction to the Goosebumps TV series was filmed in Tadoussac, with the Hotel Tadoussac visible in the background at the first scene.
- The 2017 movie Tadoussac directed by Martin Laroche features the main character moving to the town after wanting to abandon urban life.

== See also ==
- 1925 Charlevoix–Kamouraska earthquake
- List of village municipalities in Quebec
