= Riverport, Nova Scotia =

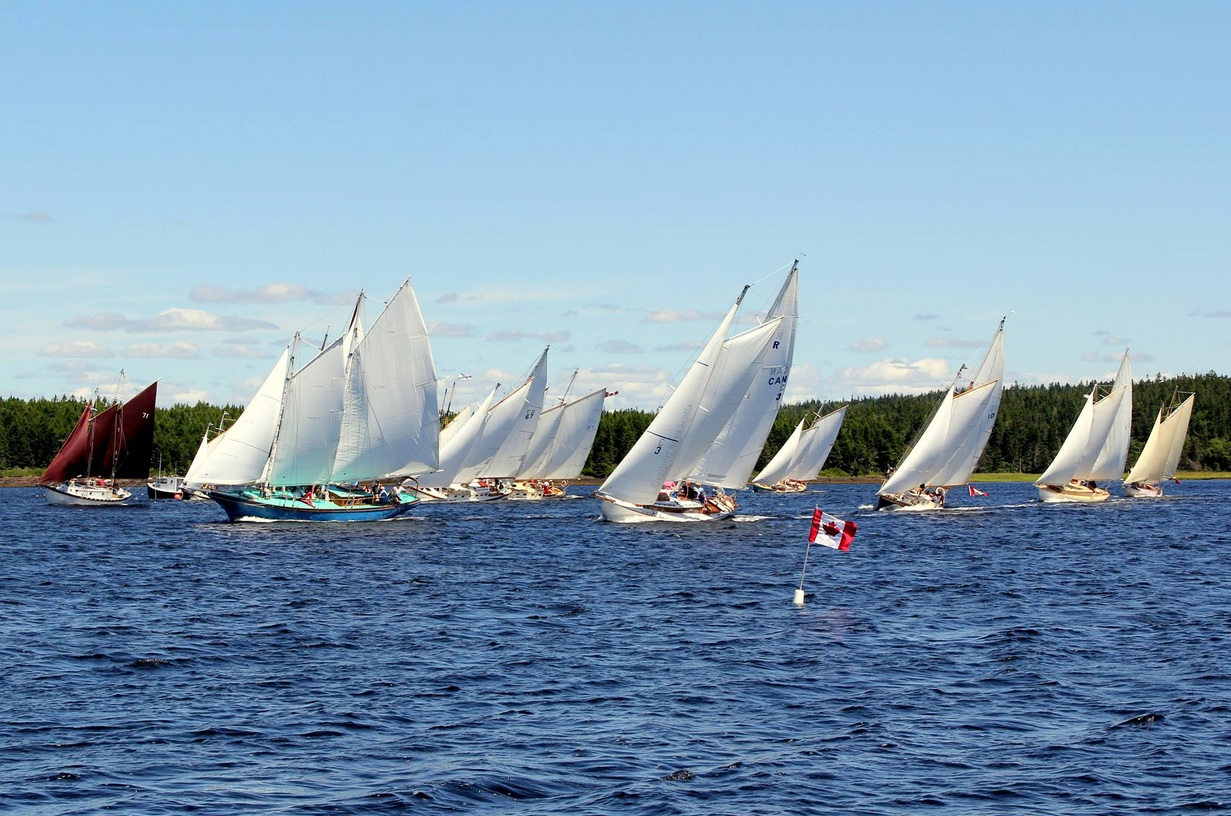
- Schooner race

- Location within Nova Scotia
- Coordinates: 44°17′40.0″N 64°19′39.0″W
- Country: Canada
- Province: Nova Scotia
- Municipality: Lunenburg Municipality
- Settled: 1754
- Elevation: 0 m (0 ft)
- Highest elevation: 119 m (390 ft)
- Lowest elevation: 0 m (0 ft)
- Time zone: UTC-4 (AST)
  - Summer (DST): UTC-3 (ADT)
- Canadian Postal code: B0J 2W0
- Area code: 902
- Telephone Exchanges: 764, 766
- NTS Map: 021A08
- GNBC Code: CBFUW
- Website: www.modl.ca

Riverport is a community in Lunenburg County, Nova Scotia, Canada. The harbour of Ritcey Cove is free from shoals and safe from every wind, considered one of the finest in North America. Riverport is a five-minute drive to several public beaches including Hirtle's Beach, Kingsburg Beach, Oxner Beach, Rose Bay Beach and Spindler Beach.

== Geography ==
Riverport is located approximately 120 kilometers from Halifax Regional Municipality, 20 kilometers from Bridgewater and 15 kilometers from Lunenburg and across the river from LaHave.

== History ==
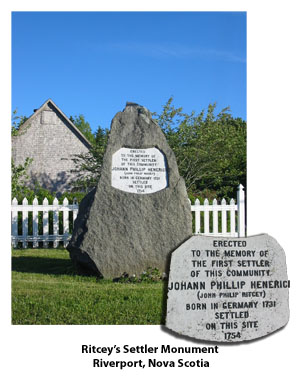
Ritcey Settler's Monument

One of the first European explorers to discover the area was Samuel De Champlain in 1604 as part of the LaHave settlement. Between 1632 and 1636, Commander Isaac de Razilly created the First Capital of New France on the western river shore, later Riverport would form on the eastern side. During this time Fort Ste. Marie de Grace housed the colony and cannons line.

In 1634, the governor of Acadia, Isaac de Razilly, wrote, “Bordeaux vines have been planted that are doing very well,” making the first mention of wine grape cultivation anywhere in Canada.

As time progressed forward to 1650, the eastern side of the LaHave River became known as Ance aux Huitres or Oyster Cove. This was also one of Sir Nicholas Denys' headquarters and fishing stations, he having arrived at LaHave, Nova Scotia with de Racily. As business and government spending slowed, the French usage of the area slowed, as the capital at Port-Royal, Nova Scotia and other settlements near Saint John, New Brunswick grew. From 1654 to 1667, after a devastating conflict between duelling Acadian governors d'Aulnay and La Tour (who shared a wife, Jeanne Moutin, who effectively ruled Acadia throughout married first to d'Aulnay and then La Tour) , the Denys brothers (Nicholas and Simon) moved from the area to the north.

A century later, under British rule, Foreign Protestants arrived for settlement in Halifax in 1749 to 1752.

=== Ritcey's Cove ===
Ritcey's Cove began as 30 acre land lots issued for settlement which began in 1754 by the original Foreign Protestants settlers. One of the original settlers in this community was Johann Phillip Henericie. Through time and language practices traditional German language adapted to local market requirements and eventually adapted to English. Over the years, the "Henericie" name became known as "Ritcey" and Ritcey's Cove.

As Ritcey's Cove grew and other communities such as Kingsburg, Feltzen South and Middle LaHave influenced Ritcey's Cove, local families including Creaser, Smith, Oxner, Himmelman, Conrad, Mosher and Zinck families made a name change necessary. Simon Ritcey, direct descendant of Johann Phillip Henericie, chaired the meeting.

In 1902, "Riverport" and "Fairhaven" were the choices, the vote was tied and Riverport was chosen by the chairman's deciding ballot. In 1904, by an Act of Parliament, Ritcey's Cove was renamed to present day Riverport. Riverport's name was established by the people during the fourth year of Edward VII's reign.

Chapter 107 - An Act to change the name of a Settlement in the County of Lunenburg. (Passed the 3rd day of March, A.D. 1904.) Section. 1. Name changed. Be it enacted by the Governor, Council, and Assembly, as follows: - 1. The village of settlement in the county of Lunenburg heretofore known as Ritcey's Cove, shall hereafter be known and designated as Riverport.

=== Shipbuilding, sailing, and rum-running ===
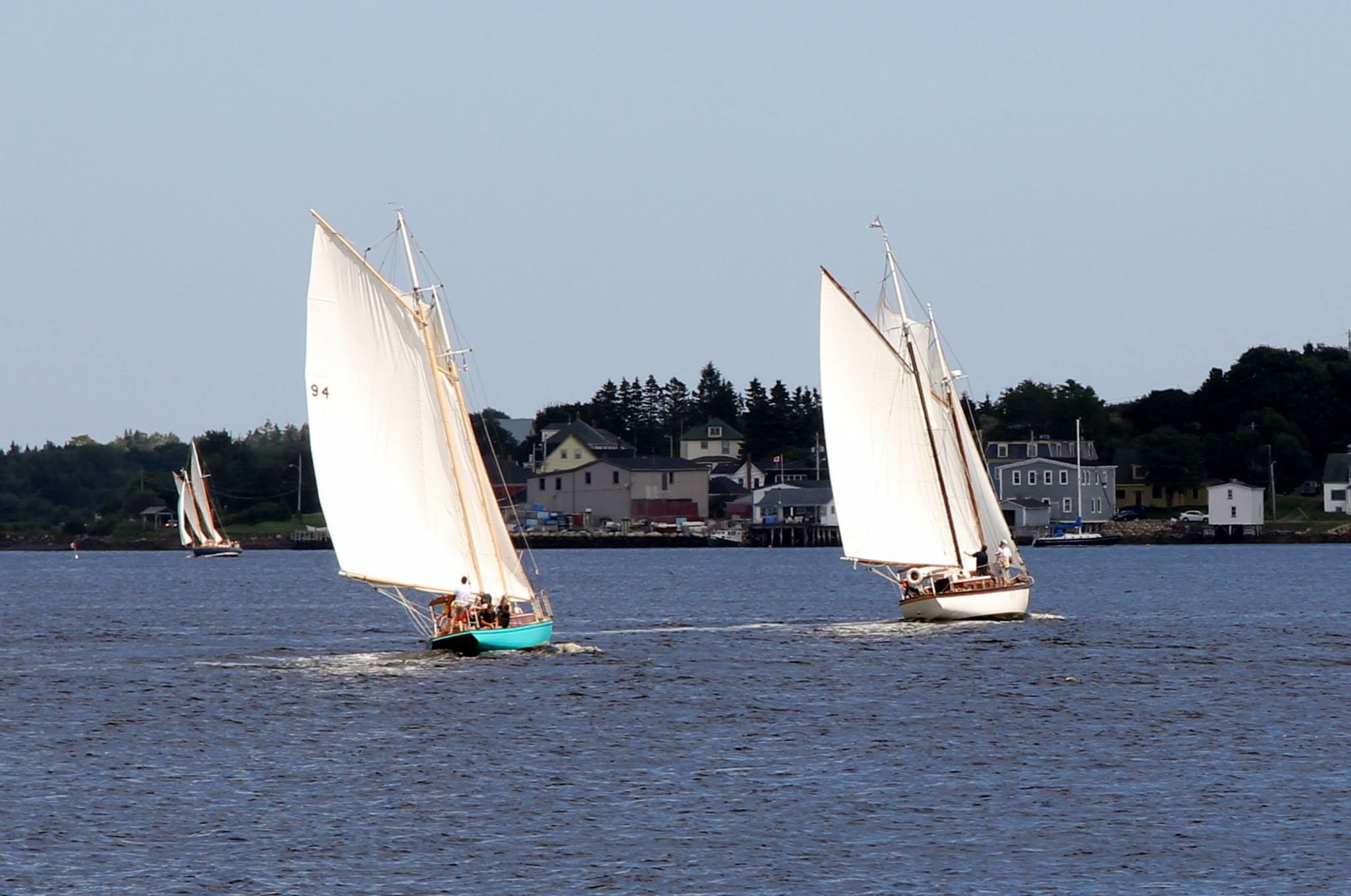
Nova Scotia Schooner Association Raceweek

From its location, ship building became an important industry in the early 1800s. In 1820, the settlers engaged in Labrador fishing and the first two vessels built for bank fishing including the "Valiant". In 1910 there was a fleet of 18 salt fishing schooners. This eventually increased to 28 including the Mona Marie and Delawana of the 1920 Canadian representative for the International Fisherman Vessel Championship. The following year the Bluenose was built and won the title of the International Fisherman Vessel Championship for the six annual races that were held.

One of the most majestic buildings in Riverport is the former Myrtle Hotel. This building is steeped with story and is a place that Al Capone was reputed to be a return visitor during Prohibition. Given secluded location, proximity to the ocean and the notable number of men from the community of Riverport involved in rum-running it is likely.

A century later, Covey Island Boatworks utilized their strategic space at Kraut Point to form the entire Bluenose II backbone of laminated ribs to start a new era of schooner history. Then followed up this project with the notable project building all ten spars, standing and running rigging, mast hoops for the replica iconic American Schooner Columbia, a noted competitor.

Nova Scotia Schooner Association Race Week has been a recent addition to the communities portfolio of events. In 2013, the Nova Scotia Schooner Association brought their event for three days to Riverport after 51 years of racing. The returning 2014 Nova Scotia Schooner Association Race Week was an even greater event as featured in Canadian Yachting Magazine.

On October 5, 2014, the Bridgewater Triathlon Club hosted the 9th Annual Riverport Duathlon, in Riverport, Nova Scotia - selected by Triathlon Nova Scotia as the 2014 Nova Scotia Provincial Duathlon Championship and by Triathlon Canada as a qualifying race for the 2015 World Duathlon Championships to be held in Adelaide, Australia. This is the only race east of Quebec to be afforded this honour.

== Economy ==
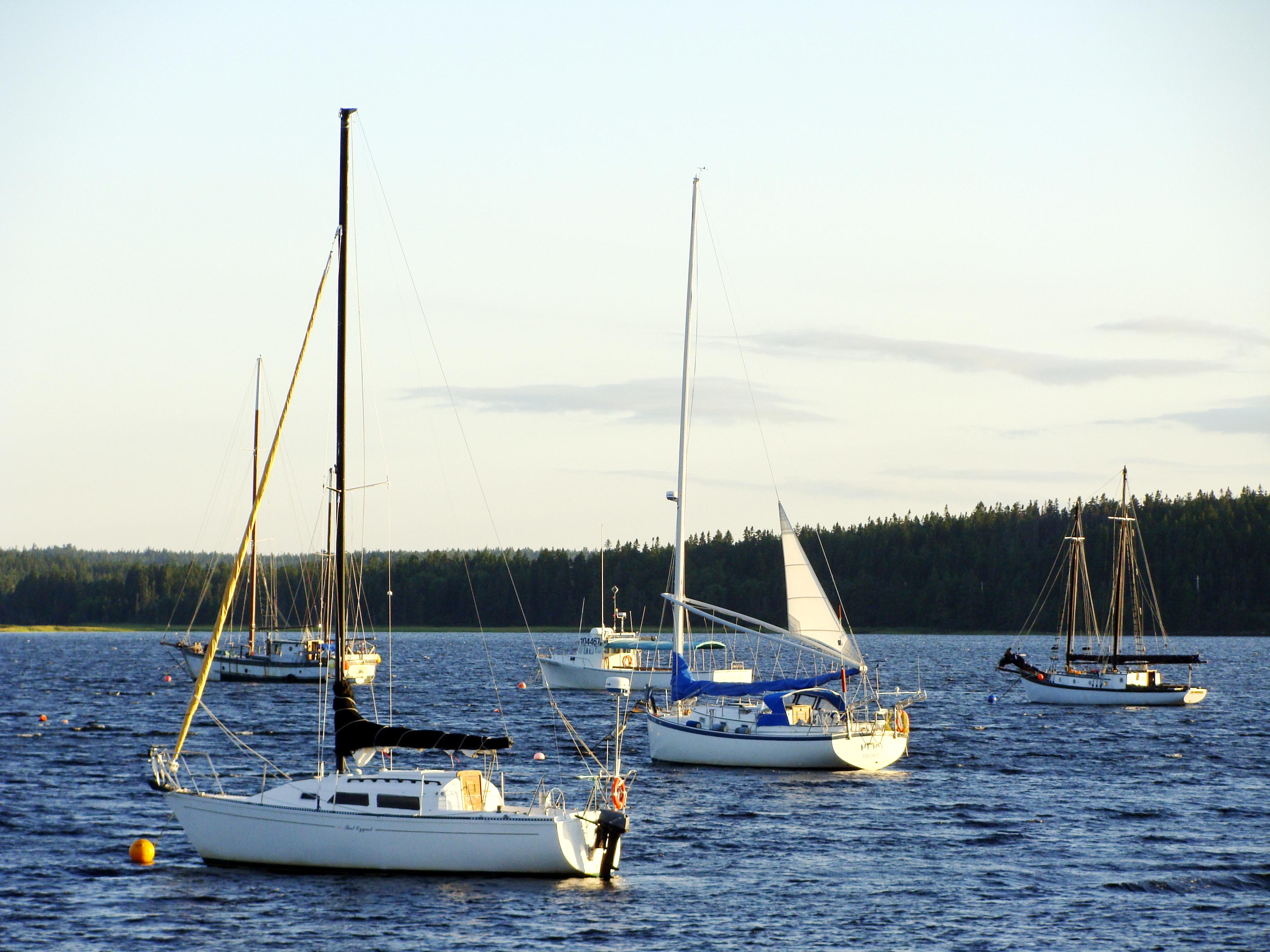
Creaser's Cove

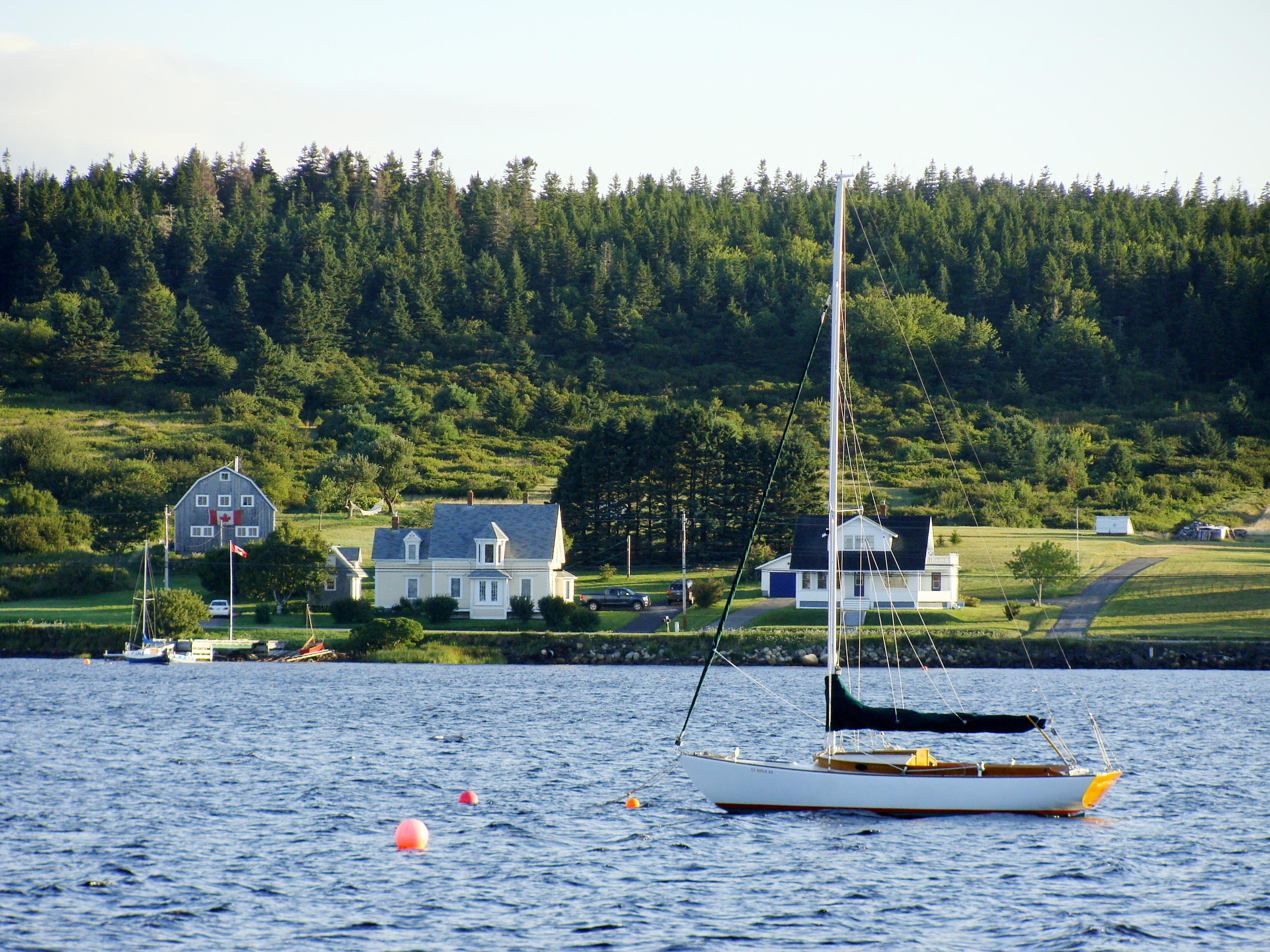
Ritcey's Cove

=== Electric grid ===
Unique to the area is the Riverport Electric Light Commission (RELC). In 1920, the RELC became the first municipally incorporated electric utility in Nova Scotia. Today the independent RELC is still the first of six power utilities independent of Nova Scotia Power, a subsidiary of Emera Incorporated, who co-operate in the Municipal Electric Utilities of Nova Scotia Cooperative Limited. A seventh community, Kentville, Nova Scotia, had sold its utility to NSPI at approximately the same time that MEUNSCL was formed, in 1997–98.

The vast of Lunenburg County that this utility covers is essentially the same size as the City of Halifax with a much less dense population. The communities serviced by RELC include Five Houses, Lower LaHave, East LaHave and Middle LaHave, Upper and Lower Rose Bay, Upper and Lower Kingsburg.

Unlike the nearby Lunenburg and Mahone Bay utilities, the other three (in Berwick, Antigonish, Canso and the former utility in Kentville, Riverport's is managed more like a utility cooperative, with commissioners from each constituent community. In the US, there are about 900 of these in rural areas, as compared to about 2000 where the grid is run by the local council. The Nova Scotia association has little formal function, as contrasted to very active associations of rural co-operatives, for example Kentucky's.

=== Marine ===
Lunenburg County boatbuilding is alive along the river anchored by Covey Island Boatworks based in Lunenburg, using the historical site of Kraut Point where local and international clients which uses the Riverport boat yard facilities to construct custom built yachts. Their boats are primarily constructed using laminated wood and epoxy techniques.

Some notable construction activities occurring at Covey Islands Boatworks Riverport facility included the forming of the ribs for the Canadian Schooner Bluenose II reconstruction and the masts for the replica iconic American Schooner Columbia.

Dagley's Boatworks in East LaHave also builds and repairs vessels along with several more smaller builders.

=== Real estate ===
The real estate market has been important to the area through the development of the Feltzen South area, later the Kingsburg area and now the entire area as a whole. This trend began with the investment of European buyers purchasing very undervalued land in the 1980s. Today all district communities enjoy high values due to the close proximity to ocean access and view.

=== Fishing ===
Fish landing are primarily with Ocean Choice International's freezer trawler as its Kraut Point, Nova Scotia base for the off shore scallop fishing industry and ship repairs. Landings are sent to facilities for further processing as does many smaller independent vessels participating in the in and off shore fisheries. Other various species of fish and crustaceans brought ashore include haddock, cod, tuna, lox, snow crab and lobster.

The village experienced a devastating fire in 1982 fire destroyed much of the fishing operations, though the spirit of the community has not diminished over the years. The Kraut Point facility that remains is a small footprint of a much larger facility that employed over 600 people, making Ritcey Bros Seafoods and its predecessor, H.B. Nickerson Seafood's one of the largest employers in Lunenburg County. Since that time the facility was owned by Fisheries Products International, the current-day Ocean Choice International.

== Culture ==
=== Organizations ===
Local organizations calling the area home includes, IOOF Lodge, Kingsburg Coastal Conservancy, Trinity Fiddlers, Riverport District Board of Trade and Community Development Committee, Riverport Lions Club, Riverport and Area Community Choir, Riverport United Church Pastoral Charge, Riverport District Community Center and Lady Auxiliary, Riverport District Fire Department and Lady Auxiliary, St. Mark's Place and The Old Confidence Lodge Studio and Stage.

=== Activities ===
Some local activities include live music all summer at The Ovens, musical artists perform live and record at the Old Confidence Lodge, various community potluck events and the rumhaven for the Riverport Rum Runners Sea Festival weekend. Three major annual events travel through the district, the Osprey 5 km Run/Walk, the Lunenburg-Riverport Road Race and the Riverport Duathlon. Three religious denominations are based in the Riverport District, Presbyterian, Lutheran and United Churches.

== In popular culture ==
Riverport was one of the filming locations for the 1995 film Dolores Claiborne, based on the Stephen King novella of the same name. The film was shot in various places around Nova Scotia, especially the South Shore and Annapolis Valley.
