= Five Houses, Nova Scotia =

Five Houses, Nova Scotia could be the following places in Nova Scotia:

- Five Houses, Colchester County
- Five Houses, Lunenburg County
