= Five Houses =

Five Houses may refer to:

- Five Houses, Isle of Wight
- Five Houses, Colchester County, Nova Scotia
- Five Houses, Lunenburg County, Nova Scotia
- Five Houses of Chán
