= Ebenezer Moseley =

Canadian ship builder (1813–1903)

Ebenezer Moseley (February 14, 1813 – June 18, 1903) was a Boston-born ship builder in 19th century Nova Scotia. His best known ship is the barque Stag.

== Early life ==
Ebenezer Moseley was born in Dorchester, Massachusetts to shipbuilder Phineas Moseley and his wife Sarah (née Tilton). When Ebenezer, known as Eben, was five years old, the family moved to Halifax, Nova Scotia and set up a shipyard in Richmond in the north of Halifax. After attending school, Moseley worked at his father's ship yard. One of his first ships, Falcon won the Halifax Harbour regatta prize for first class yachts in 1837. In 1839, Moseley's father died.

== La Have Shipyard ==
On 16 May 1840, Ebenezer married Anne Jane Cummings. Their first son, Ebenezer Tilton Moseley, was born in 1844. In 1853, the Richmond shipyard was sold to the provincial government and Eben and Henry decided to sail to Australia. After leaving Halifax, bad weather forced them to land near the LaHave river, and the quality of trees there convinced the Moseley's to abandon their trip to Australia and open a shipyard on the spot. It was here that Moseley built the barque Stag for a Halifax merchant. The yard operated until Henry's death in 1864, whereupon Eben and his family returned to Halifax and settled in Dartmouth.

== Dartmouth Shipyard ==
In Dartmouth, Moseley continued to build ships in a yard in Dartmouth Cove, including the military transport steamer, Lily. He also built the racing yacht Whisper, which would capture the Prince of Wales Cup of the Halifax yacht Club two years in a row, in 1865 and 1866. Moseley left the club in a dispute over his loss of the cup in 1867. As the golden age of sail began its decline, Moseley diversified his operations and began marketing an anti-fouling paint to protect wooden hulls from rot. The product was marketed locally under the Dominion Copper Paint company. Moseley was known as an innovator in ship design, both for his use of blueprints in a time when wooden half-models were the norm, and for testing the hydrodynamics of models of his designs in a tub. He submitted designs to the Paris Exhibition of 1867 and the Columbian Exposition of 1893, winning a prize for his submissions to the latter. Moseley's shipyard in Dartmouth was destroyed by fire in 1890, and Moseley died in his home in Dartmouth in 1903 at the age of 90.

== Ships built ==
The following is a partial list of ships designed by Moseley.

- Falcon
- Sir Peter Hachett
- Stag
- Whisper
- Lilly
- Nymphia
- Blanche

== Selected books ==
- Chapman, Harry. The Dartmouthians: Footprints in the Sands of Time. Dartmouth Historical Association, 2005.
- Erhard, Nancie. First in its class: the story of the Royal Nova Scotia Yacht Squadron. Halifax, 1986.
- N.S., Provincial Museum and Science Library, Report, Halifax, 1928–29.
