= Fort Sainte-Marie-de-Grâce =

Historic site in Nova Scotia, Canada

Coordinates: 44.2936°N 64.3576°W

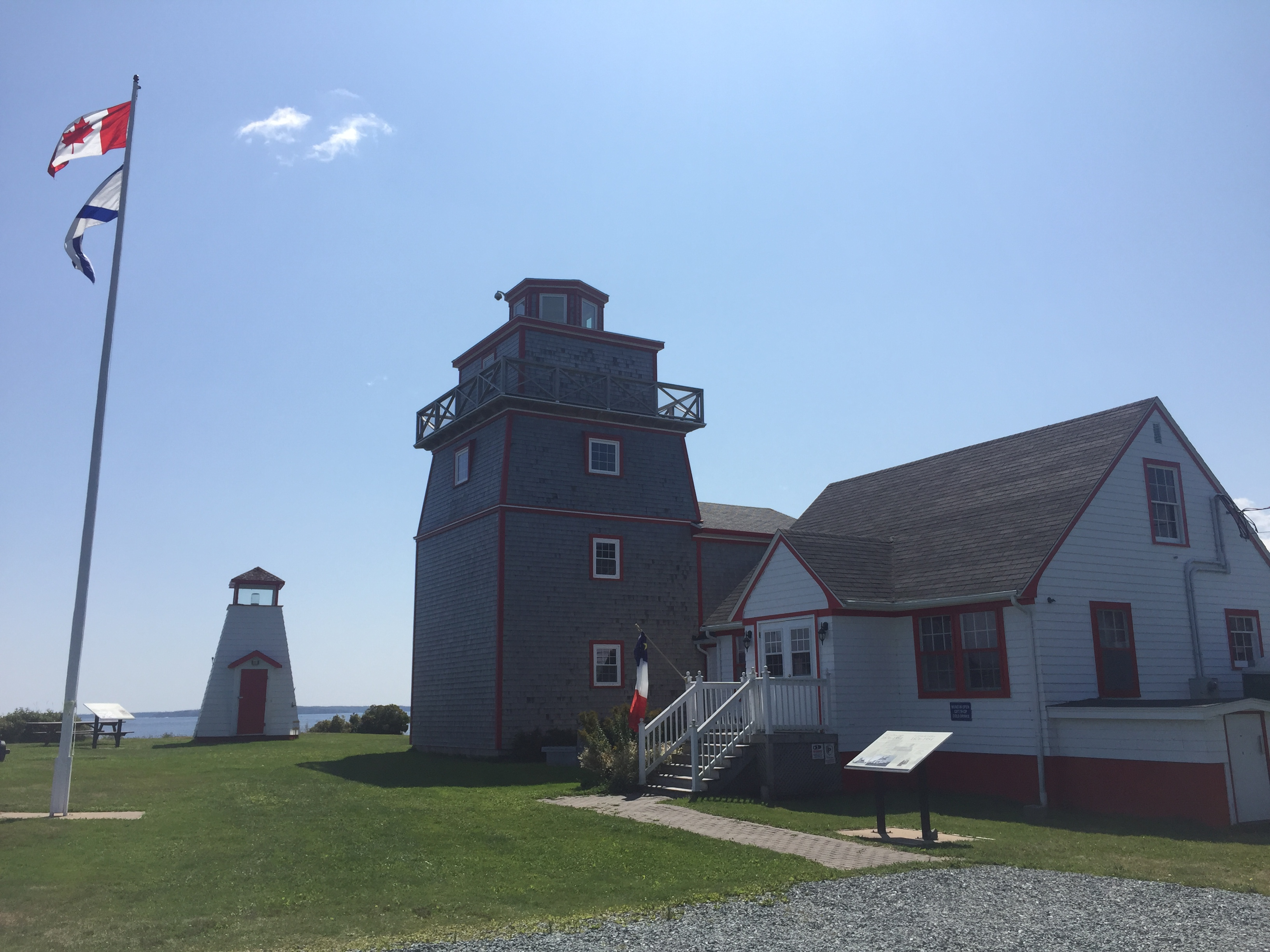
Fort Point Museum, La Have, Nova Scotia

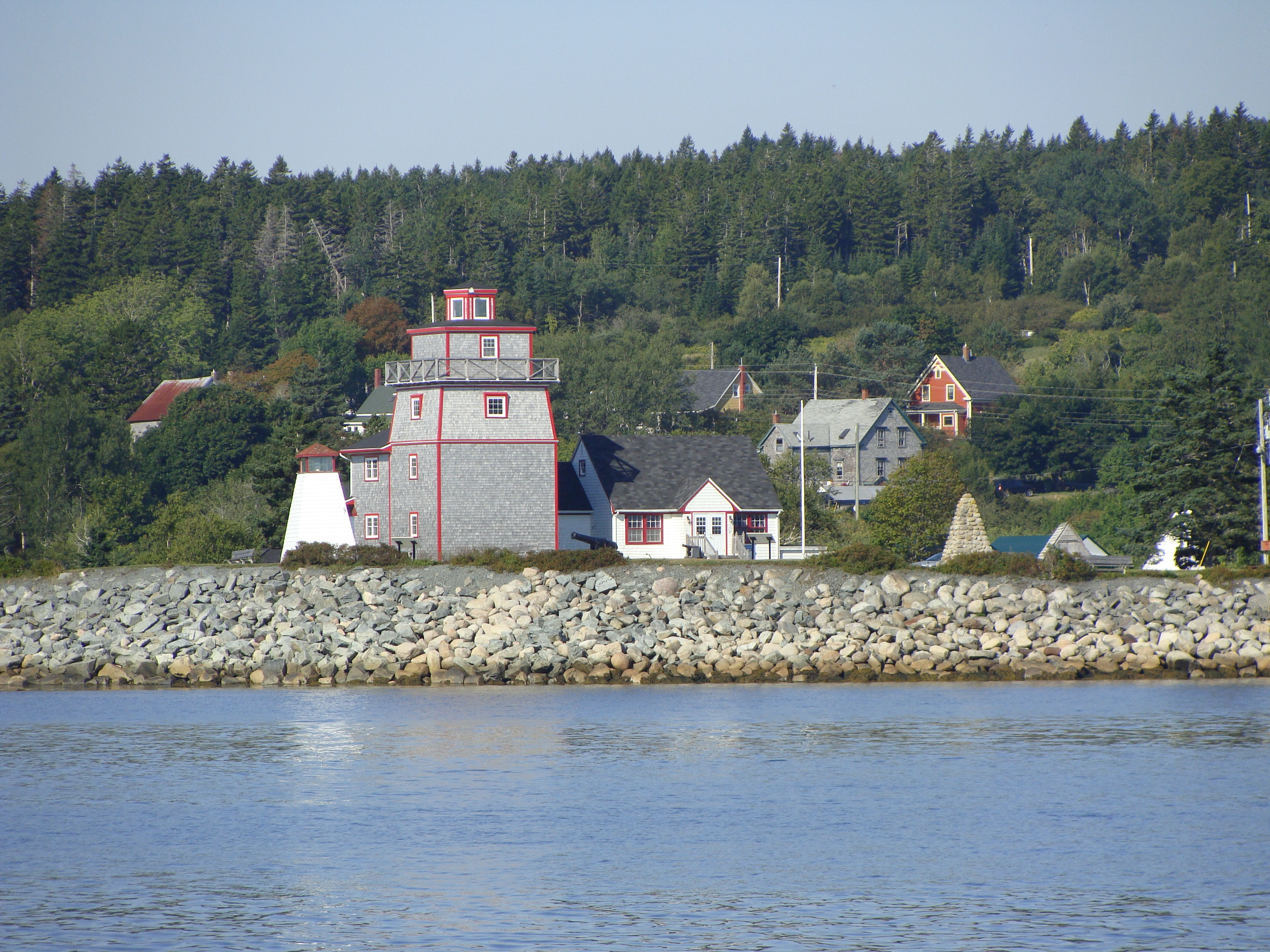
Fort Point Museum

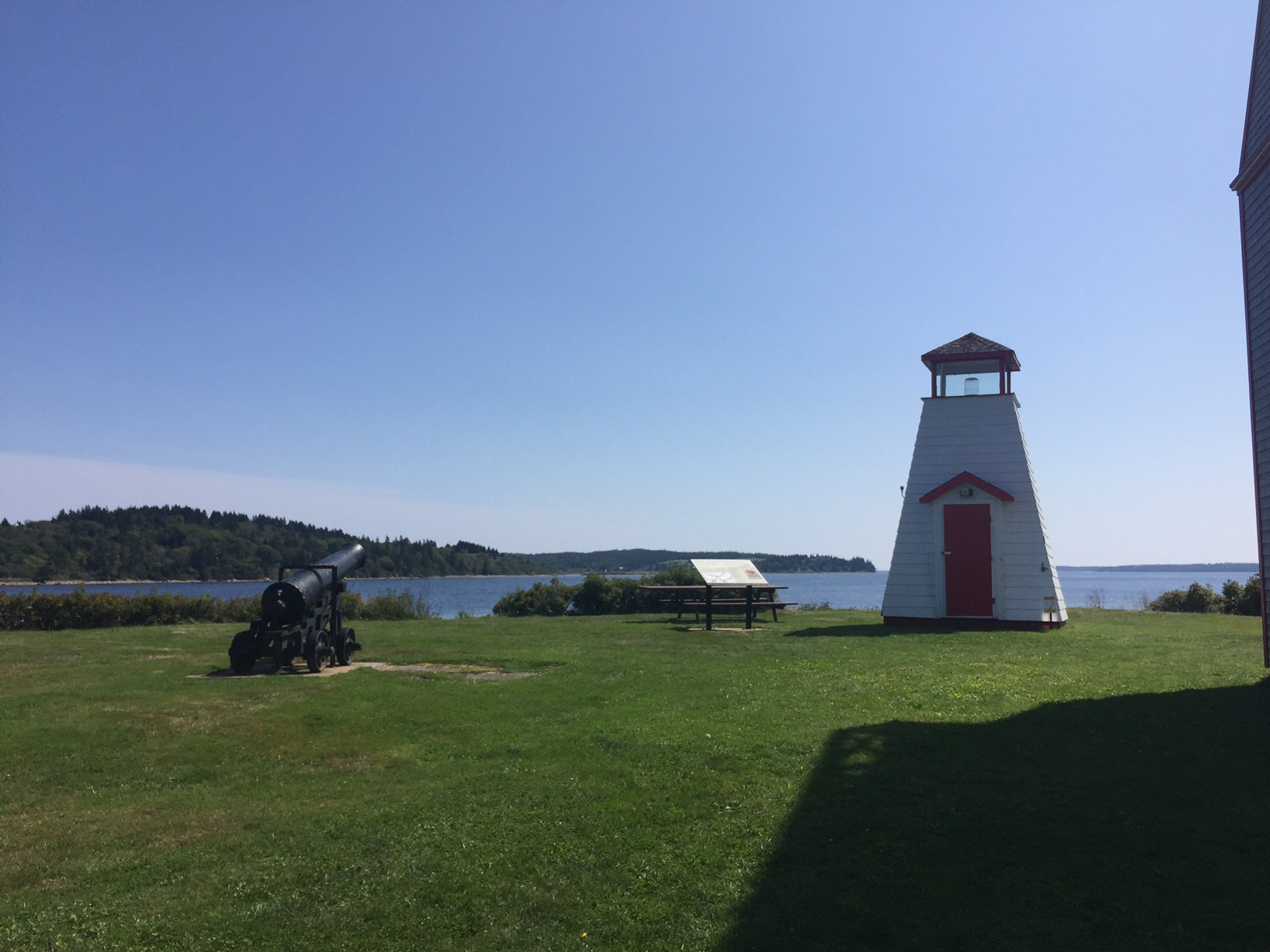
Fort Point Museum, LaHave, Nova Scotia

Fort Sainte-Marie-de-Grâce was the capital of Acadia (1632–1636) and its location is now a national historic site located in LaHave, Nova Scotia, Canada. The site is currently known as the Fort Point Museum on Fort Point Road.

Following the signing of the Treaty of Saint-Germain-en-Laye between the English and French in 1632, Governor Isaac de Razilly returned to Acadia and decided to move the capital from Port Royal, Nova Scotia, to LaHave and built the fort. The fort was abandoned in 1636 after the death of the governor and the fort was destroyed by fire in the 1650s.

The site of the fort was registered as an historic site on 4 June 1924. The land on which the fort was built has eroded away, but a cairn commemorating the site is situated nearby.
