= LaHave River =

River in Nova Scotia, Canada

LaHave
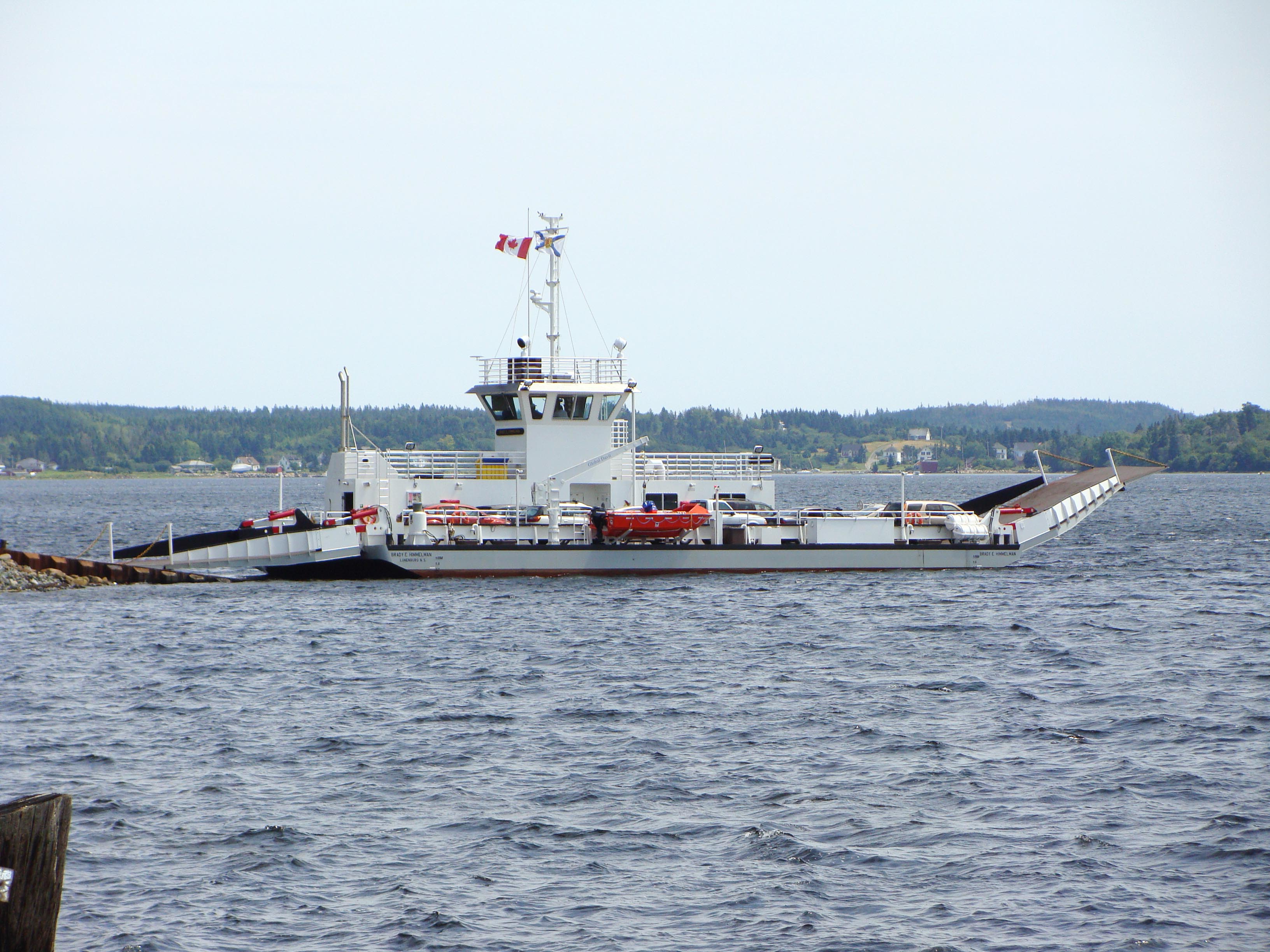

- Location of mouth

Location
- Country: Canada
- Province: Nova Scotia

Physical characteristics
- Mouth: Atlantic Ocean
  - coordinates: 44°22′2.1″N 64°28′47.1″W
  - elevation: sea level
- Length: 97 km (60 mi)
- Basin size: 1,700 km^{2} (660 sq mi)

The LaHave River is a 97 km (60 mi) river in Nova Scotia, Canada, running from its source in Annapolis County to the Atlantic Ocean. Along its way, it splits the communities of LaHave and Riverport and runs along the Fairhaven Peninsula and bisects the town of Bridgewater flowing into the LaHave River estuary. Tides affect water levels for about 20 km up the river. There are a number of tourist attractions along the river, and it is also well-used for recreational sailing. As well as two bridges at Bridgewater, the river can be crossed by a cable ferry at the Community of LaHave.

The river and various spots in the area were named after Cap de la Hève, in France, by Pierre Dugua, Sieur de Monts in 1604. The name was later anglicized to LaHave.

== History ==
The Mi'kmaq name for the LaHave River is Pijinuiskaq, meaning "river of long joints" in the Mi'kmaq language. The Mi'kmaq, as the original inhabitants of the area, frequently travelled along the river using birch bark canoes and had several seasonal settlements along its banks. Artifacts indicating Mi'kmaq settlement have been found along the river dating back thousands of years. The Mi'kmaq continued to use the river as a waterway for several years after European settlement along its banks, although their historic ways of life were being made increasingly difficult to sustain.

During the American Revolution, on March 18, 1780, the Lunenburg militia secured the American prisoners taken from the Kitty on the LaHave River. They took the vessel back to Lunenburg and sold it. A month later, on 15 April 1780, the Lunenburg militia (35 men) and the British brigantine John and Rachael captured an American Privateer prize, also named Sally, off LaHave River, Nova Scotia. During the seizure, the privateers killed the head of the Militia (McDonald) and wounded two of the crew members of the John and Rachael.

On 1 September 1780, The Brig Observer under the command of John Crymes ran two small American privateer schooners - Dolphin and Dispatch - into the shore at LaHave. The crew of both vessels escaped through the woods.

The river later became a major lumbering and shipbuilding centre. The many large vessels constructed along the river include the famous clipper ship Stag. The river has since become a popular area for salmon fishing, attracting fisherman from mid-May to early July. According to estimates by the Province of Nova Scotia, there are 21,907 people resident within the LaHave watershed in 2011.

In 2017, biologists reported that the salmon fishery was being threatened because chain pickerel, an invasive species, were eating the salmon smolts.

In 2017, government funding totalling $12 million was allocated to improving the quality of the river water by improving the processing of sewage which was being piped into the river. However, in 2018, a broken sewage pipe in Bridgewater led to further contamination of the river.

== Gallery ==
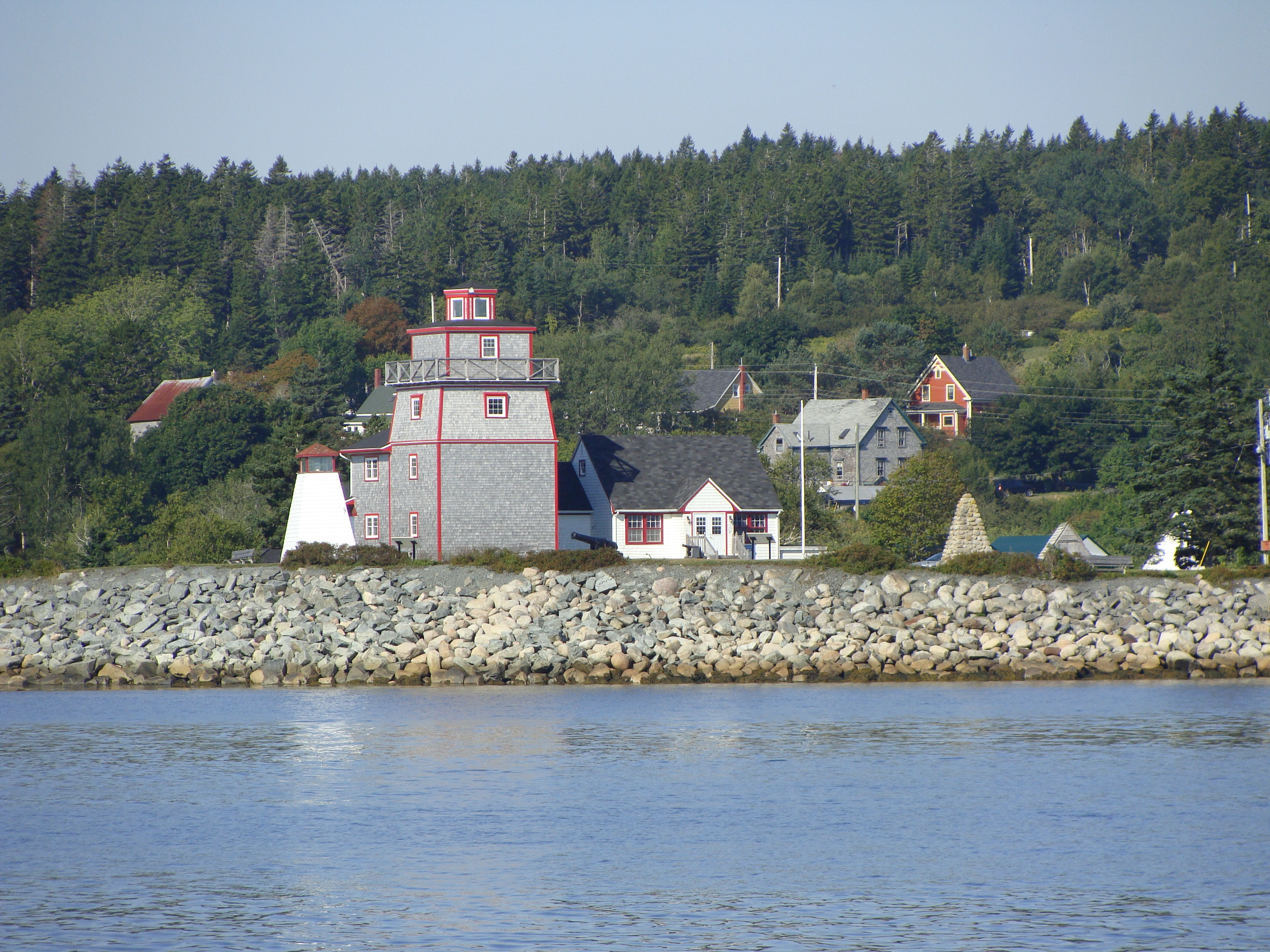
Fort Point Museum, LaHave, Nova Scotia

== See also ==
- List of rivers of Nova Scotia
