= Kingsburg, Nova Scotia =

Kingsburg
- Community
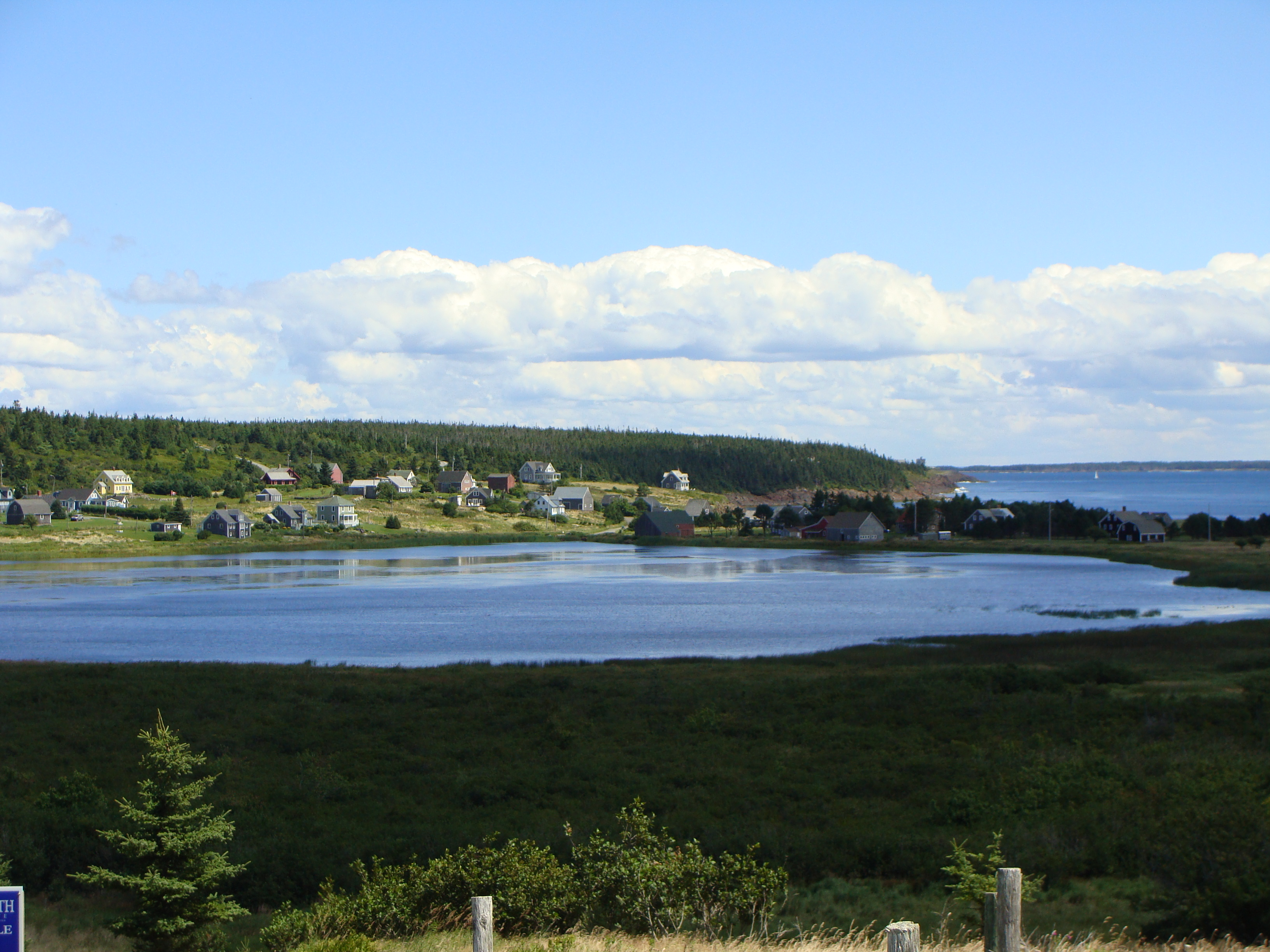
- Kingsburg From Beach Hill

- Location of the Kingsburg, Nova Scotia
- Coordinates: 44°16′35.9″N 64°15′57.2″W
- Country: Canada
- Province: Nova Scotia
- Municipality: Lunenburg Municipality
- Elevation: 0 m (0 ft)
- Highest elevation: 119 m (390 ft)
- Lowest elevation: 0 m (0 ft)
- Time zone: UTC-4 (AST)
  - Summer (DST): UTC-3 (ADT)
- Canadian Postal code: B0J 2X0
- Area code: 902
- Telephone Exchanges: 764, 766
- NTS Map: 21A8 Lunenburg
- GNBC Code: CBFUW
- Website: www.kingsburg.info

Kingsburg is a village in the province of Nova Scotia, Canada. The community is located approximately 130 kilometres from Halifax.

Kingsburg is also a protected cape.

== History ==
King George III issued a land grant of approximately 1350 acres to foreign Protestant settlers, Leonard Hirtle, John Mossman, Peter Knack, Christian Hartman, John Kayser and Jacob Moser on July 5, 1787.

For decades, Kingsburg was a fishing and farming community. By the middle of the twentieth century, with the widespread decline of small-scale Atlantic fishery, most fishing culture had disappeared.

== Economy ==
The evolution of Kingsburg into a vacation and retirement destination has had an impact on the population of the village. About 80% of the houses are vacant during most of the year.

Much of the rural infrastructure for Upper and Lower Kingsburg is centered in Riverport, Nova Scotia. This includes Riverport Electric, the first municipal utility incorporated in Nova Scotia, the Riverport & District Fire Department, Riverport & District Community Center, Riverport Community School and Riverport Post Office.

== Geography ==
The Kingsburg Peninsula extends from Rose Bay, around the headlands of Rose Head, Hell Point and Gaff Point to the LaHave River estuary. The Greater Kingsburg Peninsula includes the defined area plus West Ironbound Island. Neighbouring areas to the Kingsburg Peninsula include Upper Kingsburg and Lower Rose Bay.

== Gallery ==
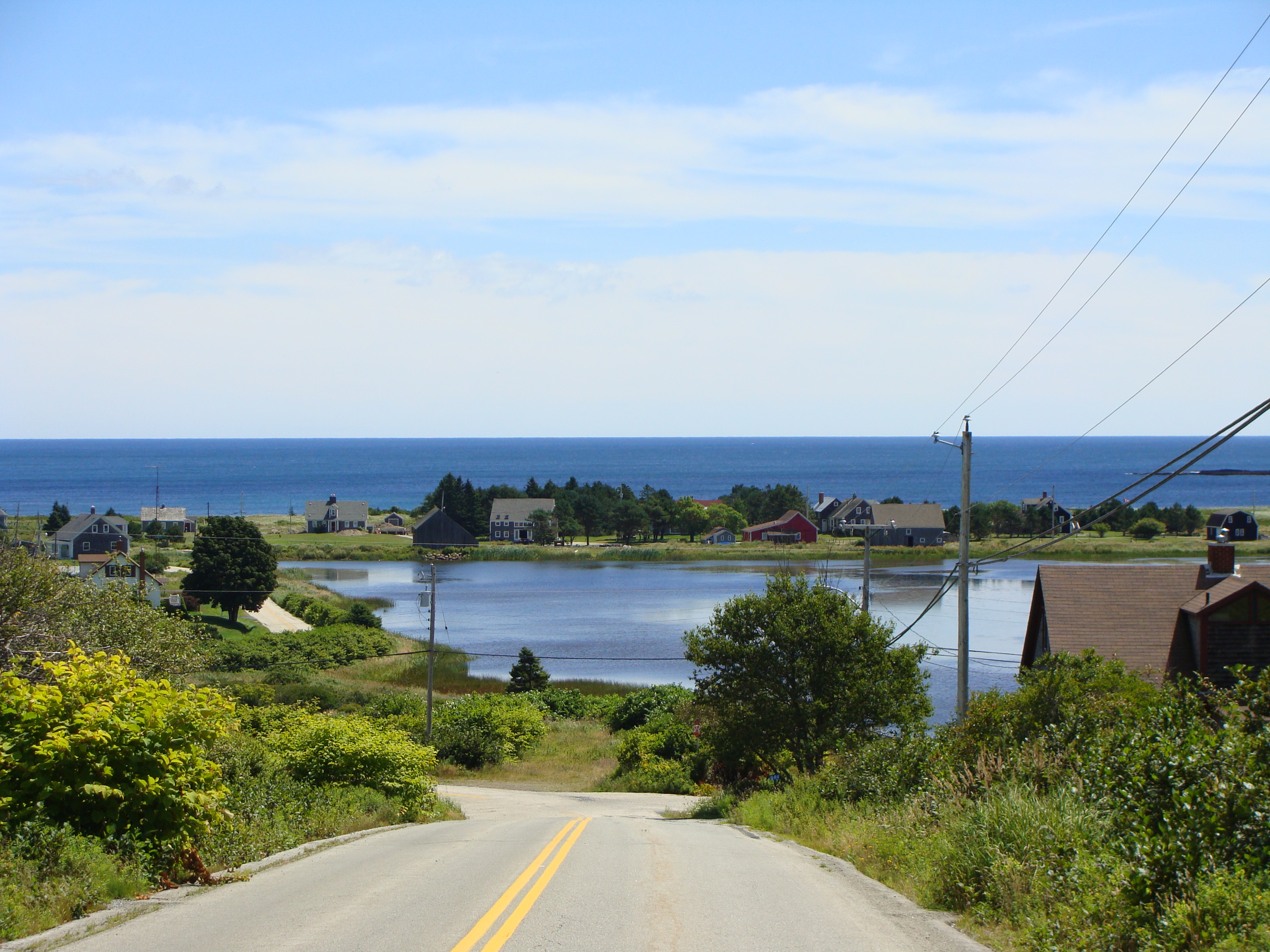
Kingsburg

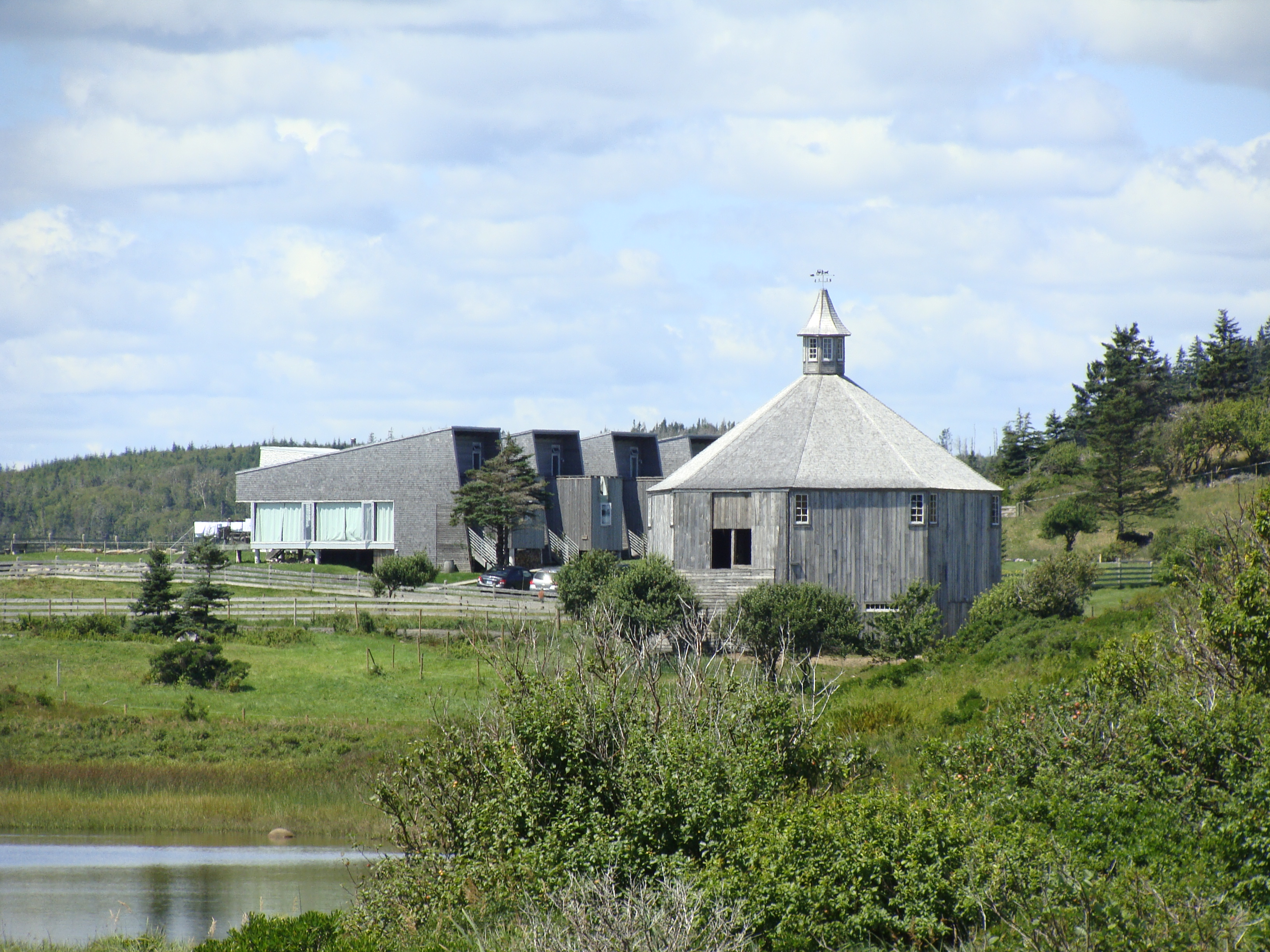
Shobac Cottages, and a troop barn

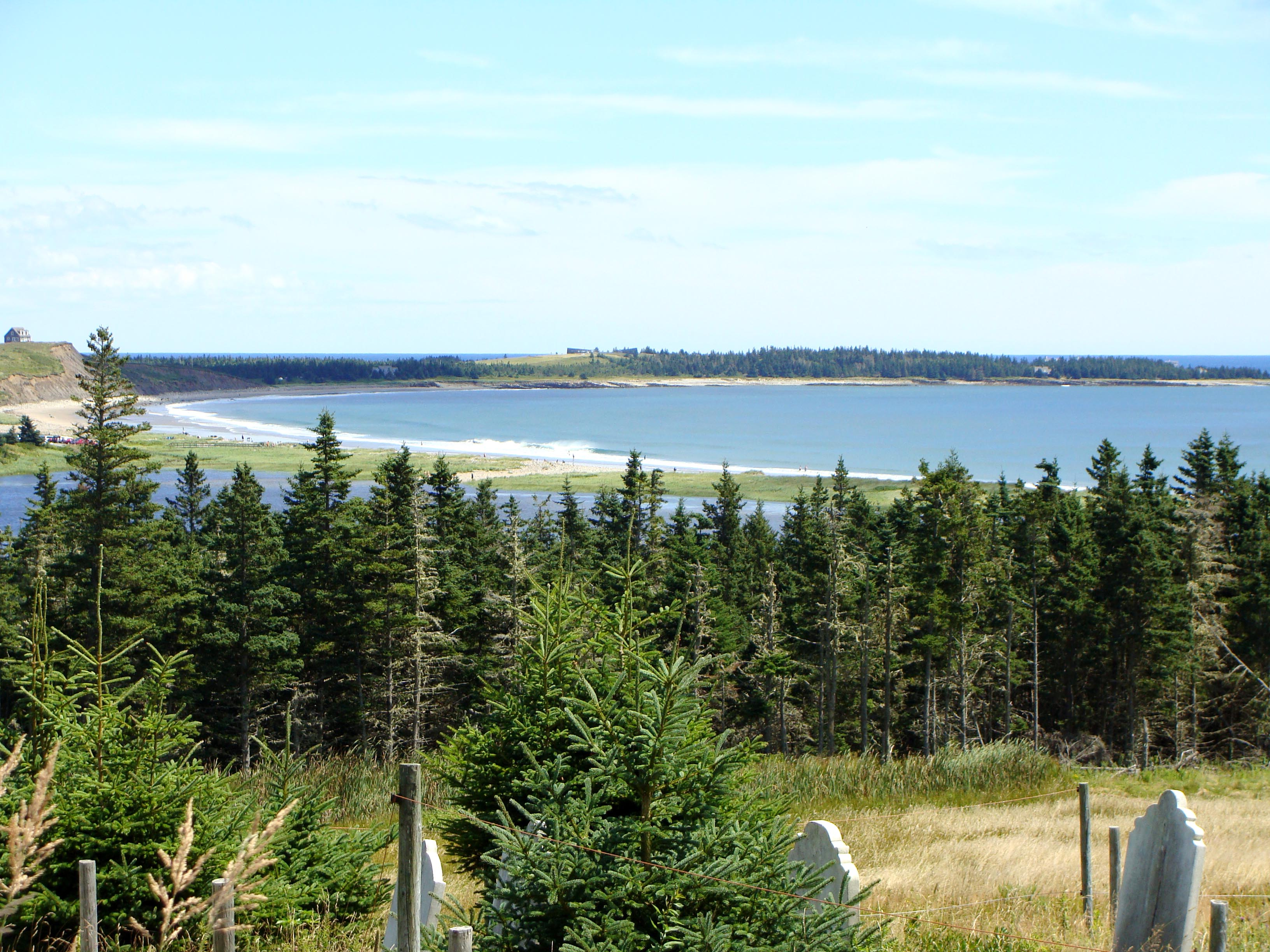
Pioneer cemetery overlooking Hirtle's Beach

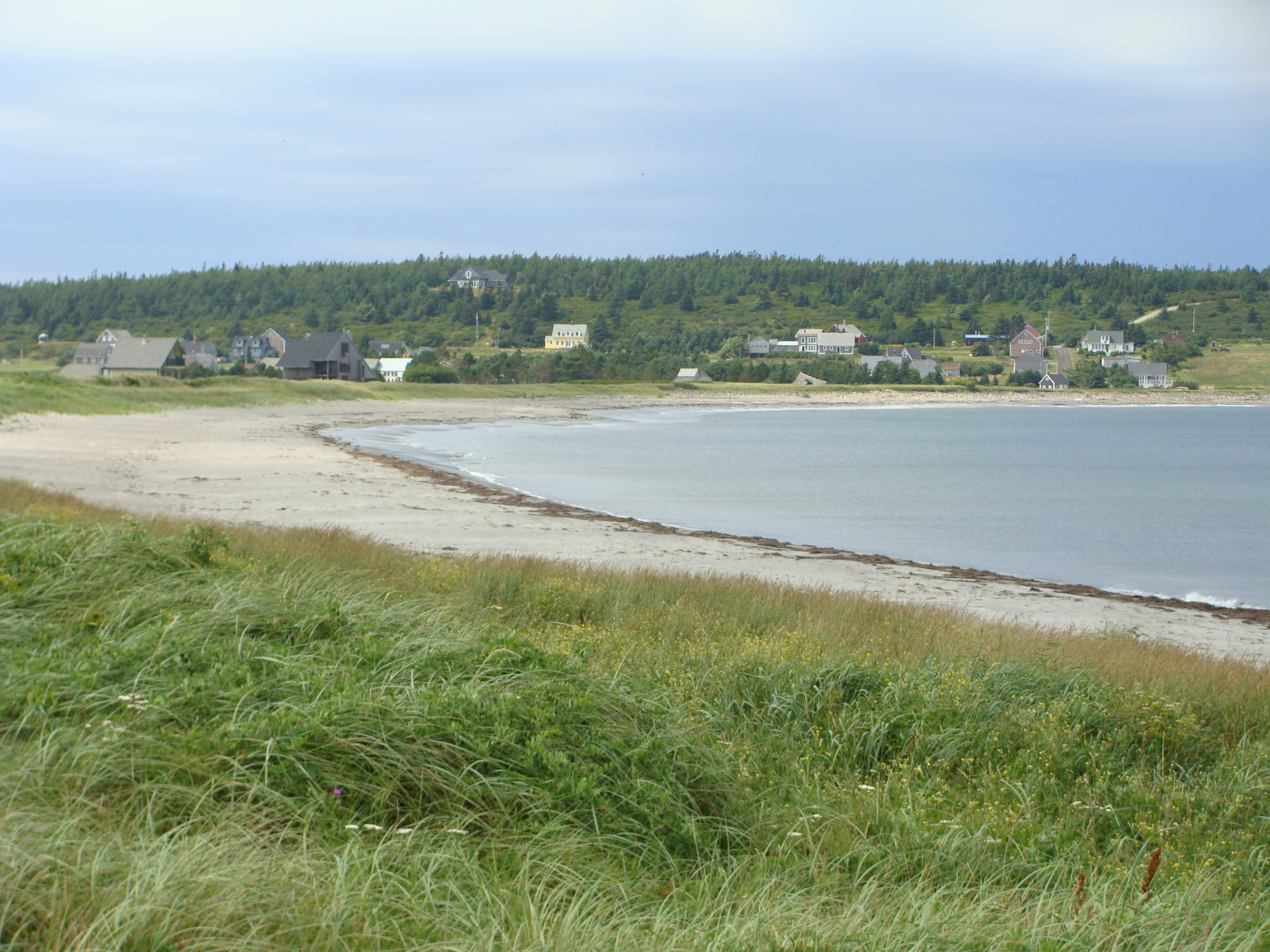
Kingsburg Beach

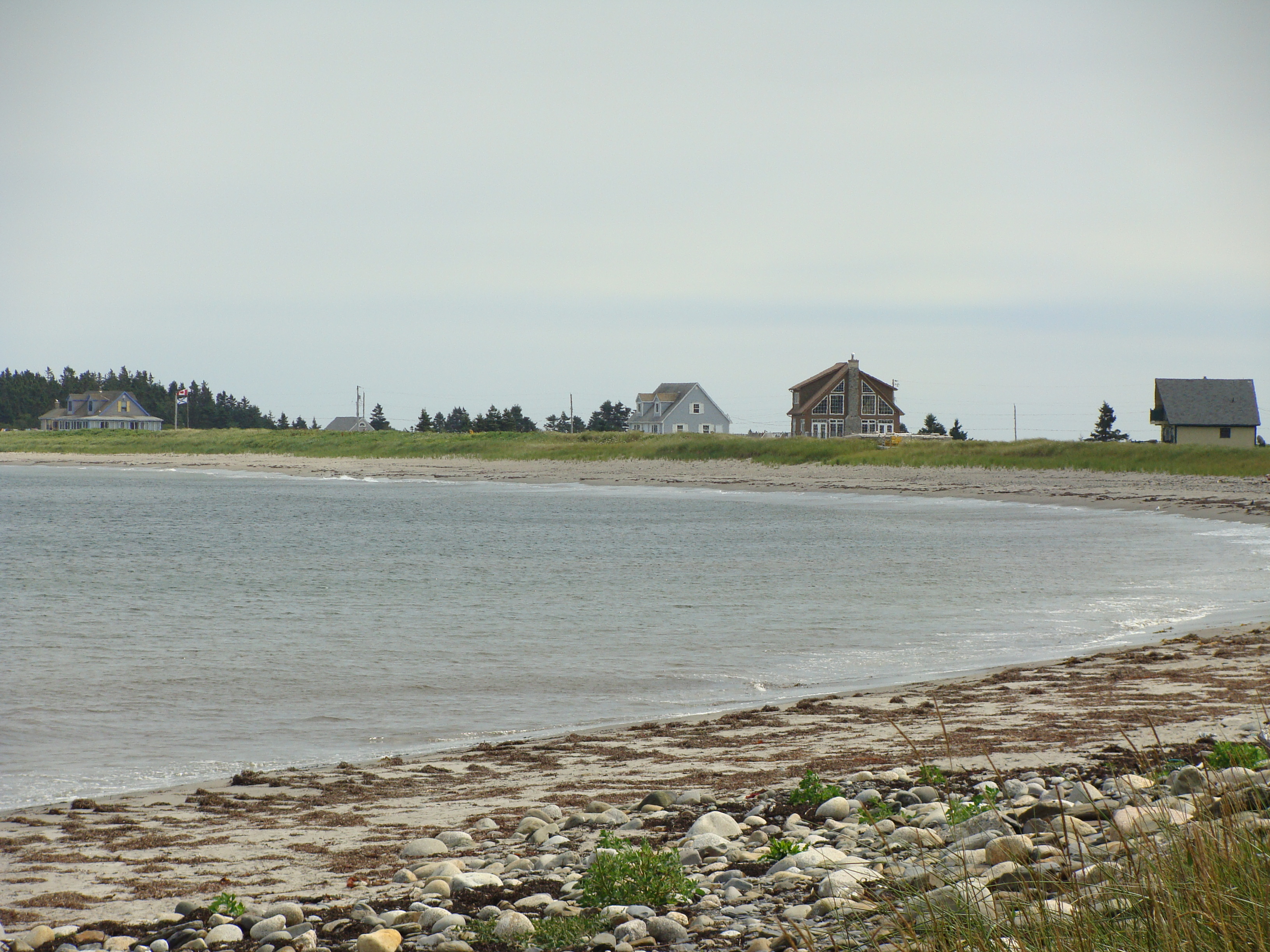
Kingsburg

== See also ==
- Royal eponyms in Canada
