= East LaHave, Nova Scotia =

Community in Nova Scotia, Canada

East LaHave
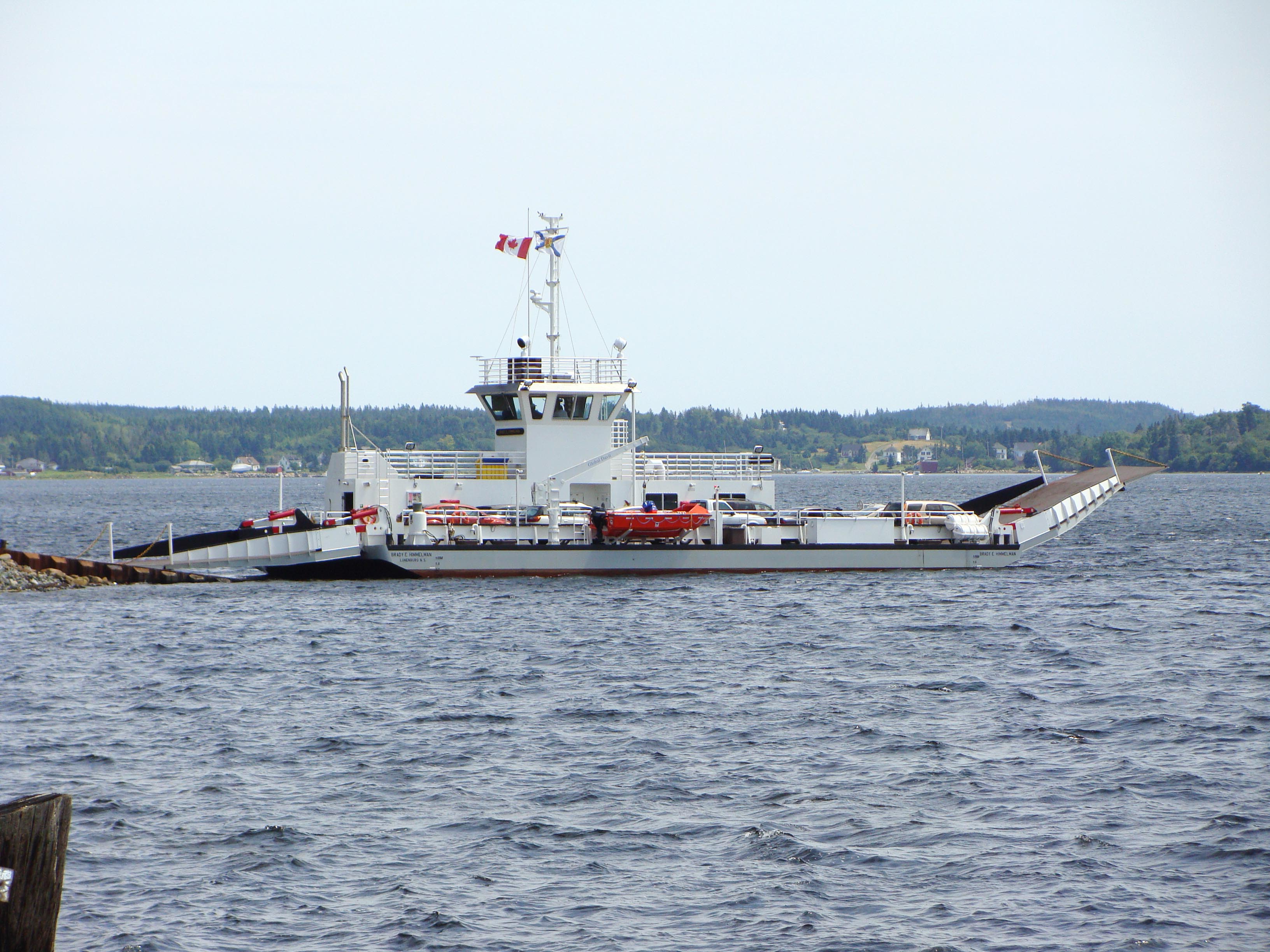
- East Lahave Cable Ferry

- Location within Nova Scotia
- Coordinates: 44°18′59″N 64°21′57″W
- Country: Canada
- Province: Nova Scotia
- Municipality: Lunenburg Municipality
- Elevation: 0 m (0 ft)
- Highest elevation: 119 m (390 ft)
- Lowest elevation: 0 m (0 ft)
- Time zone: UTC-4 (AST)
  - Summer (DST): UTC-3 (ADT)
- Canadian Postal code: B0J 2W0
- Area code: 902
- Telephone Exchanges: 764, 766
- NTS Map: 021A08
- GNBC Code: CBFUW
- Website: www.modl.ca

East LaHave is a small community in the Canadian province of Nova Scotia, located in the Lunenburg Municipal District in Lunenburg County. The community is home to a cable ferry linking East Lahave to LaHave, Nova Scotia across the LaHave River.
