= John O'Brien (marine artist) =

Canadian marine artist

John O'Brien (1831–1891) was a Canadian marine artist. He excelled at ship portraits combined with dramatic storm scenes.

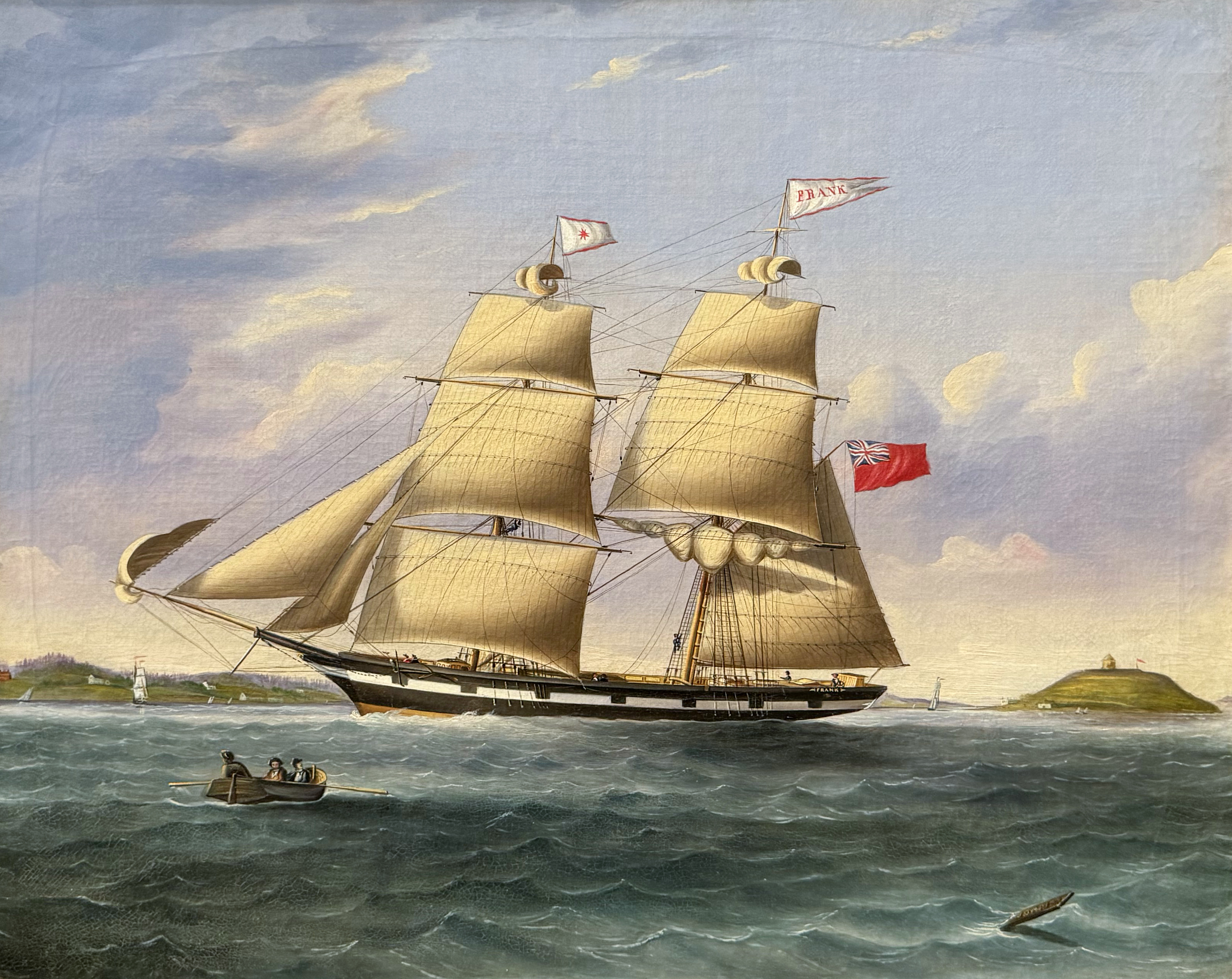
The Frank off George Island, in a Heavy Sea, 1856

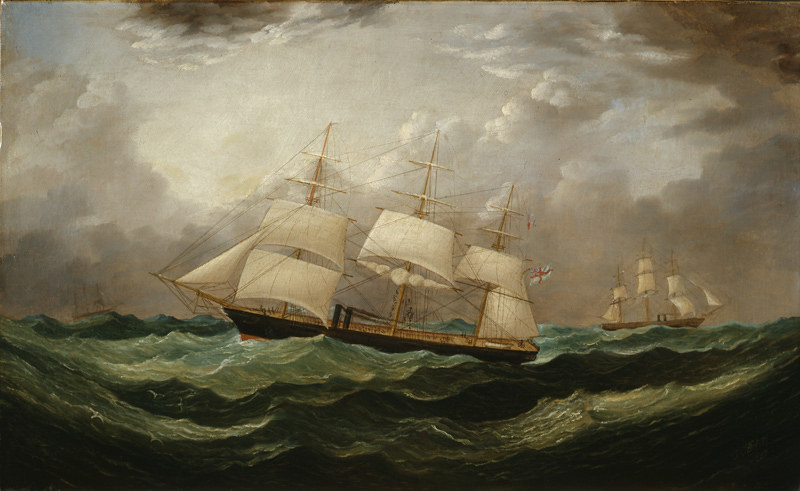
HMS Galatea, in a Heavy Sea, circa 1888 by O'Brien

== Career ==
John Daniel O’Connell O'Brien (named for the Irish "Liberator," Daniel O'Connell) is believed to have been born in Saint John, New Brunswick but his parents moved to Halifax when he was a baby. In his youth, he worked as a sign painter and as a ship portraitist.

He emerged as a self-taught artist in Halifax, Nova Scotia in 1850 and advertised himself as a professional in 1853. In 1857, he studied in England with the English landscape artist John Wilson Carmichael, where he learned to colour photographs as well as to paint stormy skies. His journey, which also included time in France, was paid for by a group of Halifax business owners. Upon his return to Halifax, the artist began documenting the increasingly busy naval activity of the city's growing harbour.

His career flourished as Nova Scotia's shipping industry grew and his many notable paintings include a portrait of the famous clipper Stag and dramatic storm portraits of the warship HMS Galatea. At the height of his career in 1859, he suffered a partial loss of vision. His career underwent a decline in the 1870s, when he produced very few works, but revived in the 1880s when he returned to easel painting, producing almost half of his known 53 works in the studio.

== Selected collections ==
- Art Gallery of Nova Scotia;
- National Gallery of Canada;
- Sobey art collection.
- Maritime Museum of the Atlantic.
