= LaHave, Nova Scotia =

- Community
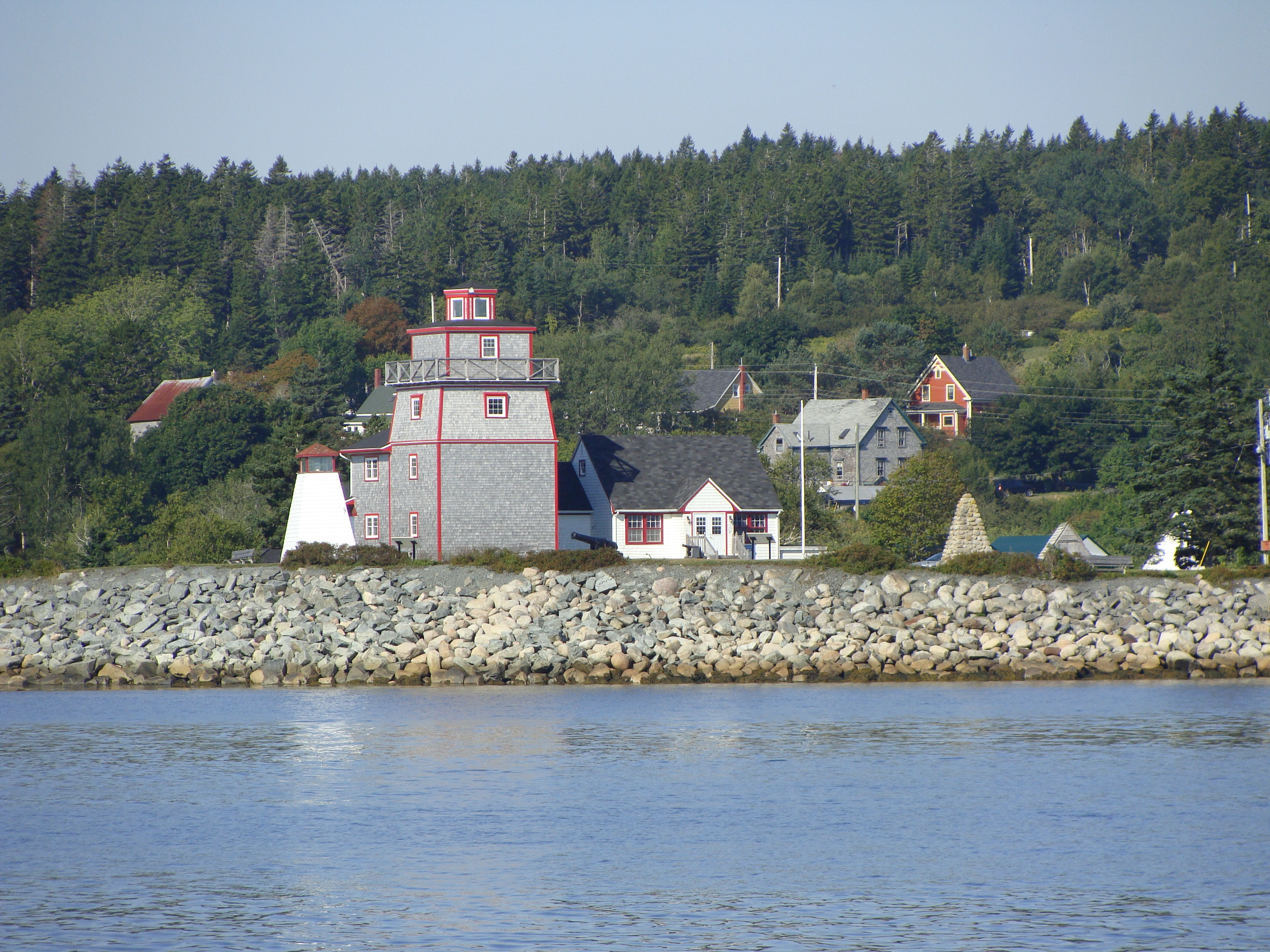
- Fort Point Museum, LaHave, Nova Scotia

- Location within Nova Scotia
- Coordinates: 44°17′37.25″N 64°21′27.22″W
- Country: Canada
- Province: Nova Scotia
- Municipality: Lunenburg Municipality
- Settled: 1632
- Elevation: 0 m (0 ft)
- Highest elevation: 119 m (390 ft)
- Lowest elevation: 0 m (0 ft)
- Time zone: UTC-4 (AST)
  - Summer (DST): UTC-3 (ADT)
- Canadian Postal code: B0R 1C0
- Area code: 902
- Telephone Exchanges: 688
- NTS Map: 021A08
- GNBC Code: CBFUW
- Website: www.fortpointmuseum.com

LaHave (La Hève) is a Canadian community in Lunenburg County, Nova Scotia. The community is located across the river from Riverport and approximately 15 kilometres from the town of Bridgewater. Once the capital of Acadia, it is located on Highway 331 at the mouth of the 97 km long LaHave River.

== LaHave Islands ==
The LaHave Islands are a small group of islands near shore a few km south of LaHave. Some of the islands are linked by a road to the mainland. The islands are a popular coastal paddling destination.

The LaHave Islands Marine Museum (c. 1913), located on Bush Island and accessible by road, is on the Canadian Register of Historic Places. Nearby is Bush Island Provincial Park.

== History ==
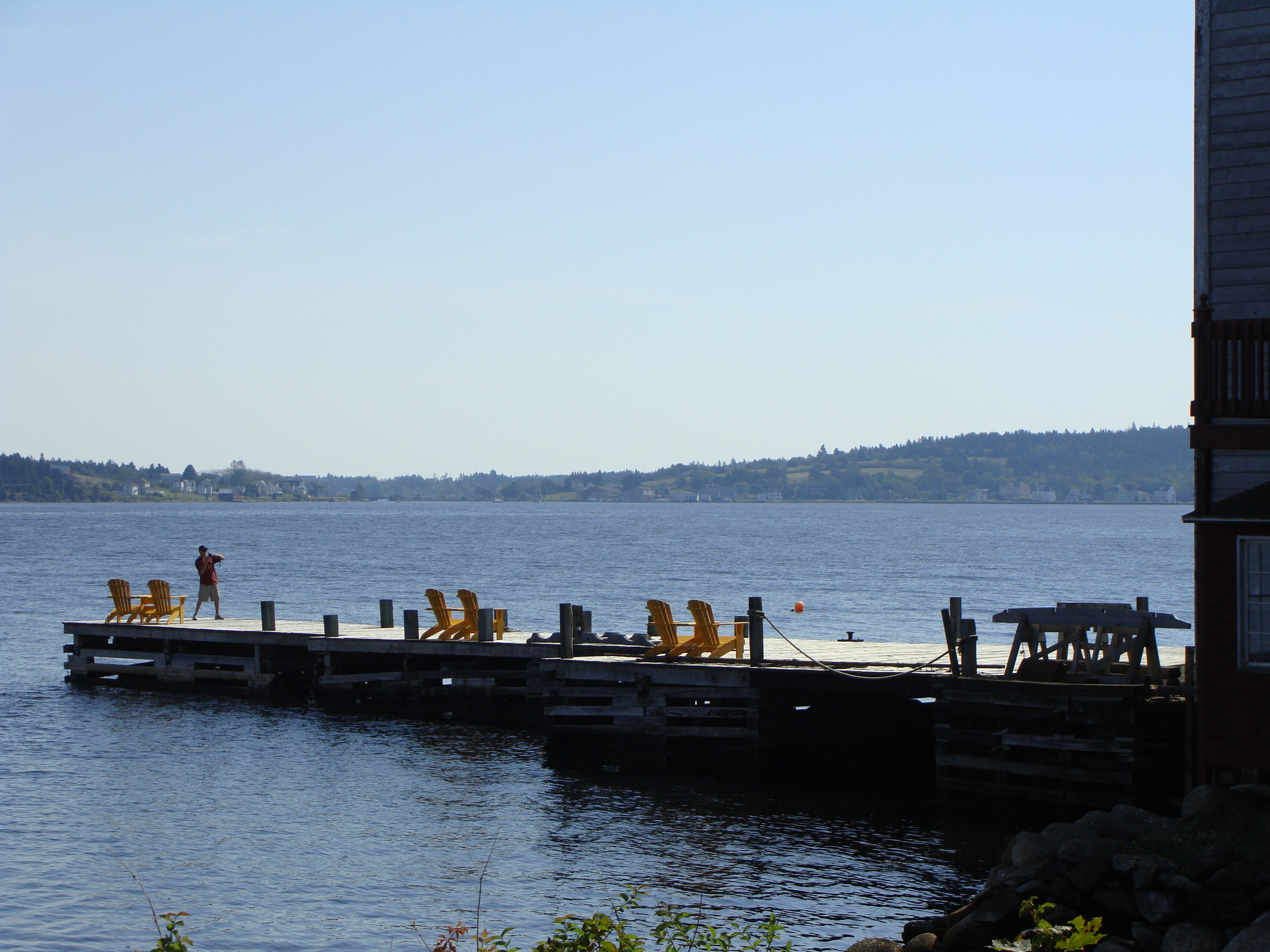
Pier

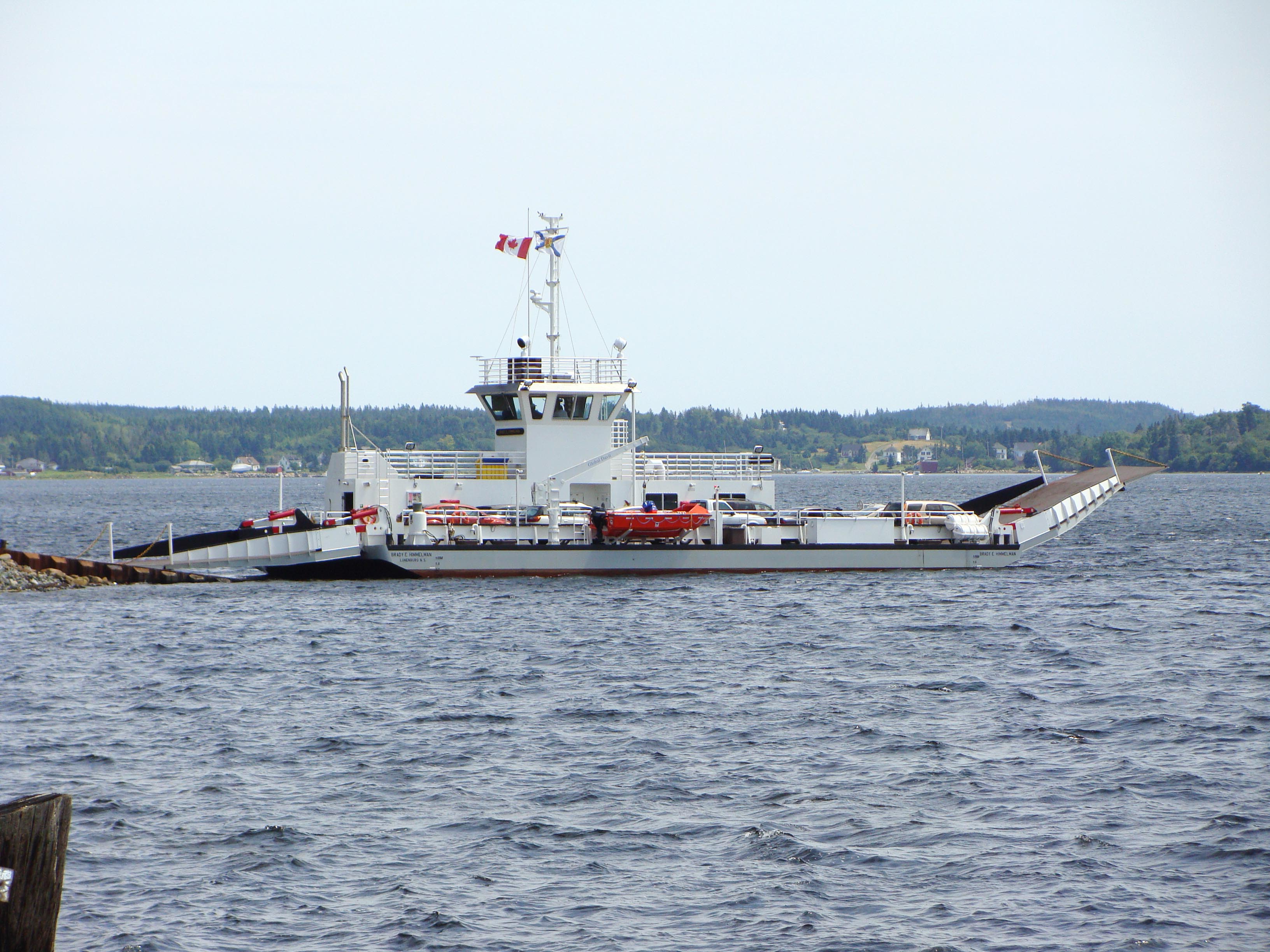
LaHave River ferry

=== Mi'kmaq Settlement and French colony ===
La Hève was an important centre for the Mi'kmaq people, who traded with Europeans. Messamouet, a well-known sakmow, or Chief, of the Mi'kmaq Nation, is reported to have been from the LaHave area.

Samuel de Champlain called there in 1604 on his first trip to Acadia. Henry Hudson made landfall there in 1609 on his voyage on behalf of the Dutch East India Company. Despite being shown hospitality by the Mi'kmaq, Hudson's crew staged an unprovoked assault on the Mi'kmaq settlement. As a result, the Mi'kmaq staged a raid on the next Dutch ship to visit in 1611.

La Hève was the capital of Acadia from 1632, when Isaac de Razilly settled on a point of land at the mouth of the LaHave River, until his sudden death in 1635. Razilly established a colony of 300 and built Fort Ste. Marie de Grace. Razilly reported that the fort was capable of standing against all enemy action, and that he had the military supplies necessary to withstand a six-month siege. There was also a chapel, a store and houses for the workmen in the village. Within twelve months of Razilly's arrival, La Have was a thriving trading post, the centre for a small farming community in the area, and a major port of call for the large fishing fleet. At one point there were five hundred transient fishermen in the settlement. Upon Razilly's death in 1635, the new Governor Charles de Menou d'Aulnay moved the Acadians from La Hève to Port Royal, Nova Scotia, which had been given up by the Scottish also in 1632. His wife Jeanne Motin, "daughter of Louis Motin, Sieur de Courcelles, who in addition to owning shares in the Razilly-Condonnier Company, was the controller of salt stores located at one of France's colonies, perhaps in the Caribbean", was of great strategic value in the subsequent struggle with La Tour. Ironically, she became Lady de La Tour in 1653 after Aulnay's death and La Tour's triumphant return with Letters Patent as governor of Acadia. Nicolas Denys and his brother Simon, who had come over with Razilly, in 1632, set up a "wood working plant" near present-day Riverport, Nova Scotia and a fishing station at Port Rossignol (now Liverpool, Nova Scotia). They stayed neutral in the war between Aulnay (at Port Royal) and La Tour (at Fort La Tour on the Saint John River).

In 1652, La Hève was still a trading post and was raided by Emmanuel Le Borgne.

During Queen Anne's War, New Englanders raided the community taking three Acadians prisoner (1705).

=== King George's War ===
During King George's War, two French officers, in a letter from Quebec, reported to the Count of Maurepas that "the English do not dry any fish on the east coast of Acadia since the war, through fear of being surprised there and killed by the Micmacs." This fear was well founded as these same officers also advised "... a boat belonging to an English merchantman having landed at La Hève for wood and water, these Indians killed 7 of the crew and brought their scalps to Sieur Marin,...".

The site of Fort Sainte-Marie de Grace was designated a National Historic Site of Canada in 1924.

=== American Revolution ===
On 15 April 1780 the Lunenburg militia (35 men) and the British brigantine John and Rachael captured an American privateer prize named Sally at the LaHave River. During the seizure, the privateers killed the head of the militia (McDonald) and wounded two of the crew members of John and Rachael.

=== Ship building ===
It was, at one time, the economic centre of fishing, trade and shipbuilding for the surrounding area. The many vessels built in the area include a famous clipper, the barque Stag.

=== Light Station ===
In 1874 LaHave Light Station was built and assisted ships navigating into the LaHave River until the 1950s, when a new lightkeeper's house was built to replace the aging light station. The light was decommissioned in the 1960s and replaced by a mechanical light on the opposite side of the river. In 1969, the Lunenburg County Historical Society was established to manage this historic site and turned the vacant lightkeeper's house into a community museum and gift shop. In 2006, the society completed a Renaissance Project, which included the construction and attachment of a new building resembling the original 1874 LaHave Light Station, to the lightkeeper's house. The new museum is heated and cooled by a geothermal system, one of the first museums in Canada to utilize this technology. The Museum hosts many community events during the year, including the Acadian Mi'kmaq Festival, the LaHave River Folk Festival and a wide range of artistic exhibits.

== Lahave River cable ferry ==
Since 1832, LaHave has been connected to East LaHave, located on the opposite side of the LaHave river, via a cable ferry. In 1982, Brady E. Himmelman retired after 35 years of service, being the longest serving captain of LaHave ferries. In 2010, the LaHave Ferry II was replaced by a 14 car capacity ferry named in the honour of Brady E Himmelman. The Ferry is Operated by The Province of Nova Scotia.

On Friday, January 3, 2014, the Ferry broke free from its cable and drifted towards the open ocean, running aground at Oxners Beach.

== Present day ==
A volunteer LaHave and District Fire Department provides fire and first responder service to LaHave and the surrounding areas. A federal post office, Saint James Anglican Church and LaHave Seafoods are all located in LaHave.

A longstanding turn of the 20th century riverside chandlery landmark, has in recent years become the LaHave Bakery, which operates as a year-round bakery and cafe. The bakery houses a Craft Co-Op during the summer, where local artists sell their crafts. It is also home to a small custom manufacturer, Homegrown Skateboards.

Further down Highway 331, one will find Crescent Beach, a 2 kilometre long beach (only beach in NS that allows you to drive your car on the sand the length of the beach as if it were a road), the LaHave Islands, and Risser's Beach Provincial Park.
