= Stag (barque) =

Canadian sailing barque

History

Canada
- Name: Stag
- Owner: John Strachan, Halifax
- Port of registry: Halifax, Nova Scotia
- Laid down: 1854
- Launched: LaHave, Nova Scotia
- Fate: Sank February 12, 1863 Bermuda

General characteristics
- Tonnage: 209
- Length: 103.8 ft.
- Beam: 22.4 ft.
- Depth: 12.6 ft.
- Propulsion: Sail
- Sail plan: Barque

Stag was a barque built in Nova Scotia which was renowned for its speed. Designed by a pioneering Canadian naval architect Ebenezer Moseley, Stag was built with a dramatic "Aberdeen bow". Considered an Atlantic Canadian example of a Clipper Ship, she was famous for several fast passages, despite her small size, and was painted by the famous Nova Scotian ship portrait artist John O'Brien.
