= Five Houses, Colchester County =

Community in Nova Scotia, Canada

Coordinates: 45°24′17.00″N 63°42′11.7″W

Five Houses in Colchester County, Nova Scotia

Five Houses is an unincorporated community in the Canadian province of Nova Scotia, located in Colchester County.
