= Five Houses and Lower LaHave =

- Community
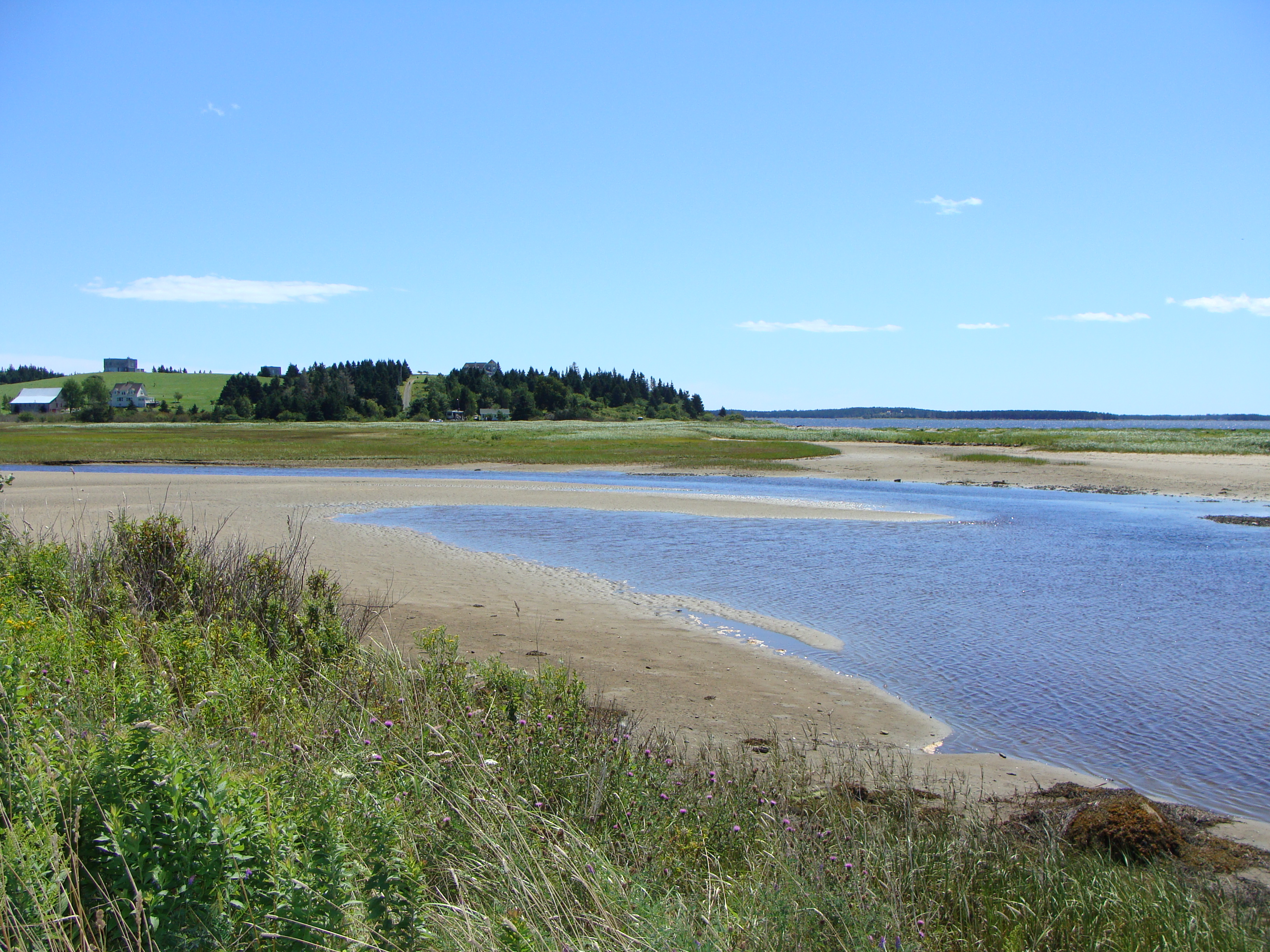
- Oxner's Head and beach from Five Houses

- Location of Five Houses, Nova Scotia
- Coordinates: 44°16′59.02″N 64°20′14.78″W
- Country: Canada
- Province: Nova Scotia
- Municipality: Lunenburg Municipality
- Elevation: 0 m (0 ft)
- Highest elevation: 119 m (390 ft)
- Lowest elevation: 0 m (0 ft)
- Time zone: UTC-4 (AST)
  - Summer (DST): UTC-3 (ADT)
- Canadian Postal code: B0J 2W0
- Area code: 902
- Telephone Exchanges: 764, 766
- NTS Map: 021A08
- GNBC Code: CBFUW
- Website: www.modl.ca

Lower LaHave and the smaller area of Five Houses is a small village in Nova Scotia, Canada on the shore of the LaHave River. The community is located in the Municipality of the District of Lunenburg in Lunenburg County.

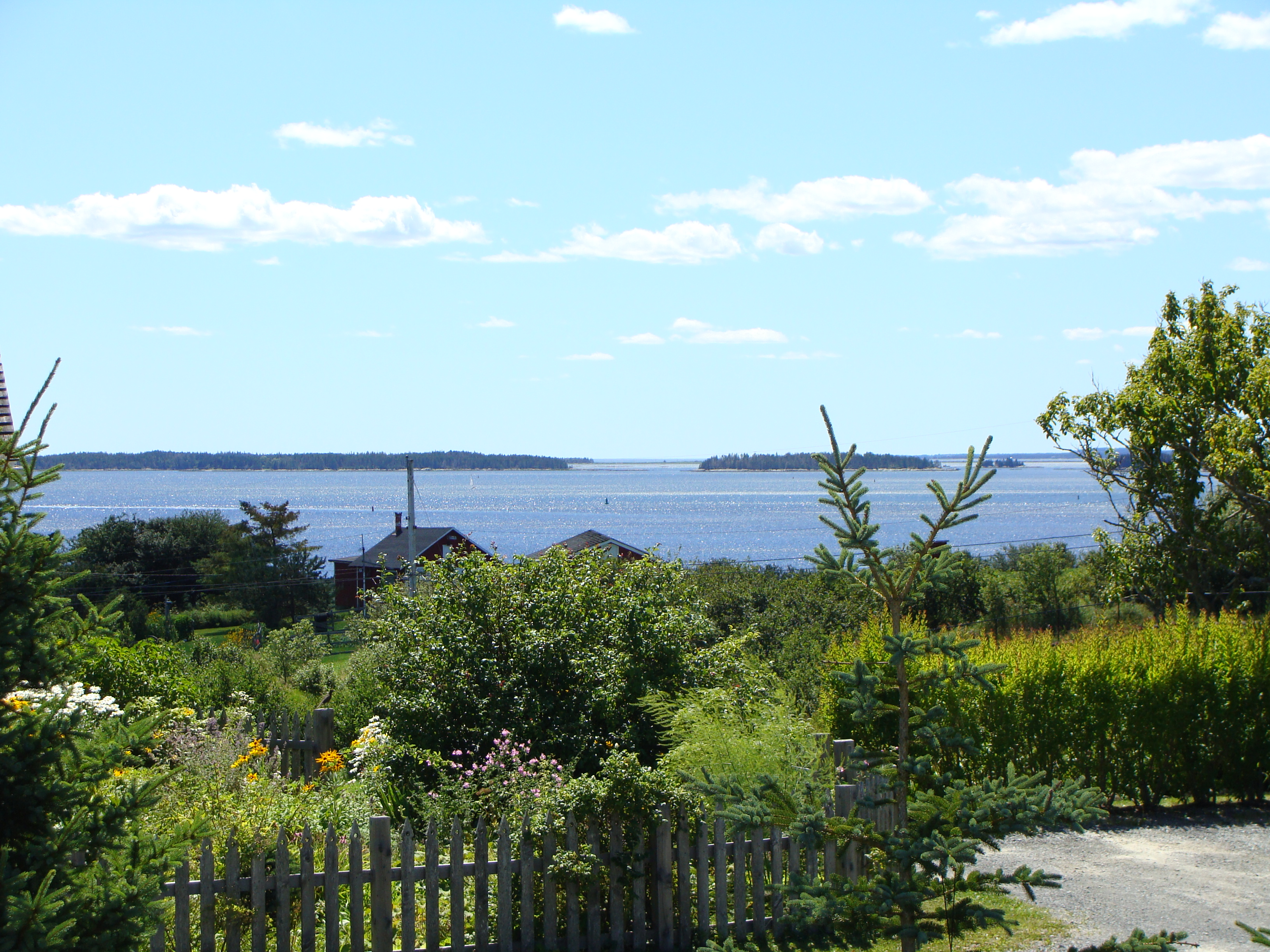
LaHave Islands from Romkey Hill

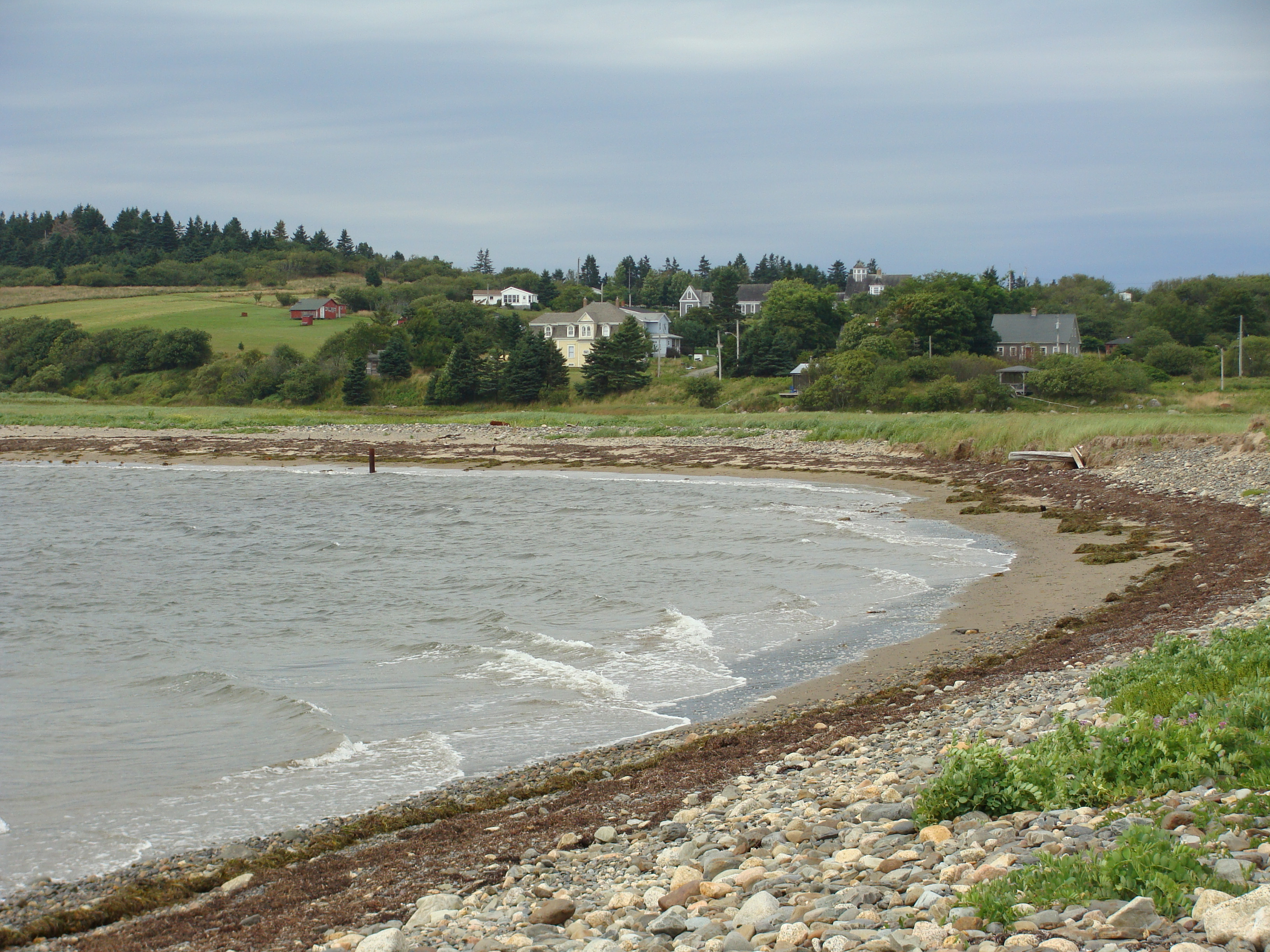
View of Five Houses from Oxner's Beach

== Geography ==
Lower LaHave covers a vast tracts of undeveloped forest land overlooking the LaHave River banks. It is anchored by history and marked with the Lower LaHave Commons. Part of Lower LaHave Area feature is an area known as "The Shobac", named for the land granted to Christian Shoubach.
