= Rose Bay, Nova Scotia =

Rose Bay
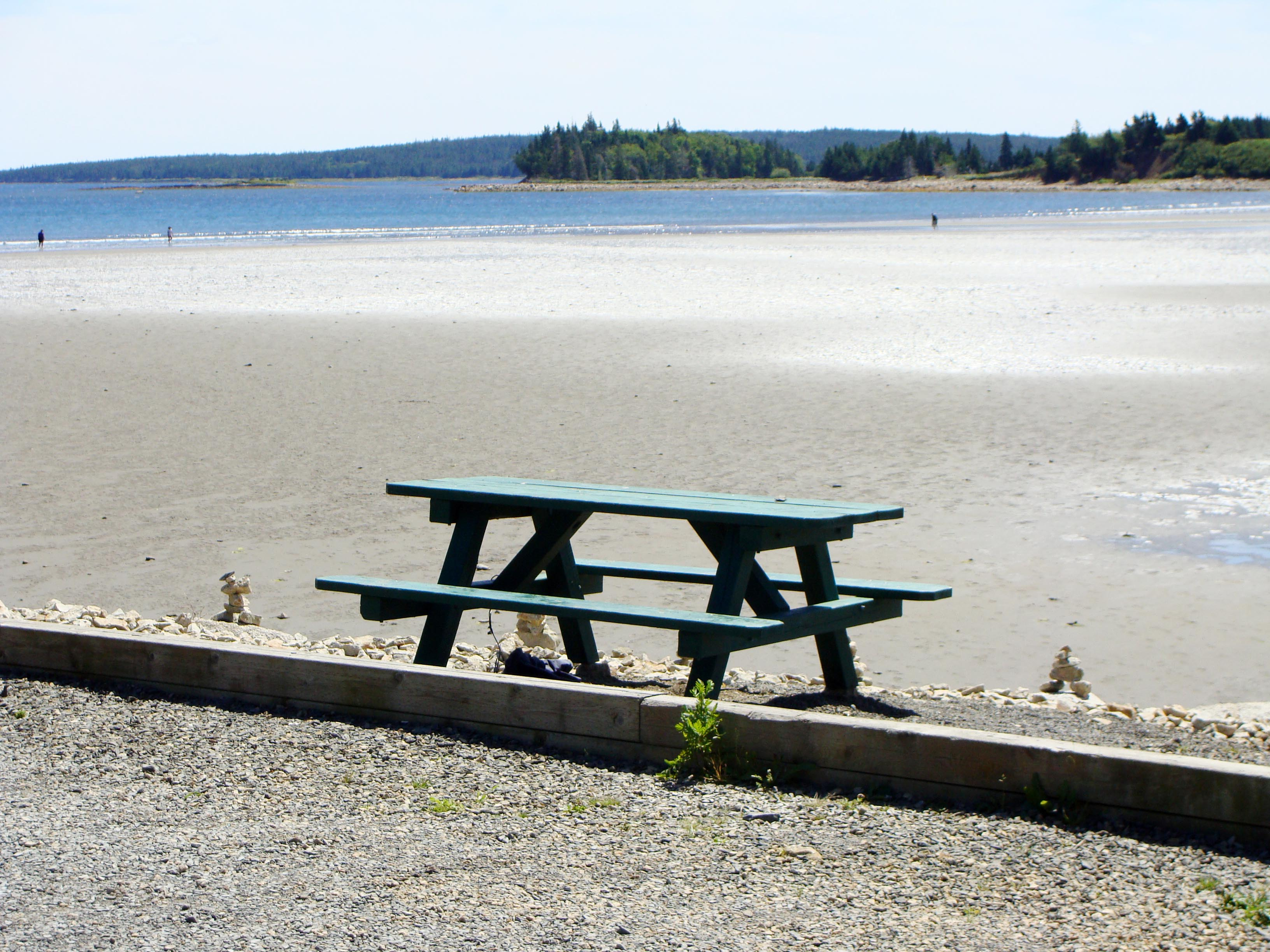
- Rose Bay Beach, also known as Sand Dollar Beach

- Location within Nova Scotia
- Coordinates: 44°17′53.65″N 64°18′19.84″W
- Country: Canada
- Province: Nova Scotia
- Municipality: Lunenburg Municipality
- Elevation: 0 m (0 ft)
- Highest elevation: 119 m (390 ft)
- Lowest elevation: 0 m (0 ft)
- Time zone: UTC-4 (AST)
  - Summer (DST): UTC-3 (ADT)
- Canadian Postal code: B0J 2X0
- Area code: 902
- Telephone Exchanges: 764, 766
- NTS Map: 021A08
- GNBC Code: CBGKE
- Website: www.modl.ca

Rose Bay is a community in the Canadian province of Nova Scotia, located in Lunenburg County.

== Notable people ==
- Ines Torelli (1931-2019), Swiss actress
