= Acadian borders =

The borders of Acadia have changed repeatedly throughout its history. More often than not, they were ignored, poorly defined, or confused with other boundaries. Acadia officially ceased to exist as a political entity in 1763. Nevertheless, the Acadian people endured, and their territory continued to evolve, influencing—and still influencing—the definition of Acadia. This territory is partly associated with the Acadian diaspora. Some of Acadia’s former boundaries persist or have shaped modern borders, notably portions of the Canada–United States border. Uncertainties surrounding these historical borders continue to have consequences, including contributing to the Aroostook War.

== Evolution of Acadia’s borders ==
=== Origins ===
Several Indigenous peoples successively occupied the territory that would become Acadia. The most recent before European contact were the Maliseet, Mi'kmaq, and Abenaki, whose cultures developed from the 6th century CE onward. Martins Point is generally regarded as the boundary between Maliseet and Mi'kmaq territory, while Lepreau Point marked the divide between the Maliseet and the Passamaquoddy. Portages connected these territories, and the peoples belonged to the Wabanaki Confederacy. In any case, these boundaries were fluid because the territories were not permanently occupied; the economy was based on hunting and fishing.

Indigenous boundaries had little or no impact on subsequent European borders. However, the distribution of Indigenous nations was frequently shown on maps, and tribal names were sometimes used in place of territorial ones.

=== Early European exploration ===
The Vikings reached North America around the year 1000 and named three regions—Helluland, Markland, and Vinland—whose exact locations and extents remain unknown. In any event, none of their boundaries survived their departure.

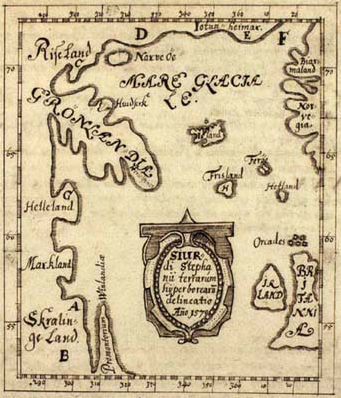
The 1570 Skálholt Map showing Viking possessions.

Probable route of Viking explorers.

Several largely unsubstantiated theories exist about early pre-Columbian exploration and settlement of Acadia, including voyages by the Irish saint Saint Brendan around 530, the Welsh prince Madog around 1170, Malians in the 12th–13th centuries, the Knights Templar in the 14th century, the Zeno brothers around 1390, and the Chinese admiral Zheng He in 1421. Phantom islands and imaginary places such as Drogeo and Norumbega are associated with these voyages. Norumbega appeared on maps until the early 17th century; its last mention came in 1613 when Pierre Biard wrote that the St. Croix River flowed through it.

In any case, Christopher Columbus reached the Americas in 1492. The papal bull Inter caetera (1493) granted Spain all lands west and south of a line 100 leagues (418 km (260 mi)) west of the Azores and Cape Verde. The Treaty of Tordesillas (1494) moved the line to 370 leagues (1,770 km (1,100 mi)) west of Cape Verde. In both cases, the future Acadia fell within the Spanish sphere, but the demarcation was ignored by other European powers, including Spain and Portugal, and soon fell into disuse.

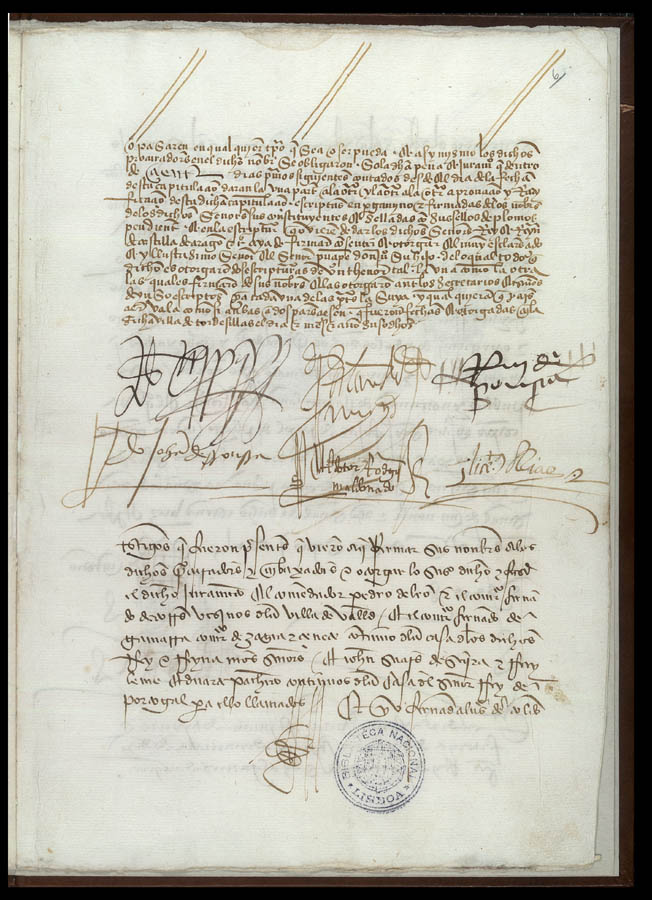
The Treaty of Tordesillas.

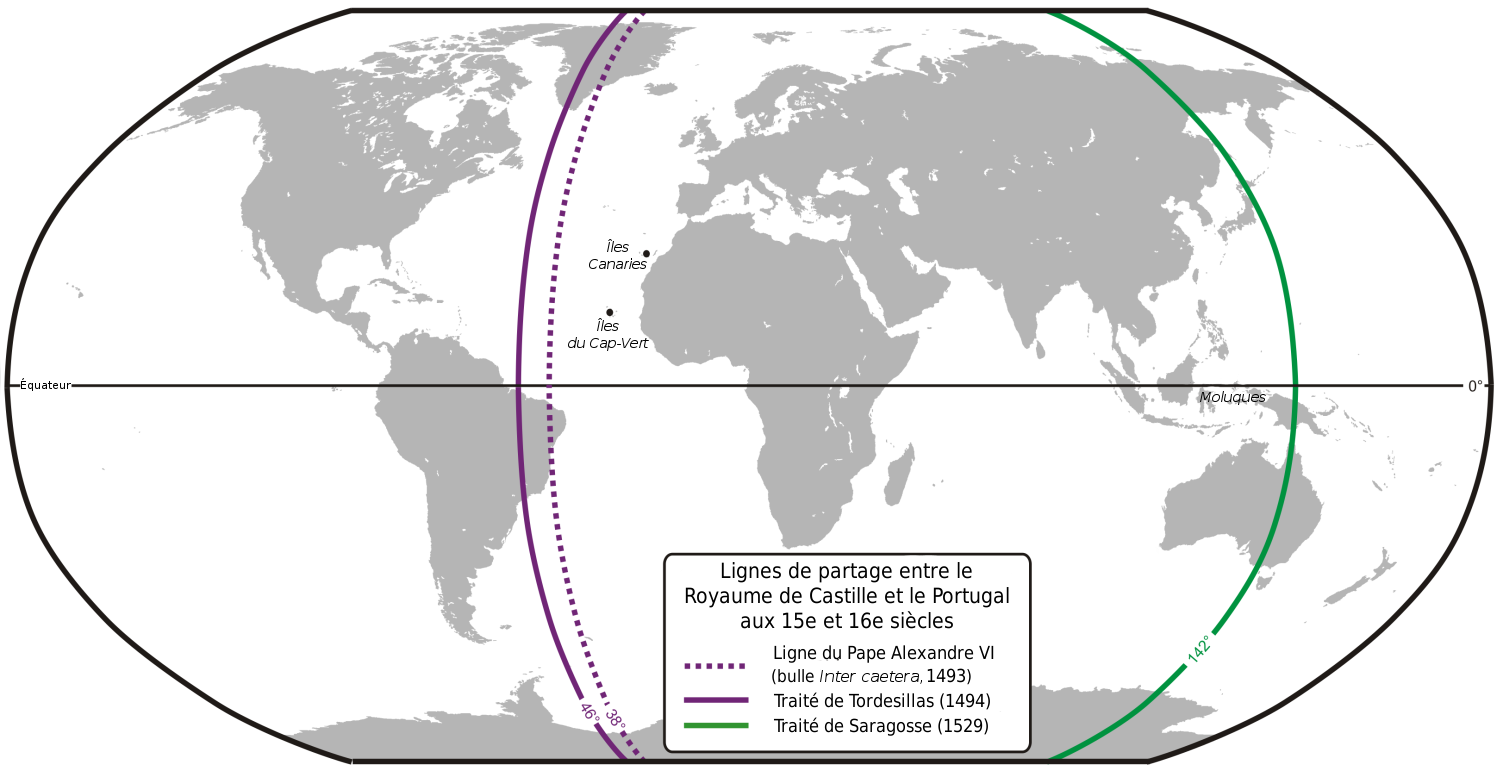
Demarcation line according to Inter caetera and Tordesillas (Spain west, Portugal east).

Many explorers visited the region in the 15th and early 16th centuries, including John Cabot for England in 1497 and João Álvares Fagundes for Portugal around 1520. Fagundes explored and named several areas, including Newfoundland, present-day Nova Scotia, and Saint Pierre and Miquelon; he may have claimed them for Portugal, though this is unlikely. Early explorers initially mistook the land for Asia but soon realized they had found a new continent and sought a passage to Asia. Maps of the period often used flags to denote possession, but boundaries remained vague. Exploration did not necessarily confer legal possession but formed the basis for future claims. European fishermen were already familiar with the coasts.

=== French Acadia (1604–1713) ===
French Acadia refers to the period from its founding in 1604 until its final conquest by Britain in 1713. It was not always called Acadia during this time, nor was it continuously under French sovereignty.

==== Official status within the Kingdom of France ====
New France is sometimes considered to comprise only the Canada colony or to include Acadia as well. In practice, however, Acadia remained distinct, with its own governor. Orders were supposed to pass through the Governor General of New France, but the French court sometimes dealt directly with Acadia’s governor. Relations between Acadia and Canada were often tense, characteristic of two separate colonies; even Placentia (Plaisance) refused cooperation.

A spirit of independence animated both Acadia and Canada. The Abenaki lived around the Penobscot River, forming a buffer zone between Acadia and New England.

==== Recognition ====
Spanish and Portuguese presence prevented England and France from colonizing south of the 30th parallel north. The English focused around the 37th parallel and the French around the 45th, though the French were slow to establish settlements.

The name “Acadia” was probably first used in 1524 by Giovanni da Verrazzano, exploring for France, to describe the Delmarva Peninsula; only in the 17th century did it refer to a region roughly corresponding to the modern Maritime provinces.

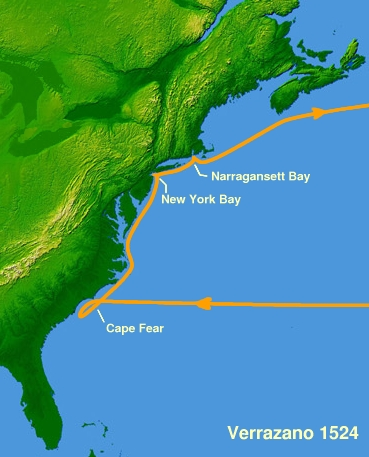
Verrazzano’s voyage.

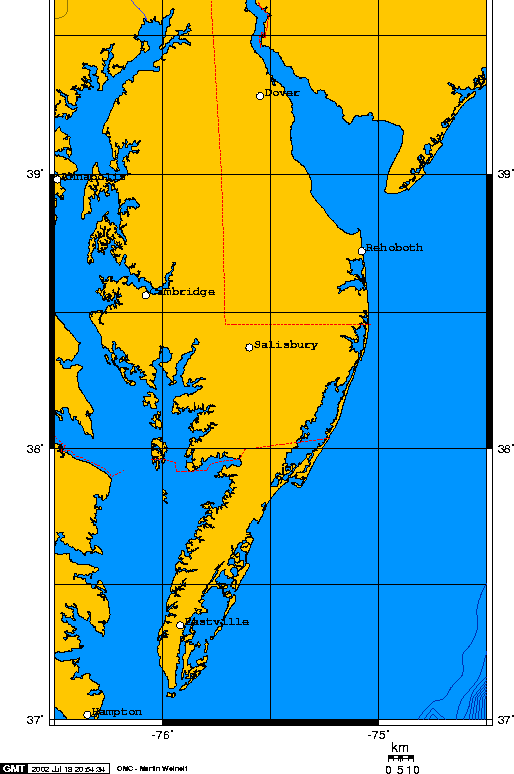
Delmarva Peninsula, the first region called Acadia.

France sent Jacques Cartier in 1534 before formally claiming the territory. Humphrey Gilbert took possession of Newfoundland (northeast of Acadia) for England in 1583, based on Cabot’s voyage. The Colony of Virginia was chartered the same year without defined limits. France then considered Acadia to include the Gulf of St. Lawrence coast extending southwest to an undetermined boundary with Virginia.

In 1603, Henry IV of France, citing Verrazzano’s exploration, granted Pierre Dugua, Sieur de Mons a fur-trade monopoly and instructed him to found a colony between the 40th and 46th parallels—intended to run from Cape Cod to Cape Breton Island but actually bisecting the island. This ignored English explorations in Maine in 1602–1603. It was likely the first use of parallels as boundaries in Canadian history.

Gulf of St. Lawrence.

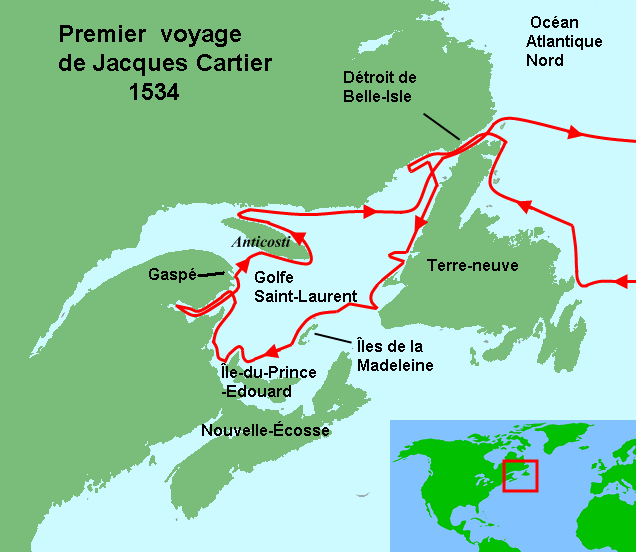
Jacques Cartier’s first voyage (1534).

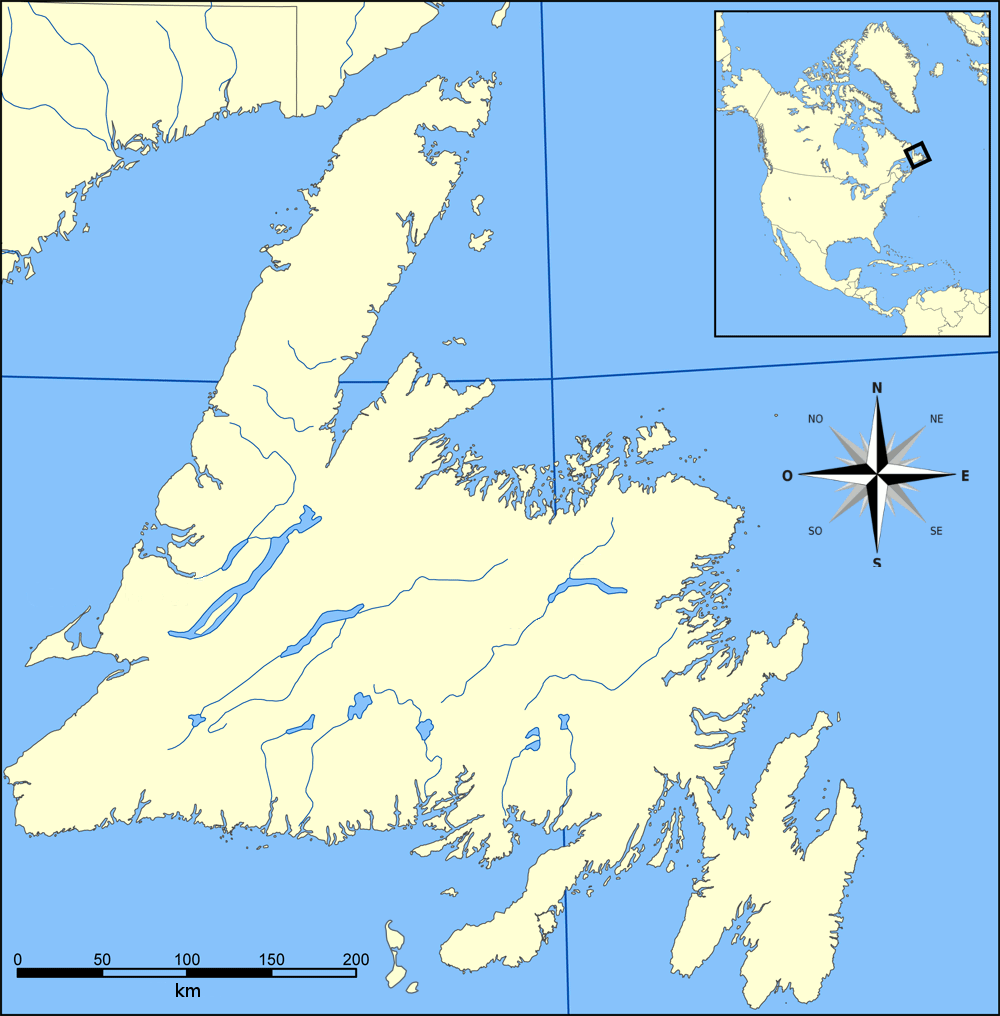
Newfoundland.

Modern Virginia.

==== Early settlement attempts ====
Aymar de Chaste received the New France trade monopoly in 1603 and sent François Gravé du Pont and Samuel de Champlain, but no settlement was founded.

Acadia was founded in 1604 by Pierre Dugua de Mons on Sainte-Croix Island, now in Maine near the northern shore of the Bay of Fundy. An earlier colony on Sable Island (1598–1603) had failed. Acadia became one of the first regions in North America to be accurately mapped, by Champlain in 1604. The Sainte-Croix settlement failed, and Port-Royal was established in 1605 on the southern shore of the Bay of Fundy.

Acadia 1604–1607, showing Champlain’s and Dugua’s expeditions.

Acadia 1610–1613, showing settlements and Indigenous nations.

==== Beginning of hostilities ====
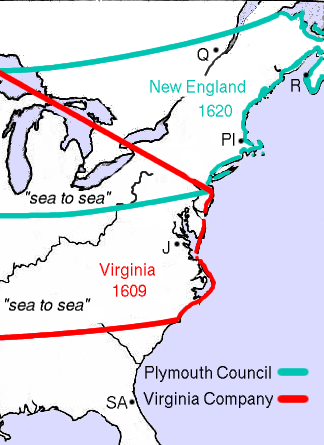
Borders (green) of the Plymouth Council for New England.

From the outset, England coveted Acadia’s strategic position and repeatedly attacked it. Most English attacks aimed to push Acadia’s border eastward to the Kennebec River and then the Penobscot River. The French mainly tried to disrupt Boston. The French founded no permanent settlements west of the St. Croix River. Most attacks failed or were abandoned due to poor organization or weather. Governors frequently moved the capital and received little military or financial support, contributing to instability.

In 1606, the Virginia Company received a charter from James I for Virginia between the 34th and 45th parallels, ignoring Acadia’s boundaries. The English founded the short-lived Popham Colony in Maine in 1607. When the French settled Mount Desert Island in 1613, the English destroyed it and captured Port-Royal, basing their claim on Cabot’s voyage.

In 1620, James I replaced the Virginia Company with the Plymouth Council for New England, granting land from the Atlantic to the Pacific between the 40th and 48th parallels—encompassing Acadia and the nascent Canada colony. The modern 49th parallel border is coincidental.

==== Nova Scotia for the first time (1621–1632) ====
From 1613, Scotland claimed a colony called Nova Scotia, roughly covering French Acadia east of the St. Croix River and a line drawn due north. In 1621, James VI and I granted it to his favorite Sir William Alexander. Part of the present Canada–US border derives from this grant. It was the first North American territory delimited by precise, identifiable geographical features.

Later in 1621, the Plymouth Council granted Alexander the “territory of Sagadahock” between the St. Croix and Kennebec rivers. In 1622, John Mason and Ferdinando Gorges received land between the Kennebec and Merrimack, named the Province of Maine; it was split in 1629 into Maine and New Hampshire.

In 1627, the Company of One Hundred Associates received a monopoly over New France, defined as stretching from Newfoundland to the Great Lakes, the Arctic Circle to Florida—thus including Acadia and English possessions. War broke out that year between France and England. The Treaty of Saint-Germain-en-Laye (1632) partially ended it and returned Acadia to France.

The Nova Scotia grant was reconfirmed in 1625 and 1633. The colony was divided into New Alexandria (north) and New Caledonia (south) across the Isthmus of Chignecto and Bay of Fundy—resembling modern New Brunswick and Nova Scotia without direct connection. Scottish settlers arrived in 1629 at Cape Breton and Port-Royal.

Meanwhile, Canada was briefly granted to Alexander in 1628; the grant lapsed after 1632. Charles de Saint-Étienne de La Tour received a baronetcy in 1630 from Cape Fourchu (near Yarmouth) to Mirliguèche (near Lunenburg), implying this was the sole “Acadia”.

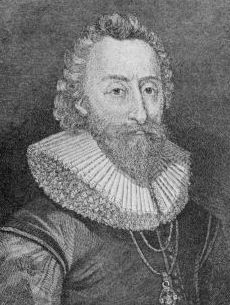
Sir William Alexander.

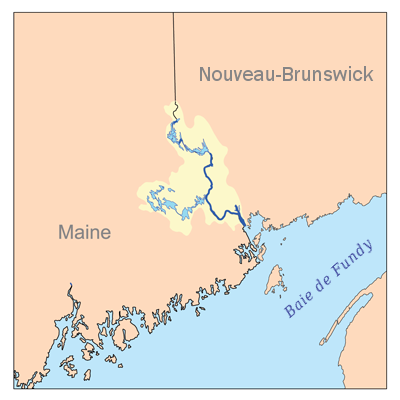
St. Croix River with modern borders.

=== British Acadia (1713–1763) ===
British Acadia describes the region of Acadia under British control from 1713 to 1763.

==== Treaty of Utrecht and its interpretation (1713) ====
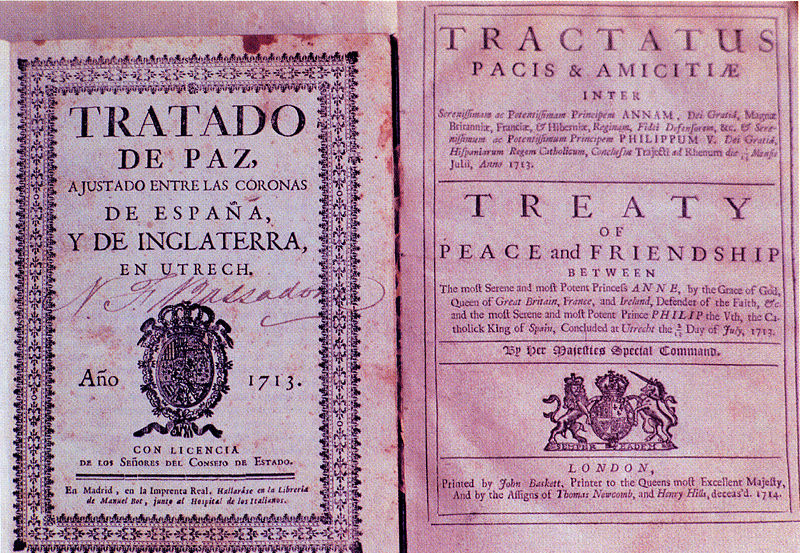
The Treaty of Utrecht.

The British conquest of Acadia was formalized by the Treaty of Utrecht in 1713.

The Most Christian King shall restore to the Queen of Great Britain, on the day of the exchange of the ratifications of this present Treaty of Peace, letters and authentic acts, which shall serve as evidence of the cession, in perpetuity, to the Queen and to the Crown of Great Britain, of the island of Saint Christopher, which shall henceforth be possessed alone by British subjects; of Nova Scotia, or Acadia, in its entirety, according to its ancient limits, as also of the town of Port Royal, now called Annapolis Royal; and generally of all that depends on the said lands and islands of the said country, with the sovereignty [...].

In practice, France retained Île Royale and Île Saint-Jean, along with other holdings such as Anticosti Island and fishing rights on the French Shore of Newfoundland. (Note: These latter two territories were not originally part of Acadia but became associated with it later. The French had held the colony of Placentia in Newfoundland since 1660.) The treaty equated Acadia with Nova Scotia, despite France's longstanding claim that the colony extended to the Kennebec River or at least the Penobscot River. From the perspective of Massachusetts, the treaty restored the territory of Sagadahock and Nova Scotia, while Nova Scotia's new governor viewed the colony as encompassing all of former Acadia with its western boundary at the St. George River. Great Britain regarded Acadia (and thus Nova Scotia) as extending north to the St. Lawrence River. France, however, limited Acadia (and Nova Scotia) to the southern portion of the peninsula, arguing that it was not the pre-1710 Acadia but a different one "according to its ancient limits." These divergent views of Acadia were reflected in maps produced by both powers. The British did not immediately occupy the continental portion of the territory after the treaty's signing, implying continued French sovereignty there.

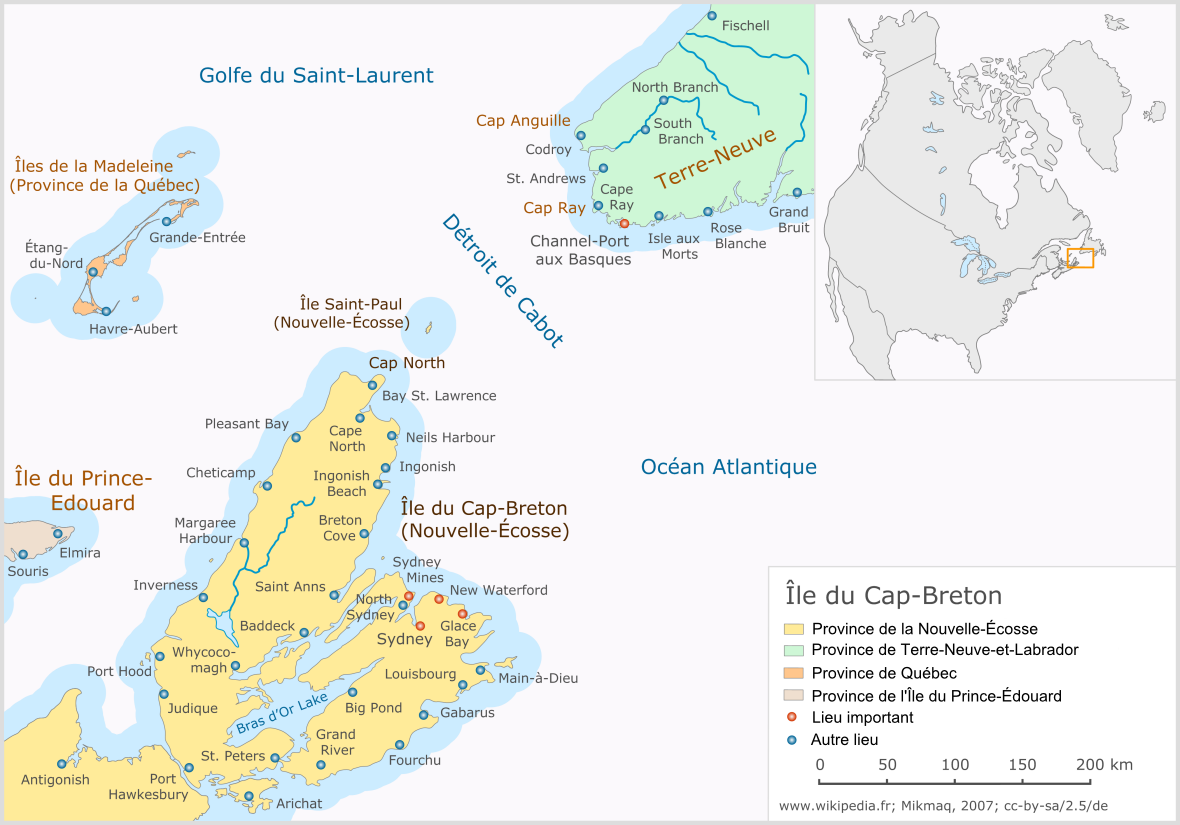
Île Royale, now Cape Breton Island.

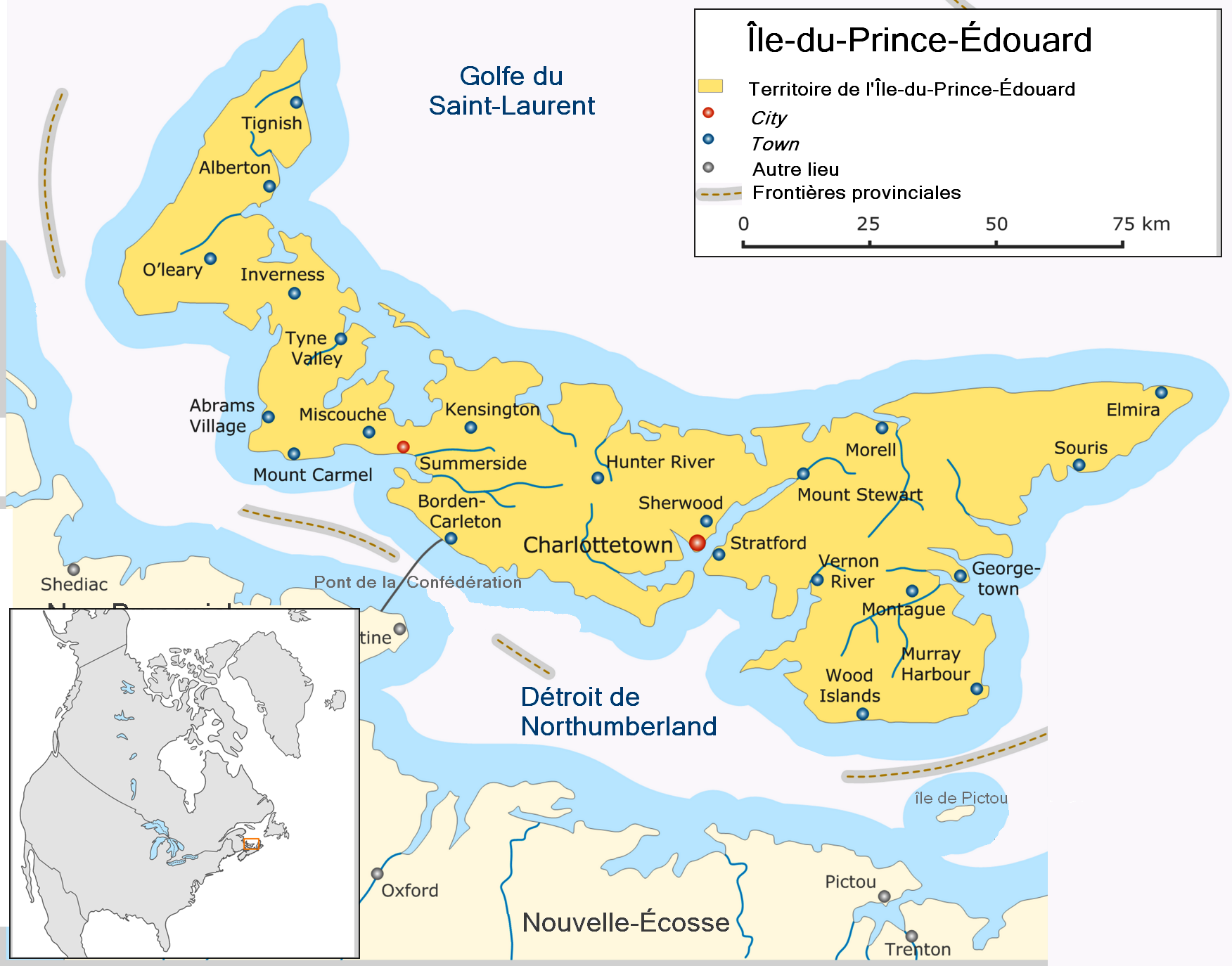
Île Saint-Jean, now Prince Edward Island.

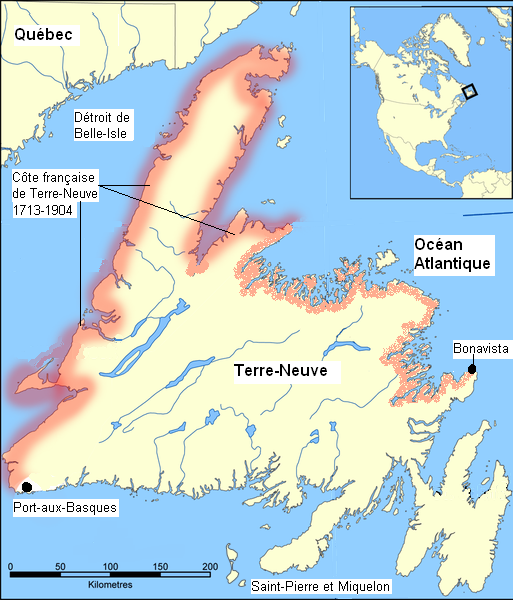
The French Shore of Newfoundland, 1713–1904.

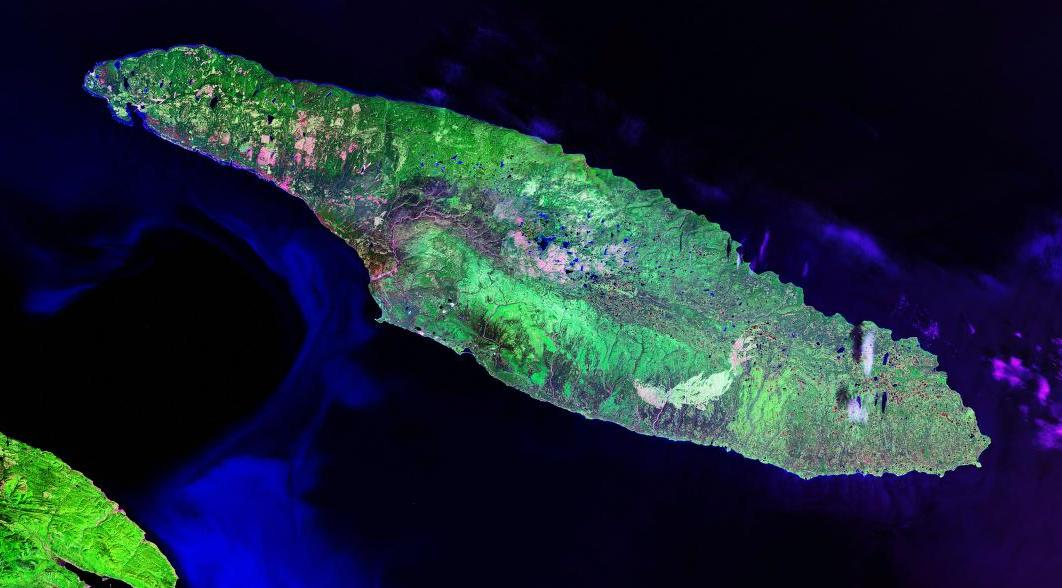
Anticosti Island.

The French began claiming the continental portion around 1720. In 1751, they built Fort Beauséjour on the north bank of the Missaguash River, while the British constructed Fort Lawrence on the south bank, effectively recognizing the French position de facto; this marked the third time the Isthmus of Chignecto served as a boundary.

Despite boundary uncertainties, the English granted the township of Harrington along the Saint John River in 1732, though the grant was soon forgotten.

==== Treaty of Aix-la-Chapelle and boundary commission (1748–1755) ====
In 1748, the Treaty of Aix-la-Chapelle (1748) effected no changes to the respective positions. The treaty provided for a bilateral commission in 1750 to delimit Acadia's boundaries, which yielded no results and was dissolved. Nonetheless, the commission's conferences and published volumes preserved many lost or rare documents.

The boundary between Massachusetts and Nova Scotia remained practically undefined; Massachusetts proposed several solutions to Nova Scotia, which deferred the matter to the Crown. In 1762, the two colonies agreed not to grant lands in the undefined area until the boundary was clarified.

A bilateral commission was also established to delimit the boundary at the Isthmus of Chignecto, but it too failed. The Acadians were deported between 1755 and 1763, but one-third had returned by the end of the 18th century. The English forced returning Acadians to settle in small, dispersed groups; most former Acadian lands were granted to English settlers.

=== Partition of Acadia ===
In 1763, France ceded its North American possessions to Great Britain via the Treaty of Paris (1763), which was unambiguous and ended disputes over Acadia's boundaries. The only territory France gained was Saint Pierre and Miquelon, intended as a refuge for its fishermen. (Note: Saint Pierre and Miquelon was not originally part of Acadia but became associated with it later.)

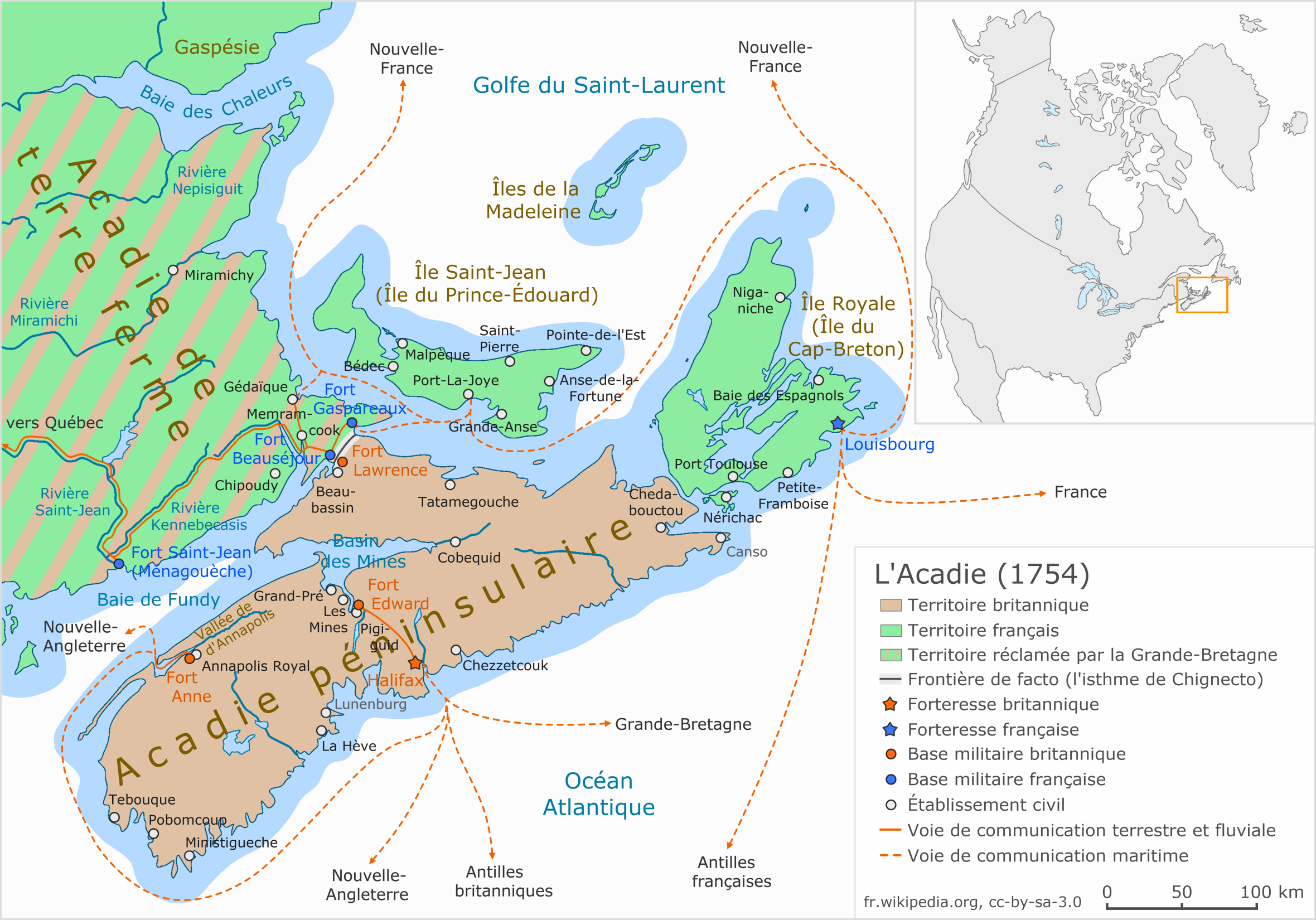
Acadia's boundaries in 1754.

Current boundaries of Saint Pierre and Miquelon.

The St. Croix River and a line due north formed Nova Scotia's new boundary—the same as that of William Alexander's Nova Scotia in 1621. The territory of Sagadahock thus defaulted to Massachusetts possession.

All internal French-era boundaries in Acadia were dissolved. Newfoundland was granted all coastline from the Saguenay River in the west to Hudson Strait in the north, including islands such as Anticosti and the Magdalen Islands. Île Royale and Île Saint-Jean were annexed to Nova Scotia; Governor Montague Wilmot's commission defined their boundaries. By expanding Nova Scotia, the British aimed to consolidate their presence and assert authority over continental Acadian territories claimed since the Treaty of Utrecht.

The Province of Quebec, replacing Canada, was created later in 1763. Its southern boundary ran along the 45th parallel north, then north along the highlands (the Appalachian Mountains) dividing the St. Lawrence River watershed from that of the Atlantic Ocean, and finally east along the north shore of the Chaleur Bay to Cap des Rosiers. This deprived Quebec of the Gaspé Peninsula. (Note: The exact definition of Canada, like that of Acadia, was uncertain. Strategic considerations prompted the British to reduce the colony's size.) The Quebec Act of 1774 confirmed this boundary but granted other lands, including those ceded to Newfoundland in 1763. Unrest in the Thirteen Colonies prompted British expansion of Quebec's territory, but this decision contributed to the American Revolution. The texts overlooked that the "highlands" do not approach Chaleur Bay in this manner and ignored the Restigouche River, which flows into the bay rather than the St. Lawrence or Atlantic, leaving part of the boundary undefined. Contemporary maps depicted the Restigouche farther north and shorter than in reality, explaining the confusion. Most cartographers resolved this by drawing a straight line east from the highlands to the Restigouche's mouth, while Des Barres' more accurate map diverted the boundary around the river's source and then followed the shortest path to Chaleur Bay. In any case, Quebec's southern boundary automatically became the northern boundary of Massachusetts and Nova Scotia.

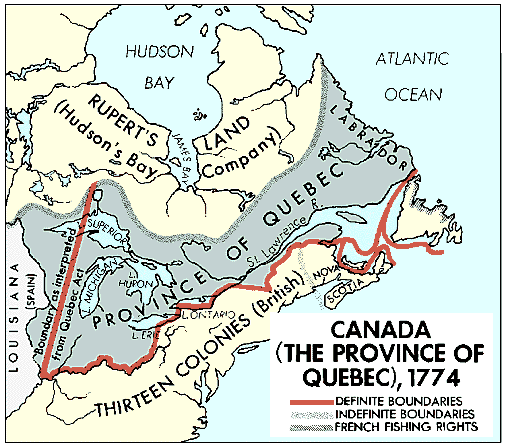
Quebec's boundaries in 1774.

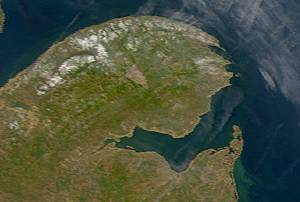
Satellite view of Chaleur Bay and Gaspé Peninsula.

Massachusetts continued claiming the territory of Sagadahock (lands east to the St. Croix River), while Nova Scotia claimed lands west to the Penobscot River as heir to Acadia. However, the Treaty of Paris and Quebec Act transferred northern Sagadahock to Quebec. Governor Wilmot's 1763 commission held that Nova Scotia's western boundary ran from Cape Sable through the Bay of Fundy to the St. Croix's mouth, then due north to Quebec's southern boundary. This created a "north angle," frequently mentioned thereafter. Notably, the commission stated Nova Scotia once extended to the Penobscot, a phrasing that avoided finality amid ongoing boundary disputes.

Nova Scotia had been divided into counties in 1759, with all territory north of Kings County, Nova Scotia—including present-day New Brunswick—falling within Cumberland County, Nova Scotia. The Saint John River valley was separated from Cumberland in 1765 to form Sunbury County. A boundary between the counties was established in 1770. Sunbury's western boundary was described as running due north from the St. Croix's source to the Saint John River, then to Quebec's southern boundary. This overlapped part of present-day Maine, as reaching Quebec from the Saint John required veering far west near the Chaudière River's source.

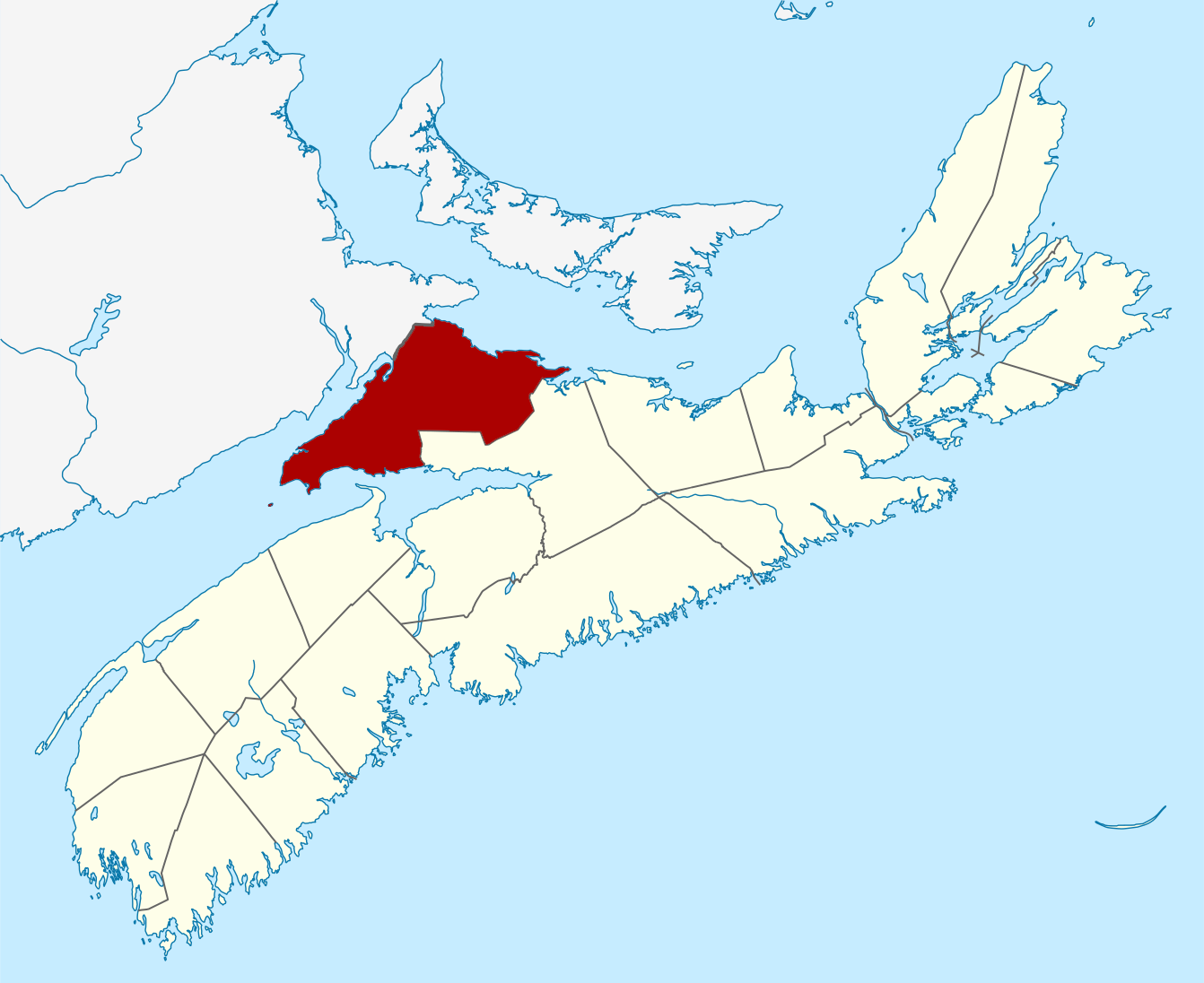
Modern Cumberland County.

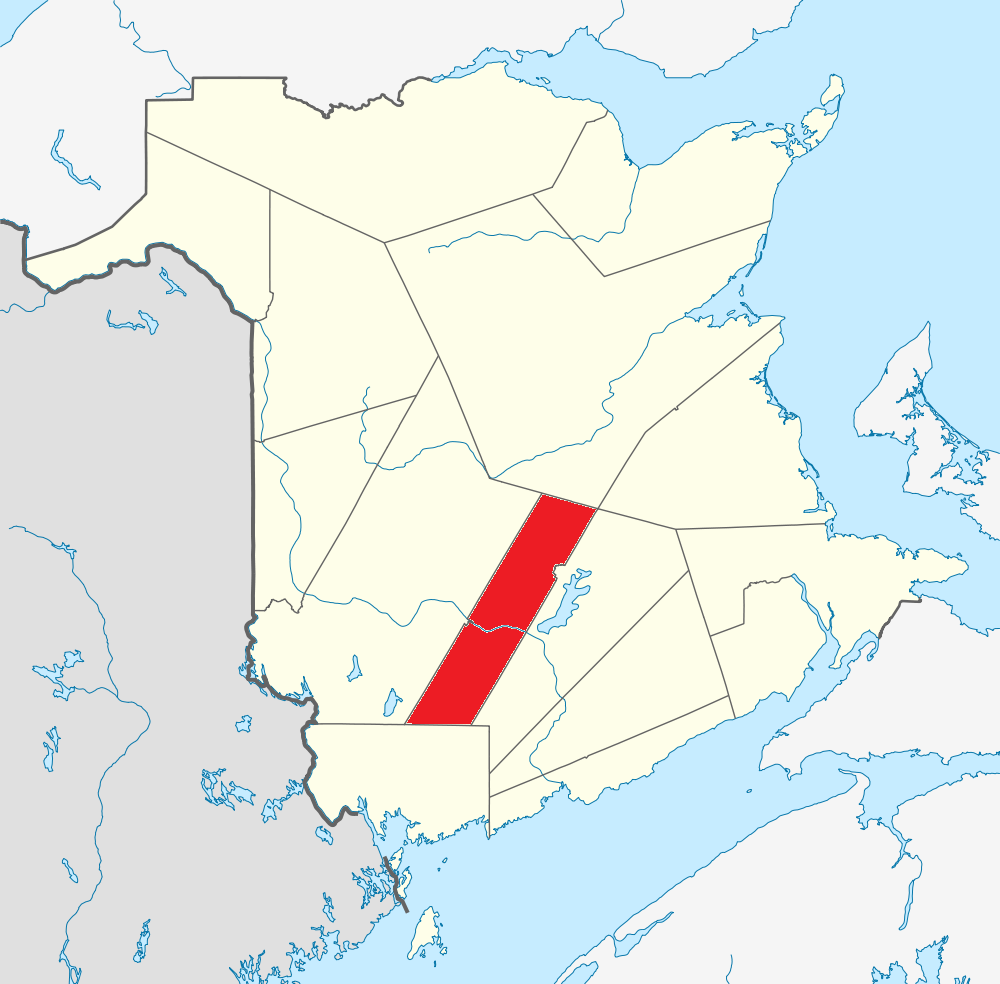
Modern Sunbury County.

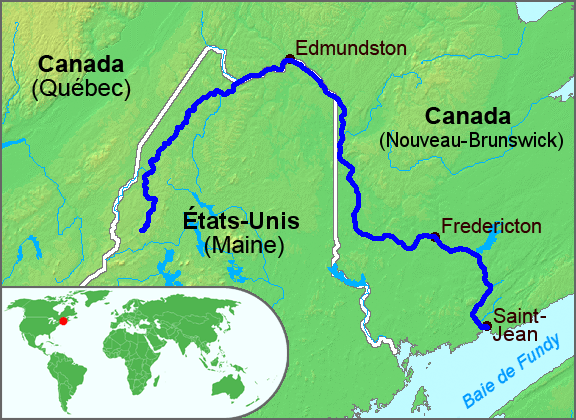
Saint John River.

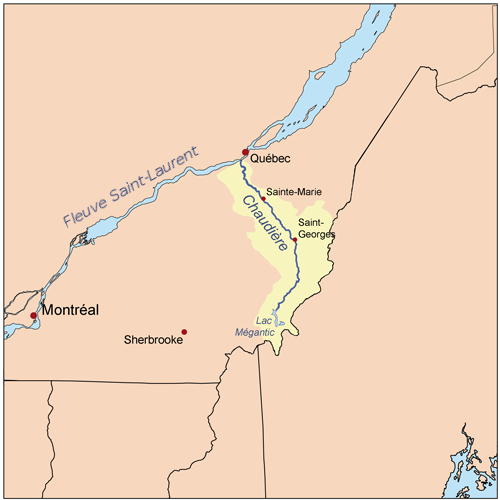
Chaudière River.

Île Saint-Jean was nearly depopulated in 1758 during the Expulsion of the Acadians before being surveyed in 1764 and granted to various English lords in 1767. At their request, the island was separated from Nova Scotia in 1769 and renamed Prince Edward Island in 1798. New Brunswick was separated from Nova Scotia in 1784. Île Royale, renamed Cape Breton Island, became a separate province in 1784 but was rejoined to Nova Scotia in 1820.

=== Summary ===
==== Acadia ====
Name	Duration	Sovereignty	Origin
Acadia	1604–1620 (1632 for the French)	Kingdom of France (1328–1792)	Explorations of Giovanni da Verrazzano (1524)
New England	1620–1621	Kingdom of England	Grant of the Plymouth Council for New England
Nova Scotia	1621–1632	Kingdom of Scotland	Grant to William Alexander
Acadia	1632–1654 (1664 for the French)	Kingdom of France (1328–1792)	Treaty of Saint-Germain-en-Laye (1632)
Nova Scotia	1654–1667	Commonwealth of England, Kingdom of England	Invasion by Robert Sedgwick, Treaty of Westminster (1654)
Acadia	1667–1674	Kingdom of France (1328–1792)	Treaty of Breda (1667)
New Holland	1674–1678	Dutch Republic	Invasion by Jurriaen Aernoutsz
Acadia	1678–1691	Kingdom of France (1328–1792)	Treaty of Nijmegen
Massachusetts	1691–1696	Kingdom of England	Invasion by William Phips
Nova Scotia	1696–1697	Kingdom of England	Separation from Massachusetts
Acadia	1697–1713 (1763 according to France)	Kingdom of France (1328–1792)	Treaty of Ryswick
Nova Scotia	1713–present	Kingdom of Great Britain	Treaty of Utrecht

==== Territory of Sagadahock ====
Name	Duration	Sovereignty	Origin
Territory of Sagadahock	1664–1667	Kingdom of England	Grant by Charles II to the Duke of York
Acadia	1667–1674	Kingdom of France (1328–1792)	Treaty of Breda (1667)
Territory of Sagadahock	1674–1678	Kingdom of England	Restoration of grant to the Duke of York
Acadia	1678–1691	Kingdom of France (1328–1792)	Treaty of Nijmegen
Massachusetts	1690–1691	Kingdom of England	Invasion by William Phips
Nova Scotia	1691–1696	Kingdom of England	Separation from Massachusetts
Acadia	1696–1713	Kingdom of France (1328–1792)	Treaty of Ryswick
Territory of Sagadahock	1713–1763	Kingdom of England	Treaty of Utrecht
Massachusetts	1763–present	Kingdom of England	Treaty of Paris (1763)

==== Partition of Acadia ====
Name	Duration	Sovereignty	Origin	Portion
Île Royale	1713–1763	Kingdom of France (1328–1792)	Treaty of Utrecht	Gulf of St. Lawrence islands
(Canada) Nova Scotia	Since 1713	United Kingdom then Canada	Treaty of Utrecht	Peninsular portion and later Île Royale/Cape Breton Island
Territory of Sagadahock	1713–1763	United Kingdom	Treaty of Utrecht	Portion west of St. Croix River
(United States) Massachusetts	1763–1820	United Kingdom then United States	Treaty of Paris (1763)	Territory of Sagadahock
(Canada) Prince Edward Island	Since 1769	United Kingdom then Canada		Former Île Saint-Jean
Province of Quebec	1774–1791	United Kingdom	Quebec Act	Gaspé, Magdalen Islands, north of Sagadahock territory
(Canada) New Brunswick	Since 1784	United Kingdom then Canada		Continental portion east of St. Croix River and south of Chaleur Bay
Cape Breton Island	1784–1820	United Kingdom		Former Île Royale
Lower Canada	1791–1841	United Kingdom	Constitutional Act 1791	Gaspé, Magdalen Islands, north of Sagadahock territory
(United States) Maine	Since 1820	United States	Missouri Compromise	Territory of Sagadahock
Canada (Province of Canada)	1841–1867	United Kingdom	Act of Union 1840	Gaspé, Magdalen Islands, north of Sagadahock territory
(Canada) Quebec	Since 1867	Canada	British North America Acts	Gaspé, Magdalen Islands, north of Sagadahock territory

== Distribution of the Acadian population ==
The distribution of the Acadian population has not always been tied to borders but has influenced their definition.

=== French Acadia ===
Many colonization projects had to be canceled or delayed, due in part to shortages of supplies and funds; even observers, until the early 18th century, spoke of Acadia as a place to be colonized. The colonization of Acadia truly began under the impetus of Isaac de Razilly in 1632. Settlement started at Port-Royal and expanded to Beaubassin in 1671, the Mines in 1682, and subsequently to Pisiquid and the Trois-Rivières. The rest of the territory remained sparsely populated.

=== British Acadia ===
In 1755, the governor of Nova Scotia, Charles Lawrence, captured Fort Beauséjour from the French and began the Expulsion of the Acadians. Until 1763, the territories adjacent to Nova Scotia were annexed, and Acadians were deported to New England. Many others managed to flee to Canada, Île Saint-Jean (present-day Prince Edward Island), or hide among the Indigenous peoples. Several colonies refused these prisoners, who were then deported to England or returned to Nova Scotia. Île Saint-Jean was nearly depopulated in 1758. Two-thirds were deported to France, while others sought refuge at Ristigouche or Quebec. Refugees in England were expatriated to France in 1763. Some Acadians sought refuge in Saint Pierre and Miquelon but were almost all deported in 1778.

=== Since 1763 ===
After the Expulsion of the Acadians, Acadia transitioned from a defined territory to a set of communities with fluid borders.

After the signing of the Treaty of Paris (1763) in 1763, Acadians moved to the West Indies, France, Louisiana, and Quebec, but mostly to Nova Scotia. About 12,000 New England Planters had already settled in former Acadian villages, and the law prohibited Acadians from forming large communities. They could settle on reserved lands among Anglophones or found new villages in remote corners of former Acadia, such as Cape Breton Island, Prince Edward Island, or the territory that became New Brunswick in 1784—which most did. Among all the former core Acadian villages, only Pobomcoup, the left bank of the Trois-Rivières, and Beaubassin (though the latter hosted few Acadians) were not reserved for Anglophones. Exiles gradually settled in Halifax and along the Strait of Canso, then from 1767 in Baie-Saint-Marie, Tusket, and Pobomcoup, and from 1780 in Chéticamp and Margaree.

Nearly two-thirds of the Acadians in France went to Louisiana in 1785. Their descendants are now called Cajuns.

A group of Acadians from Saint-Malo settled in the Falkland Islands in 1764. Most left the archipelago in the following years, but it seems some families left descendants on these islands as well as in Montevideo, Uruguay.

From 1785, the Madawaska region saw the arrival of Acadians who had to leave the lower Saint John River valley to the United Empire Loyalists. By the end of the 18th century, 36% of Acadians were settled in the Maritime provinces, and their return from exile continued until the 1820s. Until the second half of the 20th century, Maritime settlements expanded along the coasts and into the hinterland. Several factors contributed to population movements, but the most consistent was religious presence. Thus, the construction of a chapel or the establishment of a priest generally meant a community was permanently settled. During this period, the arrival of numerous British immigrants accentuated the minority status of Acadians.

In the 19th century, French fishing families and residents of Saint Pierre and Miquelon settled on the French Shore of Newfoundland, particularly in the Port au Port Peninsula, despite the prohibition of permanent settlements. They were joined by Acadian farmers. The Francophone population then underwent massive cultural assimilation. France lost its fishing rights in 1904.

In the second half of the 20th century, Acadian communities formed in Alberta and the Labrador. They consist mainly of workers attracted by well-paid jobs in the primary sector. This exodus threatens the survival of some Maritime communities.

=== Indigenous territories ===
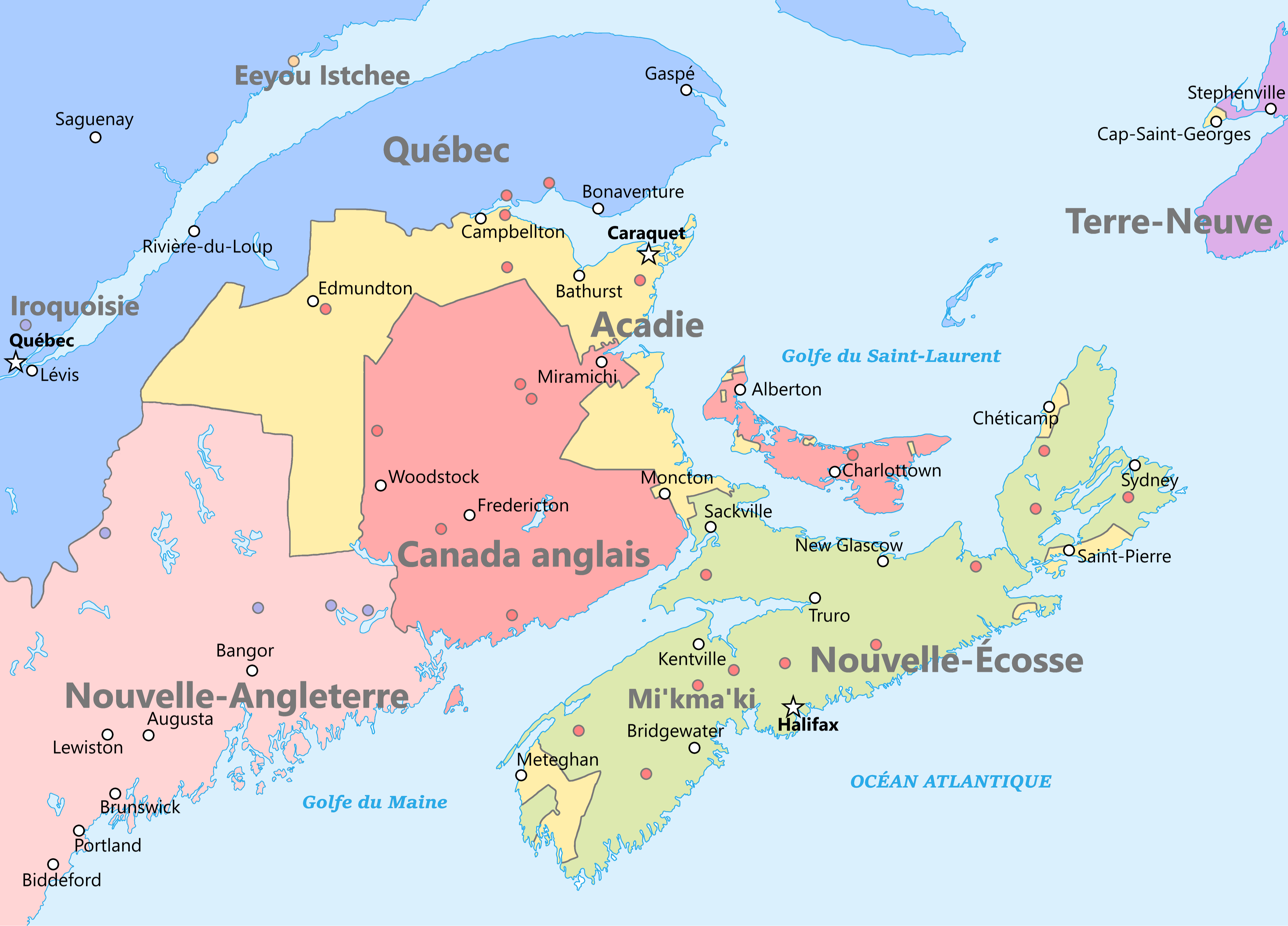
Map of Acadia and its neighboring cultural areas with Mi'kmaq reserves.

During the French regime, France did not recognize Maliseet and Mi'kmaq sovereignty over their territories but ensured they were respected in their use of them. For their part, the Indigenous peoples considered the lands merely lent to the French and Acadians. Although the arrival of Europeans changed Indigenous habits and many died from European diseases, relations were generally cordial, with each population occupying its own territory. Métissage was common but denigrated at the end of the French regime; Acadians married to Indigenous women were more interested in their wife's culture, whereas the stated goal of métissage—promoted by the government—was to assimilate the Indigenous peoples.

The Maliseet and Mi'kmaq still exist and own lands—Indian reserves—some of which are enclaved in Acadia. Some reserves have seen their territory reduced over the years, sometimes illegally. This is one reason several communities seek to reclaim larger territories.

=== Anglophone population and immigrants ===
The immigrant population had little real impact on the definition of Acadia's territory.

== Influence of Acadia's borders to the present day ==
Uncertainties regarding Acadia's borders continue to influence the present and have led to several border conflicts between Canada and the United States, as well as between provinces and states.

=== International border ===
==== American Revolutionary War and Treaty of Paris (1783) ====
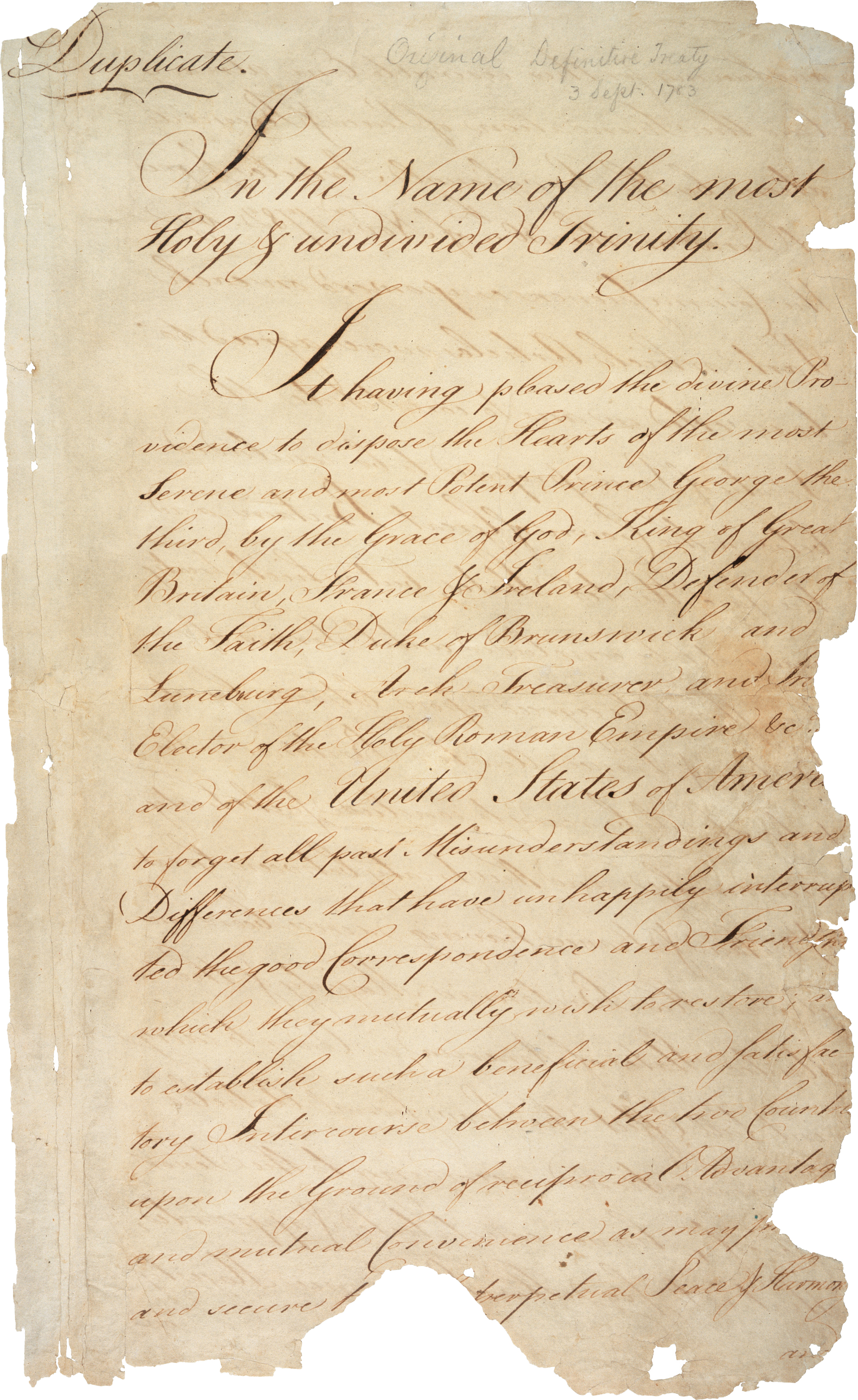
The first page of the Treaty of Paris.

The Mitchell Map.

A provisional treaty was signed in 1782 between the United States and Great Britain. It determined the border with Nova Scotia as beginning at the mouth of the St. Croix River in the Bay of Fundy, ascending its course to its source, and then following a due north line to the northwest angle in the "highlands," essentially the same border given to Nova Scotia by Great Britain in 1763. The commissioners relied on the Mitchell Map of 1755, considered the best of its time. The Treaty of Paris (1783) of 1783 ended the American Revolutionary War and reiterated essentially the same border. From that moment, the northern U.S. border became a source of discord with the United Kingdom and then Canada, persisting to the present day.

==== Search for the St. Croix River ====
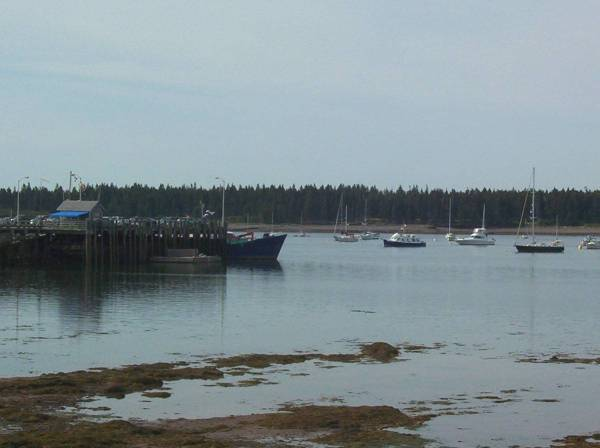
The St. Croix River at its mouth.

The exact location of the St. Croix River was quickly forgotten. The first known topographic description was made in April 1764 by Massachusetts governor Francis Bernard to John Mitchell, tasked with surveying Passamaquoddy Bay and determining the river's exact location. Bernard referred to a waterway then called the Scoodic River, which proved to be the sought-after St. Croix. In June 1764, Mitchell noted in his journal that Indigenous peoples considered the Magaguadavic River the St. Croix; he produced a map whose original has not survived. The Pownall map of 1776 was the first printed map illustrating this theory. Mitchell seems to have misinterpreted Cyprian Southack's 1715 plan, which identified the Magaguadavic as the St. Croix and named the Scoodic the Passamaquoddy River—an error repeated in his report and map. In 1765, Charles Morris was sent on an expedition to Passamaquoddy Bay. He identified the Cobscook River as the St. Croix and Treat Island as Dochet's Island but named the Scoodic as such and left the Magaguadavic unnamed; the wooded true Dochet's Island led him to mistake Treat Island's ruins for the French habitation. According to William Francis Ganong, Morris's main error stemmed from his desire to push Nova Scotia's border as far west as possible. In 1765, Governor Bernard, based on Mitchell's research and Samuel de Champlain's writings, sent a letter to Nova Scotia Governor Wilmot associating the Digdeguash River with the St. Croix; his error likely arose from consulting Champlain's 1632 edition, which had fewer and less accurate maps. In 1772, Thomas Wright produced a detailed regional map identifying the Scoodic as the Great St. Croix River and the Magaguadavic as the Little; in 1797, he testified under oath that he relied on local usage.

Contradictory testimonies emerged at the time. Indigenous peoples supported the Magaguadavic as the St. Croix, a view shared by some local English settlers, while others claimed Indigenous peoples were coerced into this theory, some English said the name was recent, and others maintained the Scoodic and Magaguadavic were once the Great and Little St. Croix Rivers. In 1765, other Indigenous peoples told Morris they once called the Cobscook the St. Croix.

In 1794, Article V of the Jay Treaty provided for a bilateral commission to determine the St. Croix's location. On 25, the three commissioners recognized the Scoodiac and St. Croix as the same waterway; a monument was erected at its source.

==== War of 1812 and Treaty of Ghent (1814) ====
Signing of the Treaty of Ghent.

The Treaty of Ghent, signed in 1814, ended the War of 1812 and was intended to resolve uncertainties from the Treaty of Paris.

==== Aroostook War and Webster–Ashburton Treaty ====
Border uncertainties leading to the Aroostook War.

The ambiguities in the 1783 Treaty of Paris led to escalating tensions over the Maine–New Brunswick border, culminating in the Aroostook War (1838–1839), a bloodless conflict involving militia mobilizations but no combat. The dispute centered on timber-rich lands, with both sides claiming the area based on differing interpretations of the "highlands" and the St. Croix's source. The Webster–Ashburton Treaty of 1842 resolved it, awarding most of the disputed territory to Maine while preserving a British route from Halifax to Quebec, and establishing the modern border.

==== Other treaties and conflicts ====
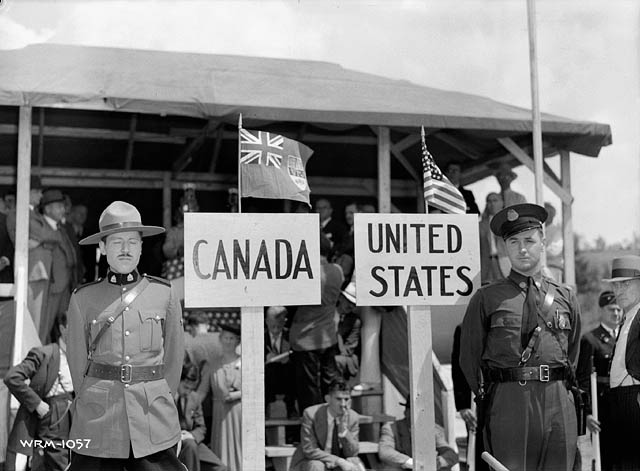
The Canada–U.S. border in 1941.

Canadian sovereignty over Campobello Island was recognized by a convention in 1817. The 1908 treaty between the United States and the United Kingdom established a commission to maintain the border. It stipulated that all previously recognized borders were fixed, ignoring potential geological changes. The 1910 treaty clarified the border in Passamaquoddy Bay, a line from a point between Treat Island and Campobello Island generally south to the middle of the Grand Manan Channel; Pope's Folly Island and the lighthouse between Woodward Point and Cranberry Point were left to the United States. The 1925 treaty shifted the Grand Manan Channel endpoint by 2,383 m (7,818 ft), gaining 9 acres (3.6 ha) for Canada.

The proposed Eastport oil port in Maine created a Canada–U.S. conflict at the turn of the 21st century.

=== Border between Quebec and New Brunswick ===
Topographic map of New Brunswick illustrating modern borders.

The border was fixed in 1851 by a British act and demarcated between 1853 and 1855; it was the first interprovincial border to undergo this process. However, Restigouche River islands are considered part of New Brunswick, but some have disappeared or emerged over time, making this segment uncertain. The easternmost part depends on the status of the Gulf of Saint Lawrence.

The border originates from the 1763 division of the Province of Quebec, following the highlands dividing the St. Lawrence and Atlantic watersheds to Chaleur Bay. Disputes arose in the 19th century over timber and land, leading to arbitration in 1851 under the King of the Netherlands, though the award was partially rejected. Modern issues include resource management and environmental concerns, but the border is stable.

=== Border between New Brunswick and Nova Scotia ===
The border between New Brunswick and Nova Scotia was unofficially recognized by Isthmus of Chignecto residents as early as 1800. Its exact demarcation was difficult because the Missaguash River's source is in a marshy area, but a line was finally demarcated in 1856.

The border follows the Missaguash River from its mouth at Chignecto Bay to a point near Baie Verte, then east to the Petitcodiac River, and north along that river to its source, before proceeding due north. It stems from the 1784 separation of New Brunswick from Nova Scotia and was formalized to resolve logging disputes. No major modern disputes exist.

=== Border between Quebec and Prince Edward Island ===
The border between Quebec and Prince Edward Island is maritime, defined by the Gulf of St. Lawrence. It was established through 1964 and 1972 interprovincial agreements on sea borders, using equidistant lines from the shores. Quebec recognizes these as binding, confirmed by commissions in 1966 and 1991. No significant disputes have arisen, though it could be relevant in Quebec independence scenarios.

=== Border between Quebec and Nova Scotia ===
The border between Quebec and Nova Scotia is also maritime in the Gulf of St. Lawrence, similarly defined by the 1964 and 1972 agreements using equidistant principles. It follows from the 1763 boundaries, with Nova Scotia's northern limit along the 47th parallel in parts of the gulf. Quebec upholds these agreements, with no active disputes.

== Interpretations of Acadian boundaries since 1763 ==
The relationship between Acadians and their territory has long been complex. According to historian Julien Massicotte, the traumatic events of Acadian history—particularly the Deportation of 1755–1763—led many Acadians to identify more strongly with culture, language, and religion than with a fixed geographic space. Scholars such as Massicotte, Nicolas Landry, Nicole Lang, and Elsa Guerry emphasise that territory remains a central, yet constantly redefined, issue in Acadian identity.

For many Atlantic-Canadian Acadians, the existence of “Acadia” is taken as self-evident, even in the absence of official political recognition. Poet Pierre Perrault famously described Acadian geography as a “geography of the soul”, while geographer Cécyle Trépanier has argued that the very ambiguity of the term Acadia sustains its mythic power.

=== Historical development ===
Historical awareness of a distinct Acadian identity emerged at different moments according to scholars: Naomi Griffiths places its origins before the Deportation, while Joseph Yvon Thériault dates it to the 1880s. Regardless, the mid-19th century witnessed a demographic boom and the creation of Acadian institutions during the period known as the Acadian Renaissance. This renaissance partly defined itself against French-Canadian nationalism, emphasising language, culture, and Catholicism over territorial claims.

Two 19th-century historians profoundly shaped early conceptions. François-Edme Rameau de Saint-Père viewed Acadia as wherever Acadians lived, seeing diaspora communities as potential seeds of a new nation. Pascal Poirier stressed blood ties, describing Acadians as a distinct “race”. Massive late-19th-century emigration to the United States reinforced a non-territorial vision, exemplified by the founding of the Société l'Assomption in Massachusetts in 1903.

From the 1920s to the 1950s, a tragic narrative dominated, portraying Acadians as martyrs defined by the Deportation and faith. Historians such as Émile Lauvrière, Antoine Bernard, and Robert Rumilly popularised this “tragic Acadia”, which coexisted with a more concrete regional vision focused on post-Deportation settlements.

The Antigonish Movement and the establishment of social-science education in Memramcook in 1939 gradually shifted perceptions toward contemporary socio-economic realities.

In 1987, New Brunswick geographer Adrien Bérubé proposed four contemporary conceptions of Acadia: historical, diasporic, operational, and prospective. During the 1990s, Cécyle Trépanier conducted hundreds of interviews and concluded that none of Bérubé’s categories fully matched popular perceptions.

=== Bérubé’s four conceptions ===
Bérubé linked each conception to distinct ideologies, symbols, and uses of the Acadian flag and name.

==== Historical Acadia ====
The territory that disappeared irrevocably in 1713 or 1763. Some, including historian Michel Roy and scholar Léon Thériault, consider any post-1763 reference to Acadia paradoxical or an act of faith.

Countries and regions with Acadian diaspora communities

==== Diasporic (genealogical) Acadia ====
Encompasses all descendants of the deported Acadians worldwide (estimated at over three million by genealogist Stephen A. White). Being Acadian is a matter of “blood” or ancestry. Bérubé described it as an “interior homeland” or “moral state” existing in the hearts of “Acadian cousins”. The Acadian flag functions here as a kinship symbol, similar to Scottish tartans.

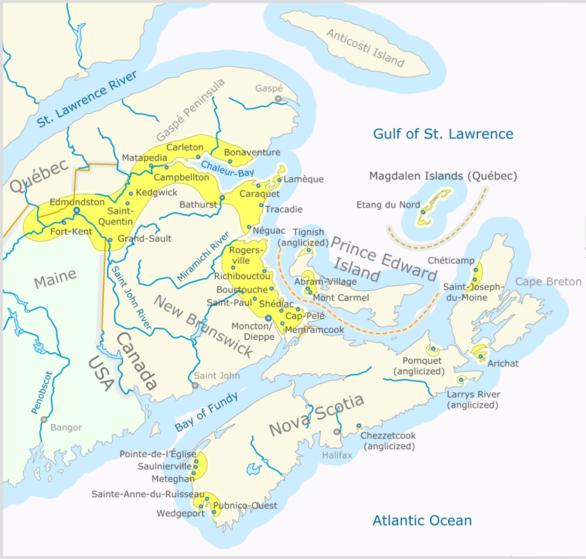
Regions with significant francophone populations in Atlantic Canada

==== Operational Acadia ====
Defines Acadian identity primarily through French language and culture. All francophones in the Maritime provinces are often implicitly considered Acadian. This conception facilitates statistical study using census data. The term “Acadia des Maritimes” (Maritime Acadia) is frequently used synonymously, though Trépanier has called it conceptually “empty of meaning” while acknowledging its rhetorical usefulness. Inclusion of Newfoundland and Labrador remains debated, though the broader label “Acadia de l’Atlantique” has gained currency.

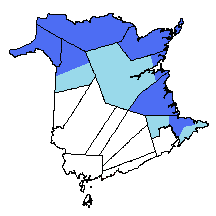
Approximate map of a proposed Acadian province in northern and eastern New Brunswick

==== Prospective (New) Acadia ====
Focuses on francophone areas of New Brunswick, where Acadian identity can be acquired through voluntary participation in a French-speaking community, regardless of ancestry. The Acadian flag is often displayed alone as a political statement. It represents a project for official recognition, potentially as a new province or through enhanced autonomy.

=== Additional popular conceptions (Trépanier) ===
Trépanier’s interviews revealed further nuances:

- “Felt and lived” Acadia – defined by lifestyle and emotional attachment rather than geography or history.
- “Disconcerting” Acadia – the difficulty or refusal of many Acadians to locate Acadia precisely.
- “Folklore” Acadia – a tourist-oriented, nostalgic vision (supported by only 4% of respondents), epitomized by sites such as the Village Historique Acadian.

== Cartography of Acadia ==
=== Pre-1763 ===
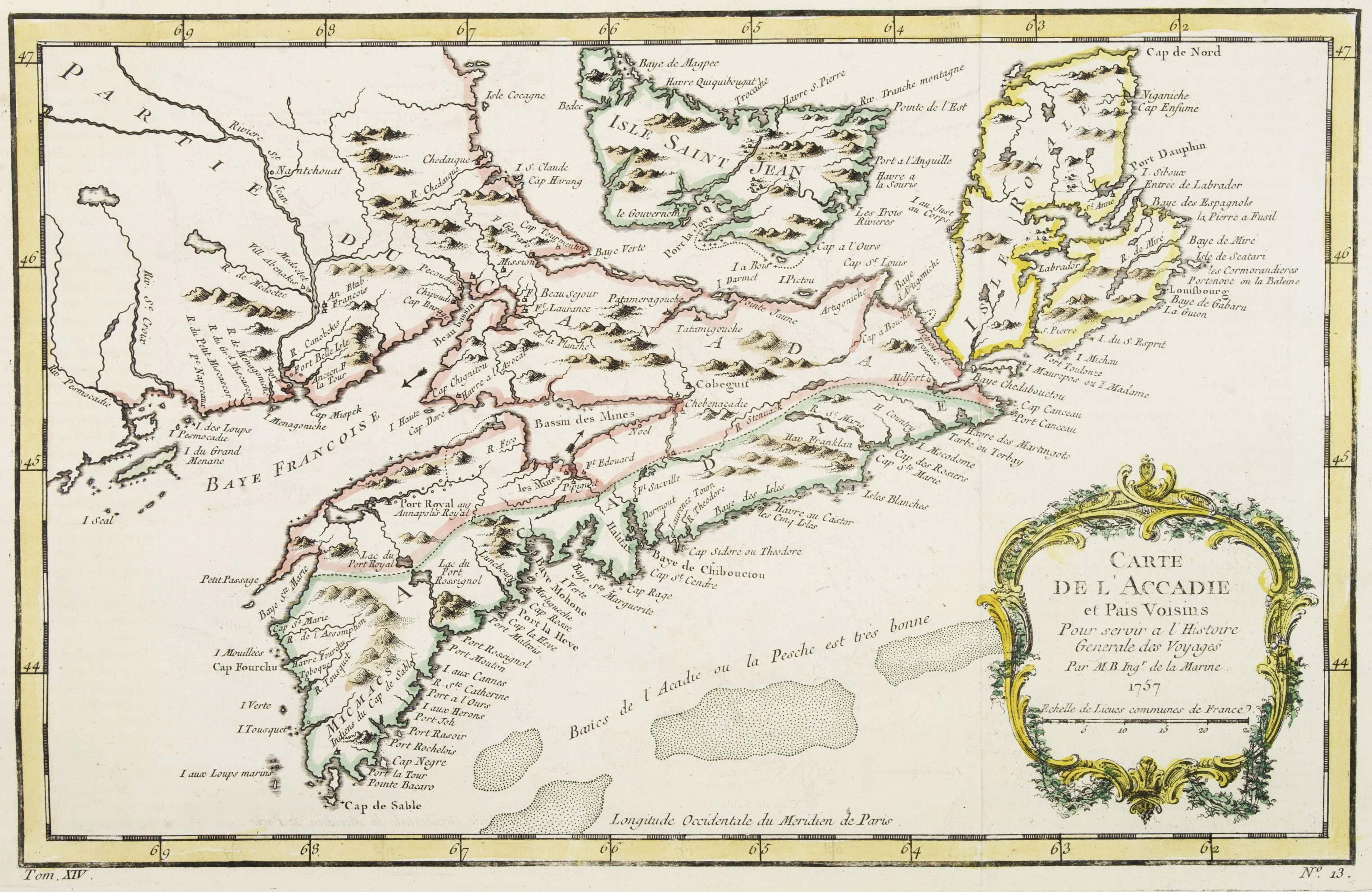
Bellin’s 1757 map of Acadia and neighboring regions

Historical boundaries of Acadia were contested between France and Britain long before 1763, with no universally accepted limits.

=== Post-1763 ===
The absence of an official map is sometimes cited as proof that Acadia does not exist, yet numerous maps have been produced, especially during the identity debates of the 1980s.

Bérubé identified four cartographic approaches:

- Historical (e.g., Alan Rayburn) – attempting to reconstruct pre-conquest boundaries.
- Post-Deportation settlement patterns (e.g., R.A. Leblanc).
- Mental maps collected from residents (e.g., C. Williams).
- Statistical mapping using linguistic census data (Bérubé’s own method).

Many maps are either over-inclusive or under-inclusive because of assimilation, varying local identities, and lack of official status.

== Official recognition ==
Officially recognized Acadiana region in Louisiana

Louisiana’s 22-parish Acadiana region was officially designated in 1971. Newfoundland and Labrador’s francophone community gained provincial recognition in 1992.

In Canada, section 16.1 of the Canadian Charter of Rights and Freedoms (1993) acknowledges New Brunswick’s French linguistic community without delimiting territory. Prime Minister Stephen Harper recognized Acadia’s existence but declined to grant it “nation” status comparable to Quebec (2006).

== Future of Acadian boundaries ==
Possible scenarios include maintaining the status quo, progressive duality within existing provinces, creation of an Acadian province, or union/annexation with Quebec. Support for annexation or independence has historically been low (25% in 1964, 7% at the 1979 convention). Maritime union is occasionally proposed but generally seen as benefiting anglophones more than Acadians.

== See also ==
- Acadia
- History of Acadia
- Expulsion of the Acadians
- Acadian Renaissance
- Quebec nationalism
- Cajuns
- Acadiana
- Maritime Union
- Antigonish Movement
- Société Nationale de l'Acadia
- Flag of Acadia
- French language in Canada
- Territorial evolution of Canada

== Bibliography ==
- Bérubé, Adrien (1987). "De l'Acadie historique à la Nouvelle-Acadie: les grandes perceptions contemporaines de l'Acadie" [From Historic Acadia to New Acadia: Contemporary Perceptions of Acadia]. Les Acadiens: état de la recherche [The Acadians: state of research]. Collection Perspectives (in French). pp. 198–225. ISSN 0382-0262.
- Brasseaux, Carl A. (1987). The Founding of New Acadia: The Beginnings of Acadian Life in Louisiana, 1765–1803. Louisiana State University Press. ISBN 978-0-8071-1296-0.
- Carroll, Francis M. (2001). A Good and Wise Measure: The Search for the Canadian-American Boundary, 1783–1842. University of Toronto Press. ISBN 978-0-8020-8358-6.
- Daigle, Jean (1993). L'Acadie des Maritimes: études thématiques des débuts à nos jours [Acadia in the Maritimes: thematic studies from the early days to the present day] (in French). Centre d’études acadiennes, Université de Moncton. ISBN 2-921166-06-2.
- Ganong, William F. (1901). A Monograph of the Evolution of the Boundaries of the Province of New Brunswick. Royal Society of Canada.
- Griffiths, N.E.S. (2005). From Migrant to Acadian: A North American Border People, 1604–1755. McGill-Queen's University Press. ISBN 978-0-7735-2699-0.
- Guerry, Elsa; Basque, Maurice; Couturier, Jacques Paul (2005). L'Acadie hier et aujourd'hui : l'histoire d'une déportation [Acadia Yesterday and Today: The History of a Deportation] (in French). Moncton: Éditions d'Acadie. ISBN 9780976892748.
- Massicotte, Julien; Pâquet, Martin; Savard, Stéphane (2007). "Le territoire acadien: contextes et perceptions" [Acadian territory: contexts and perceptions]. Balises et références: Acadies, francophonies [Tags and references: Acadias, Francophone communities] (in French). Presses de l’Université Laval. pp. 79–104. ISBN 978-2-7637-8535-6.
- Moore, John Bassett (1898). History and Digest of the International Arbitrations to which the United States Has Been a Party. Vol. 1. Government Printing Office.
- Nicholson, Brendan (1979). The Boundaries of the Canadian Confederation. Macmillan of Canada. ISBN 9780770517427.
- Trépanier, Cécyle (1996). "Le mythe de « l'Acadie des Maritimes »" [The myth of “Acadia in the Maritimes”]. Géographie et cultures (in French) (17).
- Thériault, Joseph-Yvon (1995). Identité et cultures nationales: L'Amérique française en mutation [Identity and national cultures: French America in transition] (in French). Presses de l’Université Laval. ISBN 2-7637-7424-5.
- Van Zandt, Franklin K. (1976). Boundaries of the United States and the Several States. U.S. Geological Survey.
- Dorion, Henri; Lacasse, Jean-Paul (2011). Le Québec: territoire incertain [Québec: uncertain territory]. Les éditions du Septentrion. ISBN 978-2894486610.
