= Tree Island =

Tree Island may refer to:

- Tree Island, South China Sea, Hainan, People's Republic of China
- Tree Island, Queensland, Australia
- Tree Island (British Columbia), an island in the lower Fraser River, British Columbia
- Tree Island is a local name for Sandy Island, the core island of Sandy Island Marine Provincial Park, Canada
- Tree Island (novel), by Linda Grover
- Tree Island, also known as Pak Chau, Tuen Mun District, New Territories, Hong Kong
- Tree island, a variety of tropical hardwood hammock found in the Florida Everglades
