= William Hook =

William Hook (or Hooke) may refer to:

- William Hooke (minister) (1600–1677), an English minister
- William Hooke (governor) (1612–1652), the governor of New Somersetshire in North America
- William Cather Hook (1857–1921), a United States federal judge
- William Hooke (screenwriter), writer of Shark Attack and its sequels

== See also ==
- Bill Hook (disambiguation)
