= Bill Hook =

Bill Hook may refer to:

- Bill Hook (chess player) (1925–2010), British Virgin Islands chess player
- Bill Hook (rugby union) (1920–2013), English rugby union player
- Billhook, cutting tool used in agriculture and forestry

== See also ==
- William Hook (disambiguation)
