= Tree Island (British Columbia) =

Island in British Columbia, Canada

Coordinates: 49.223°N 122.810°W

Tree Island is a small uninhabited island in the Fraser River in Coquitlam, British Columbia. It is located near the mouth of the Coquitlam River, just east of the Port Mann Bridge and west of the much larger Douglas Island.
